= Ichio Station =

Railway station in Takatori, Nara Prefecture, Japan

Ichio Station 市尾駅
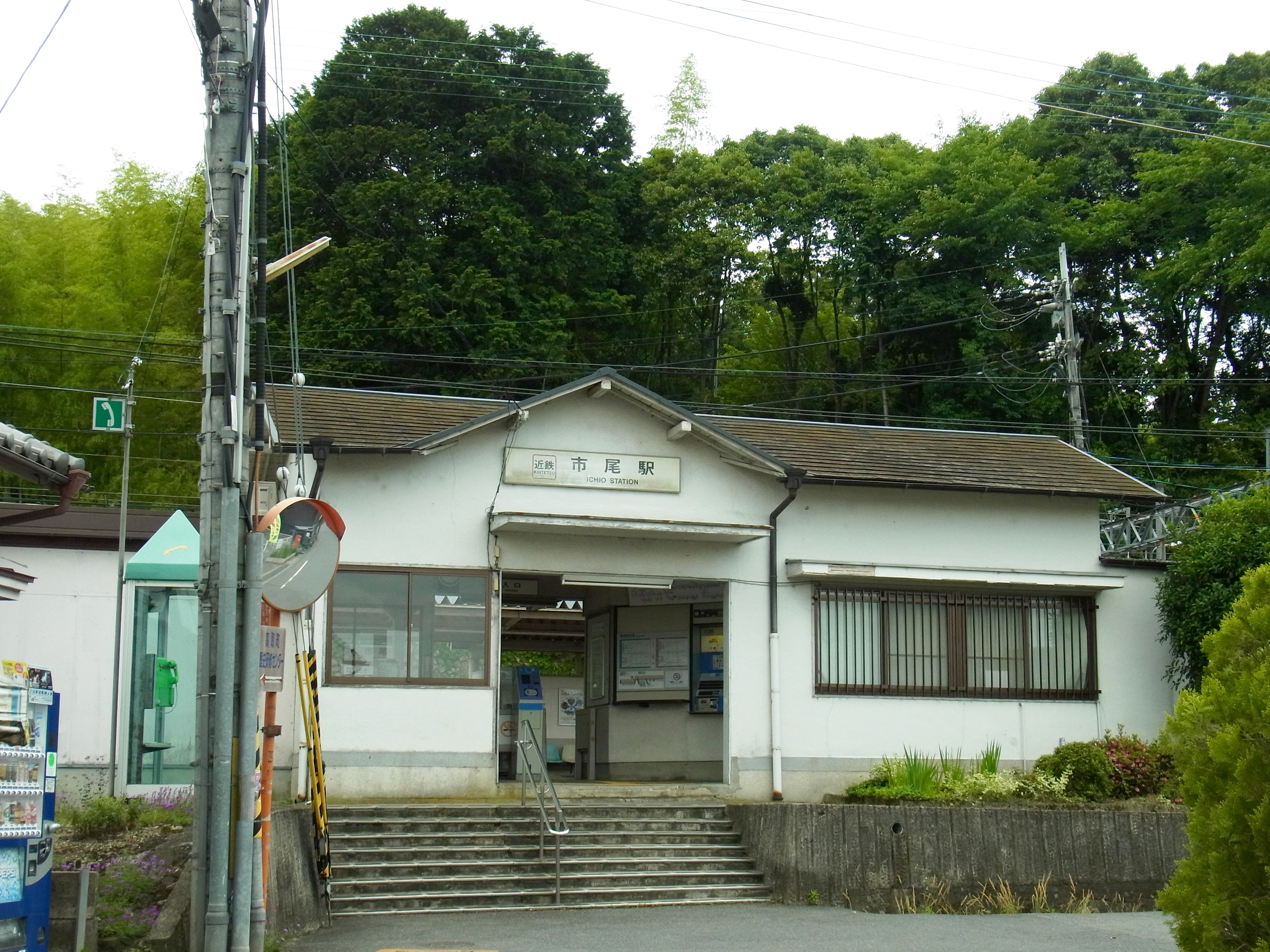
- Ichio station building

General information
- Location: 784, Ichio, Takatori-cho, Takaichi-gun Nara-ken 635-0123; Japan
- Coordinates: 34°26′30″N 135°46′34″E
- System: Kintetsu Railway commuter rail station
- Owner: Kintetsu Railway
- Operator: Kintetsu Railway
- Line: F Yoshino Line
- Distance: 6.0 km (3.7 miles)
- Platforms: 2 side platforms
- Tracks: 2
- Train operators: Kintetsu Railway
- Connections: None

Construction
- Structure type: At grade
- Parking: None
- Cycle facilities: Available
- Accessible: Yes (1 accessible slope for each platforms and 2 slopes between the ticket gate and the southbound platform)

Other information
- Station code: F46
- Website: www.kintetsu.co.jp/station/station_info/en_station08009.html

History
- Opened: 5 December 1923

Passengers
- 2019: 266
Services
Preceding station	Kintetsu Railway	Following station
F Yoshino Line
Tsubosakayama towards Ōsaka-Abenobashi, Furuichi or Kashiharajingū-mae	Local	Kuzu towards Yoshino, Muda or Yoshinoguchi
Tsubosakayama towards Ōsaka-Abenobashi	Semi-express	Kuzu towards Yoshino
Tsubosakayama towards Ōsaka-Abenobashi	Express	Kuzu towards Yoshino
Location
- Location within Nara Prefecture Location within Japan

Ichio Station (市尾駅, Ichio-eki) is a passenger railway station located in the town of Takatori, Nara Prefecture, Japan. It is operated by the private transportation company, Kintetsu Railway.

== Line ==
Ichio Station is served by the Yoshino Line and is 6.0 kilometers from the starting point of the line at Kashiharajingū-mae and 45.7 kilometers from Ōsaka Abenobashi.

== Layout ==
The station is a ground-level station with two opposing side platforms and two tracks where trains can pass each other, with a platform length of four cars. The station building is on the Yoshino side of the up-bound platform, and is connected to the down-bound platform by a level crossing within the premises. The station is unattended.

=== Platforms ===
1	■ F Yoshino Line	for Yoshino
2	■ F Yoshino Line	for Kashihara-Jingumae, Furuichi and Osaka Abenobashi

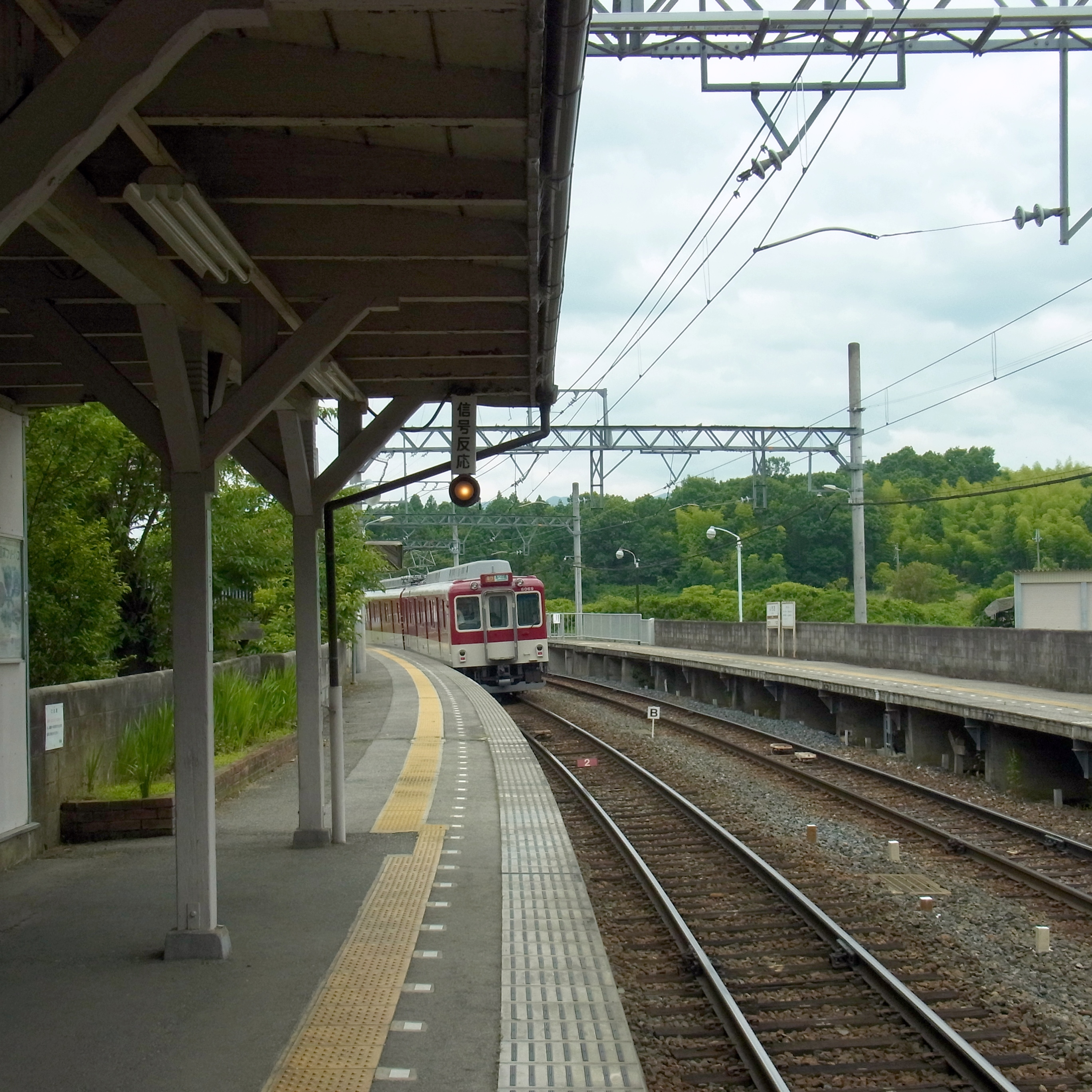
Platform

== History ==
Ichio Station opened on 5 December 1923 on the Yoshino Railway. On 1 August 1929, the Osaka Electric Tramway merged with Yoshino Railway, and the station became part of the Osaka Electric Tramway Yoshino Line. On 15 March 1941, the line merged with the Sangu Express Railway and became the Kansai Express Railway's Osaka Line. This line was merged with the Nankai Electric Railway on 1 June 1944 to form Kintetsu.

== Passenger statistics ==
In fiscal 2019, the station was used by an average of 266 passengers daily (boarding passengers only).

== Surrounding area ==
- Hakayama Kofun

== See also ==
- List of railway stations in Japan
