= Kusurimizu Station =

Railway station in Ōyodo, Nara Prefecture, Japan

Kusurimizu Station 薬水駅
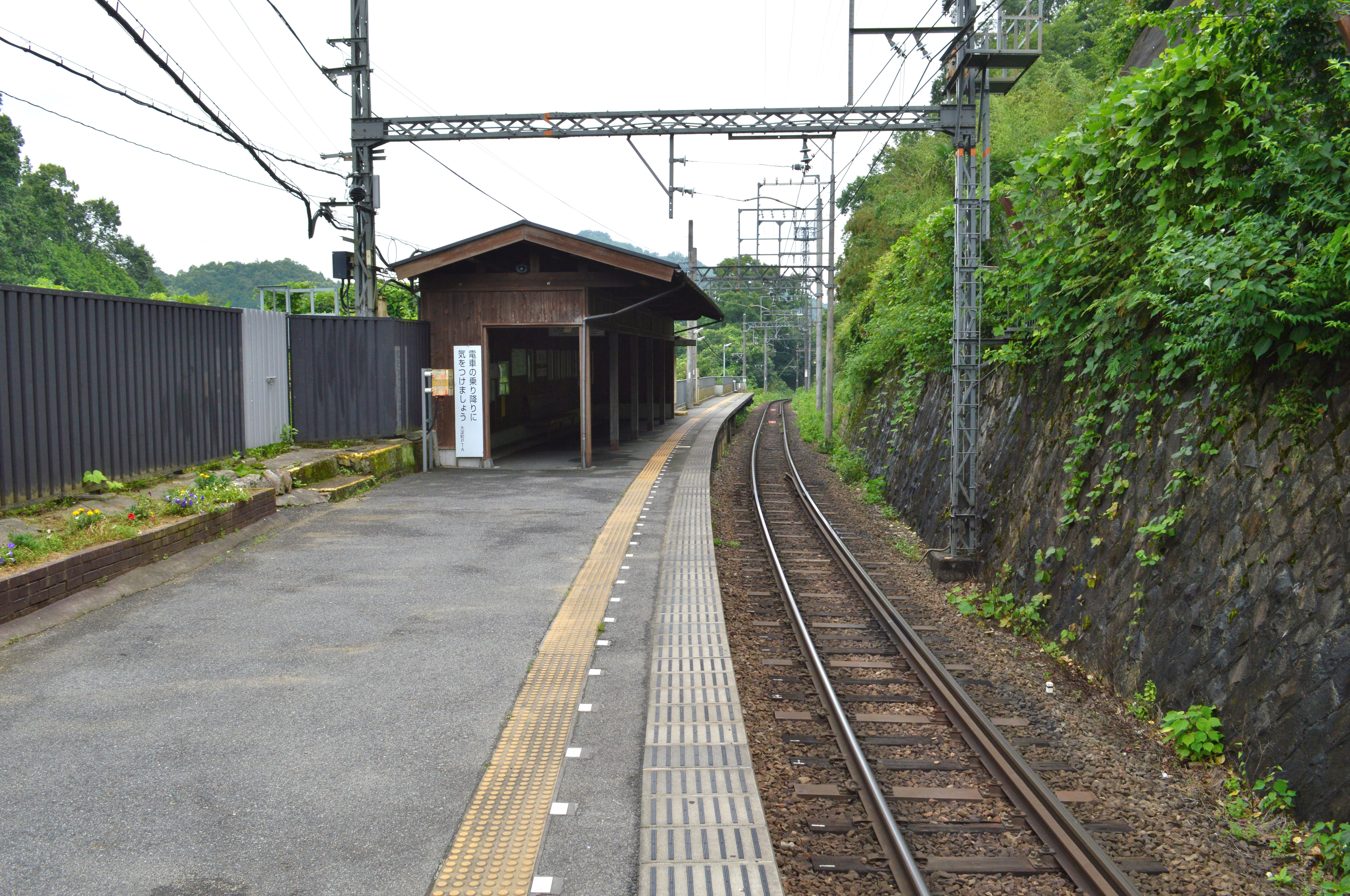
- The platform of Kusurimizu Station

General information
- Location: 1085, Kusurimizu, Ōyodo-cho, Yoshino-gun, Nara-ken 638-0832; Japan
- Coordinates: 34°24′27″N 135°44′35″E
- System: Kintetsu Railway commuter rail station
- Owner: Kintetsu Railway
- Operator: Kintetsu Railway
- Line: F Yoshino Line
- Distance: 11.2 km (7.0 miles)
- Platforms: 1 side platform
- Tracks: 1
- Train operators: Kintetsu Railway
- Connections: None

Construction
- Structure type: At grade
- Parking: None
- Cycle facilities: Available
- Accessible: No

Other information
- Station code: F49
- Website: www.kintetsu.co.jp/station/station_info/en_station08012.html

History
- Opened: 7 February 1924

Passengers
- 2019: 72
Services
Preceding station	Kintetsu Railway	Following station
F Yoshino Line
Yoshinoguchi towards Ōsaka-Abenobashi, Furuichi or Kashiharajingū-mae	Local	Fukugami towards Yoshino or Muda
Yoshinoguchi towards Ōsaka-Abenobashi	Semi-express	Fukugami towards Yoshino
Yoshinoguchi towards Ōsaka-Abenobashi	Express	Fukugami towards Yoshino
Location
- Location within Nara Prefecture Location within Japan

Kusurimizu Station (薬水駅, Kusurimizu-eki) is a passenger railway station located in the town of Ōyodo, Yoshino District, Nara Prefecture, Japan. It is operated by the private transportation company, Kintetsu Railway.

== Line ==
Kusurimizu Station is served by the Yoshino Line and is 11.2 kilometers from the starting point of the line at Kashiharajingū-mae and 50.9 kilometers from Ōsaka Abenobashi.

== Layout ==
The station consists of one track and one side platform, with the platform on the right side facing Yoshino. It is on a slope and is connected to ground level by stairs. There is no station building, so passengers enter the platform directly from the stairs. The effective length of the platform is for four cars.

== History ==
The station opened on 7 February 1924 on the Yoshino Railway. The Yoshino Railway merged with the Osaka Electric Tramway on 1 August 1929, which in turn merged with the Sangu Express Railway on 15 March 1941 to form the Kansai Express Railway. The Kansai Express Rail merged with Nankai Railway on 1 June 1944 to form the Kintetsu Railway Yoshino Line

== Passenger statistics ==
In fiscal 2019, the station was used by an average of 72 passengers daily (boarding passengers only).

== Surrounding area ==
The station is located near the Yakusui Daishi temple, from which the station takes its name.

== See also ==
- List of railway stations in Japan
