= Kuzu Station =

Railway station in Gose, Nara Prefecture, Japan

Kuzu Station 葛駅
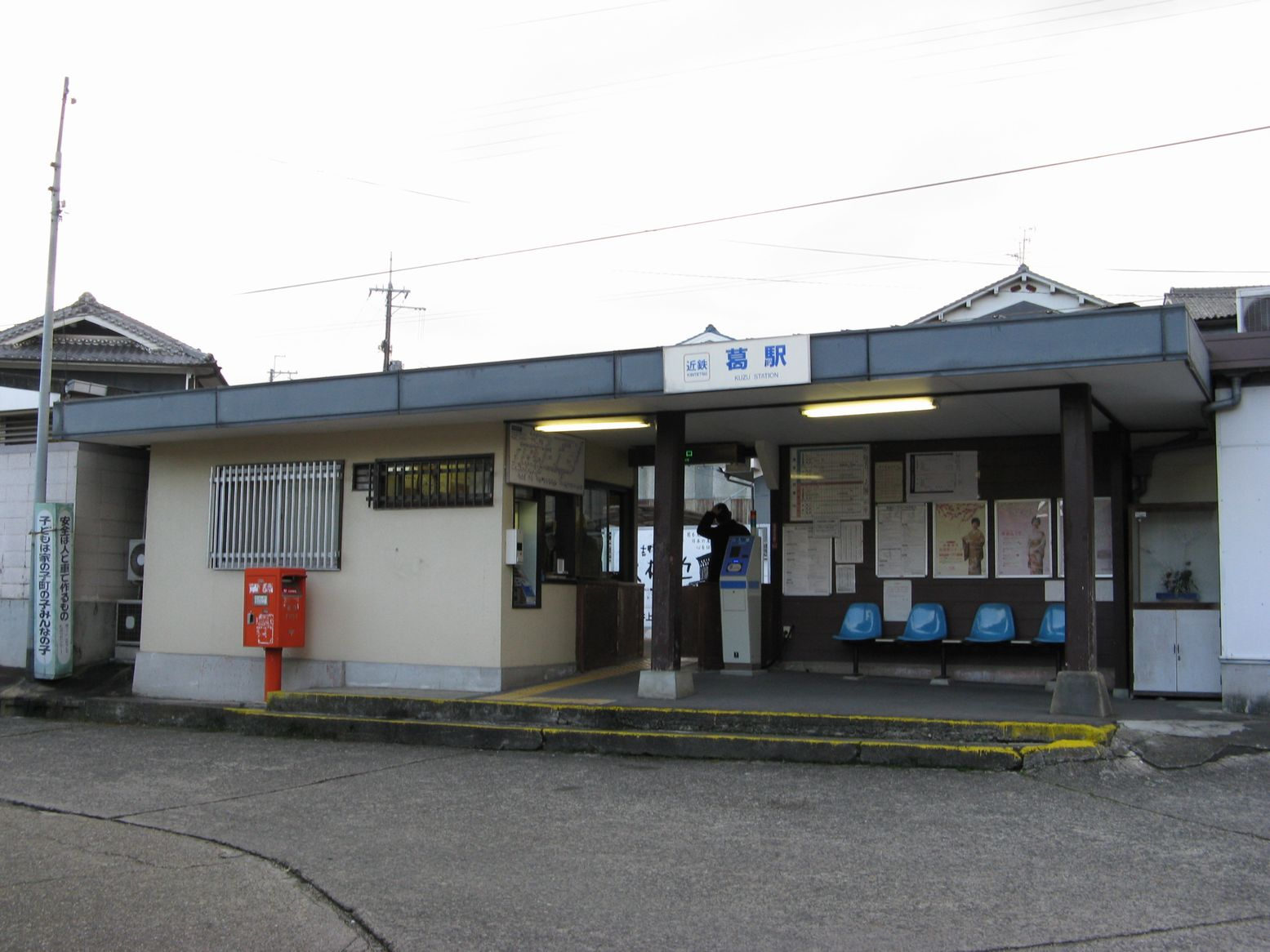
- Kuzu Station in December 2006

General information
- Location: 981–3, Toge, Gose-shi, Nara-ken 639-2251; Japan
- Coordinates: 34°25′53″N 135°45′36″E
- System: Kintetsu Railway commuter rail station
- Owner: Kintetsu Railway
- Operator: Kintetsu Railway
- Line: F Yoshino Line
- Distance: 7.9 km (4.9 miles) from Kashiharajingū-mae
- Platforms: 1 side platform
- Tracks: 1
- Train operators: Kintetsu Railway
- Connections: Gose City Community Bus: Himawari-gō East Course at Kuzu-kōminkan-mae

Construction
- Structure type: At grade
- Parking: None
- Cycle facilities: Available
- Accessible: Yes

Other information
- Station code: F47
- Website: www.kintetsu.co.jp/station/station_info/en_station08010.html

History
- Opened: 5 December 1923

Passengers
- 2019: 199
Services
Preceding station	Kintetsu Railway	Following station
F Yoshino Line
Ichio towards Ōsaka-Abenobashi, Furuichi or Kashiharajingū-mae	Local	Yoshinoguchi towards Yoshino or Muda
Ichio towards Ōsaka-Abenobashi, Furuichi or Kashiharajingū-mae	Local	Yoshinoguchi Terminus
Ichio towards Ōsaka-Abenobashi	Semi-express	Yoshinoguchi towards Yoshino
Ichio towards Ōsaka-Abenobashi	Express	Yoshinoguchi towards Yoshino
Location

Kuzu Station (葛駅, Kuzu-eki) is a passenger railway station located in the city of Gose, Nara Prefecture, Japan. It is operated by the private transportation company, Kintetsu Railway.

== Line ==
Kuzu Station is served by the Yoshino Line and is 7.9 kilometers from the starting point of the line at Kashiharajingū-mae and 47.6 kilometers from Osaka Abenobashi.

== Layout ==
The station is a ground-level station with one side platform and one track, and trains bound for both Yoshino and Osaka-Abenobashi depart and arrive from the same platform. The effective length of the platform is for four cars. The station building is located on the Kashihara side of the platform. The station is unattended.

== History ==
Kuzu Station was opened 5 December 1923 on the Yoshino Railway. In 1929, the Yoshino Railway merged with the Osaka Electric Tramway, which in turn merged with the Sangu Express Railway in 1941. Through a subsequent merger it became a station on the Kintetsu Railway on 1 June 1944.

== Passenger statistics ==
In fiscal 2019 the station was used by an average of 199 passengers daily (boarding passengers only).

== Connections ==
- Gose City Community Bus

for Kintetsu Gose Station, and Kazenomori Tōge

== Surrounding area ==
- Japan National Route 309
- Gose City Kuzu Elementary and Junior High School

== See also ==
- List of railway stations in Japan
