= Asuka Station =

Railway station in Asuka, Nara Prefecture, Japan

Asuka Station 飛鳥駅
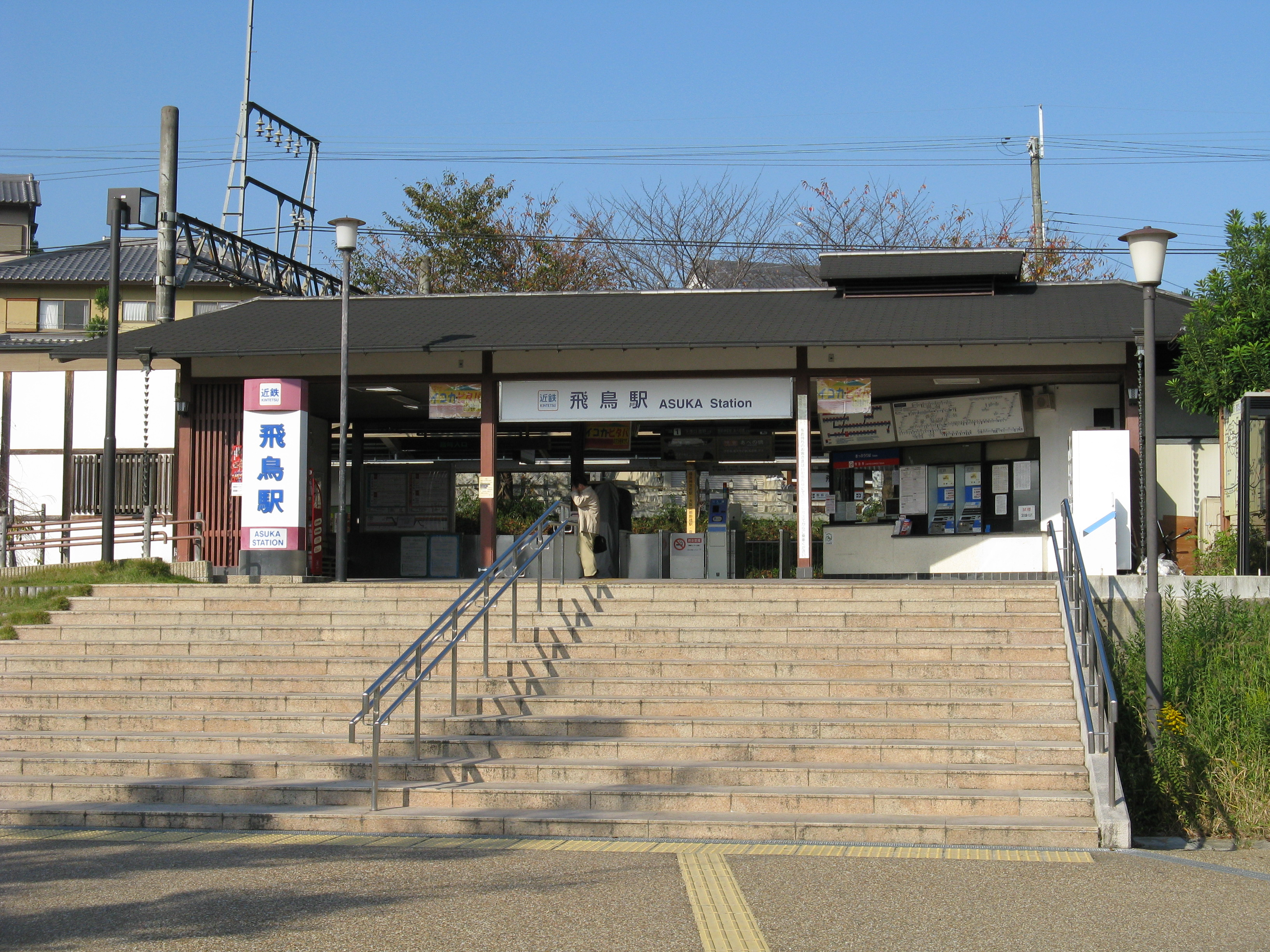
- Asuka Station

General information
- Location: 560, Koshi, Asuka; Nara: Japan; （奈良県高市郡明日香村越560）
- Coordinates: 34°27′53″N 135°47′53″E
- System: Kintetsu Railway commuter rail station
- Owner: Kintetsu Railway
- Operator: Kintetsu Railway
- Line: F Yoshino Line
- Distance: 2.2 km (1.4 miles)
- Platforms: 2 side platforms
- Tracks: 2
- Train operators: Kintetsu Railway
- Bus stands: 1
- Connections: Nara Kotsu Bus Lines: 15・16 Aka-kame (Asuka Excursion Bus)・51・52

Construction
- Structure type: At grade
- Parking: Available
- Cycle facilities: Available
- Accessible: Yes (1 accessible slope for the ticket gate and 1 elevator for the northbound platform)

Other information
- Station code: F44
- Website: www.kintetsu.co.jp/station/station_info/en_station08007.html

History
- Opened: 31 March 1929
- Former names: Tachibanadera (1929—1970)

Passengers
- 2015: 2,363
Services
Preceding station	Kintetsu Railway	Following station
F Yoshino Line
Okadera towards Ōsaka-Abenobashi, Furuichi or Kashiharajingū-mae	Local	Tsubosakayama towards Yoshino, Muda or Yoshinoguchi
Okadera towards Ōsaka-Abenobashi, Furuichi or Kashiharajingū-mae	Local	Tsubosakayama Terminus
Okadera towards Ōsaka-Abenobashi	Semi-express	Tsubosakayama towards Yoshino
Okadera towards Ōsaka-Abenobashi	Express	Tsubosakayama towards Yoshino
Kashiharajingū-mae towards Ōsaka-Abenobashi	Limited Express	Tsubosakayama towards Yoshino
Kashiharajingū-mae towards Ōsaka-Abenobashi	Sakura Liner	Tsubosakayama towards Yoshino
Location

Asuka Station (飛鳥駅, Asuka-eki) is a railway station located in Asuka, Takaichi, Nara, Japan, on the Kintetsu Railway Yoshino Line.

== Lines ==
- Kintetsu Railway
  - F Yoshino Line

== Platforms and tracks ==
1	■ Yoshino Line	for Yoshino

2	■ Yoshino Line	for Kashihara-Jingumae, Furuichi and Osaka Abenobashi

== Surroundings ==
- National Route 169
- Takamatsuzuka Tomb
- Ishibutai Kofun
- Oni no Manaita, Oni no Setchin
- Tomb of Emperor Tenmu and Empress Jitō
- Tomb of Emperor Kinmei
