= Tsubosakayama Station =

Railway station in Takatori, Nara Prefecture, Japan

Tsubosakayama Station 壷阪山駅
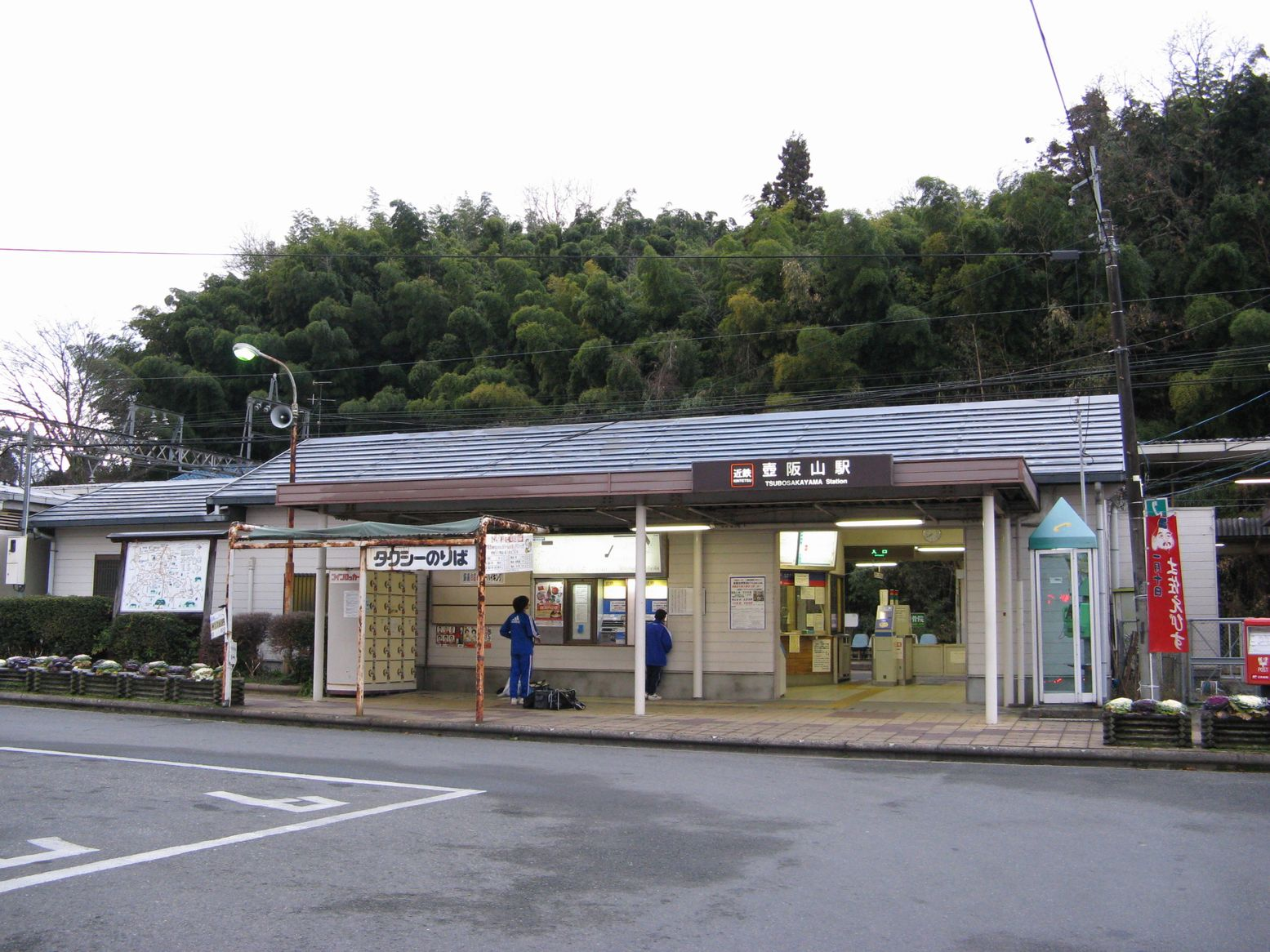
- Tsubosakayama Station

General information
- Location: 886, Kangakuji, Takatori-cho, Takaichi-gun, Nara-ken 635-0154; Japan
- Coordinates: 34°26′59″N 135°47′42″E
- System: Kintetsu Railway commuter rail station
- Owner: Kintetsu Railway
- Operator: Kintetsu Railway
- Line: F Yoshino Line
- Distance: 3.9 km (2.4 miles) from Kashiharajingū-mae
- Platforms: 1 side + 1 island platform
- Tracks: 3
- Train operators: Kintetsu Railway
- Bus stands: 1
- Connections: Nara Kotsu Bus Lines: 20・51・52

Construction
- Structure type: At grade
- Parking: None
- Cycle facilities: Available
- Accessible: Yes (2 accessible slopes between the ticket gate and the northbound platform)

Other information
- Station code: F45
- Website: www.kintetsu.co.jp/station/station_info/en_station08008.html

History
- Opened: 5 December 1923

Passengers
- 2019: 655
Services
Preceding station	Kintetsu Railway	Following station
F Yoshino Line
Asuka towards Ōsaka-Abenobashi, Furuichi or Kashiharajingū-mae	Local	Ichio towards Yoshino, Muda or Yoshinoguchi
Asuka towards Ōsaka-Abenobashi, Furuichi or Kashiharajingū-mae	Local	Terminus
Asuka towards Ōsaka-Abenobashi	Semi-express	Ichio towards Yoshino
Asuka towards Ōsaka-Abenobashi	Express	Ichio towards Yoshino
Asuka towards Ōsaka-Abenobashi	Limited Express	Yoshinoguchi towards Yoshino
Asuka towards Ōsaka-Abenobashi	Sakura Liner	Yoshinoguchi towards Yoshino
Location
- Location within Nara Prefecture Location within Japan

Tsubosakayama Station (壺阪山駅, Tsubosakayama-eki) is a passenger railway station located in the town of Takatori, Nara Prefecture, Japan. It is operated by the private transportation company, Kintetsu Railway.

== Line ==
Tsubosakayama Station is served by the Yoshino Line and is 3.9 kilometers from the starting point of the line at Kashiharajingū-mae and 43.6 kilometers from Ōsaka Abenobashi.

== Layout ==
The station is a ground-level station with a side platform and an island platform, with three tracks, allowing trains to pass each other and turn around. The effective length of the platforms is enough for four cars. The upbound platform (tracks 2 and 3) is an island platform, and track 3 is a dead end toward Yoshino, and is used for return trains bound for Kashihara-Jingumae. Only the remaining two tracks lead to Yoshino. The station building is on the east side, and is connected to the island platform by a level crossing. The station is unattended.

=== Platforms ===
1	■ F Yoshino Line	for Yoshino
2	■ F Yoshino Line	for Kashihara-Jingumae, Furuichi and Osaka Abenobashi
3	■ F Yoshino Line	for Kashihara-Jingumae

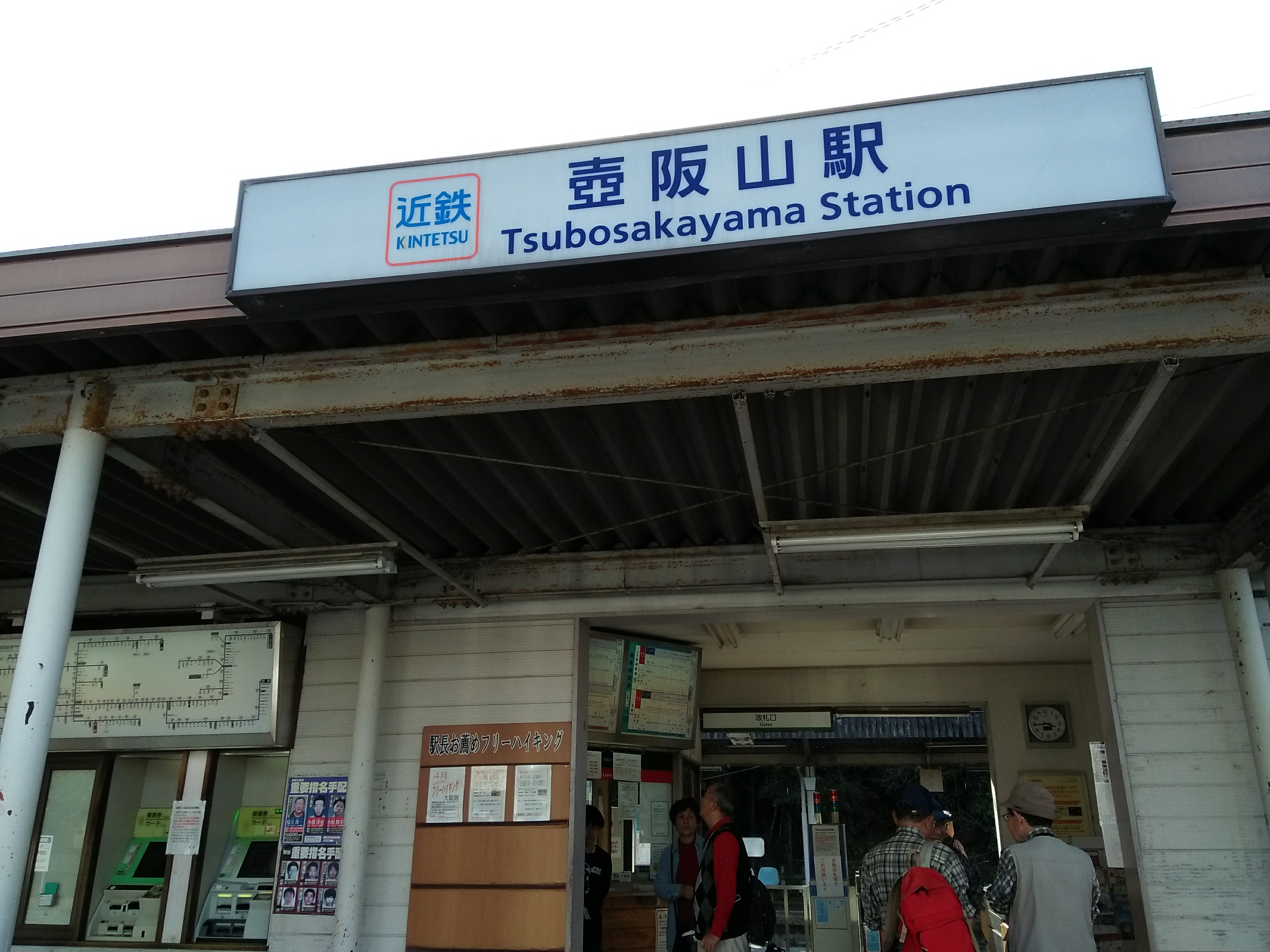
Entrance

== History ==
Tsubosakayama Station opened on 5 December 1923 on the Yoshino Railway. On 1 August 1929, the Osaka Electric Tramway merged with Yoshino Railway, and the station became part of the Osaka Electric Tramway Yoshino Line. On 15 March 1941, the line merged with the Sangu Express Railway and became the Kansai Express Railway's Osaka Line. This line was merged with the Nankai Electric Railway on 1 June 1944 to form Kintetsu.

== Passenger statistics ==
In fiscal 2019, the station was used by an average of 655 passengers daily (boarding passengers only).

== Surrounding area ==
- National Route 169
- Tsubosaka-dera
- Kojima-dera
- Ruin of Takatori Castle (one of the 100 Fine Castles of Japan)
- Takatori Town Office
- Takatori Post Office

== See also ==
- List of railway stations in Japan
