= Midoro Kofun =

Kofun period keyhole-shaped burial mound in Japan

- 水泥古墳 (Japanese)
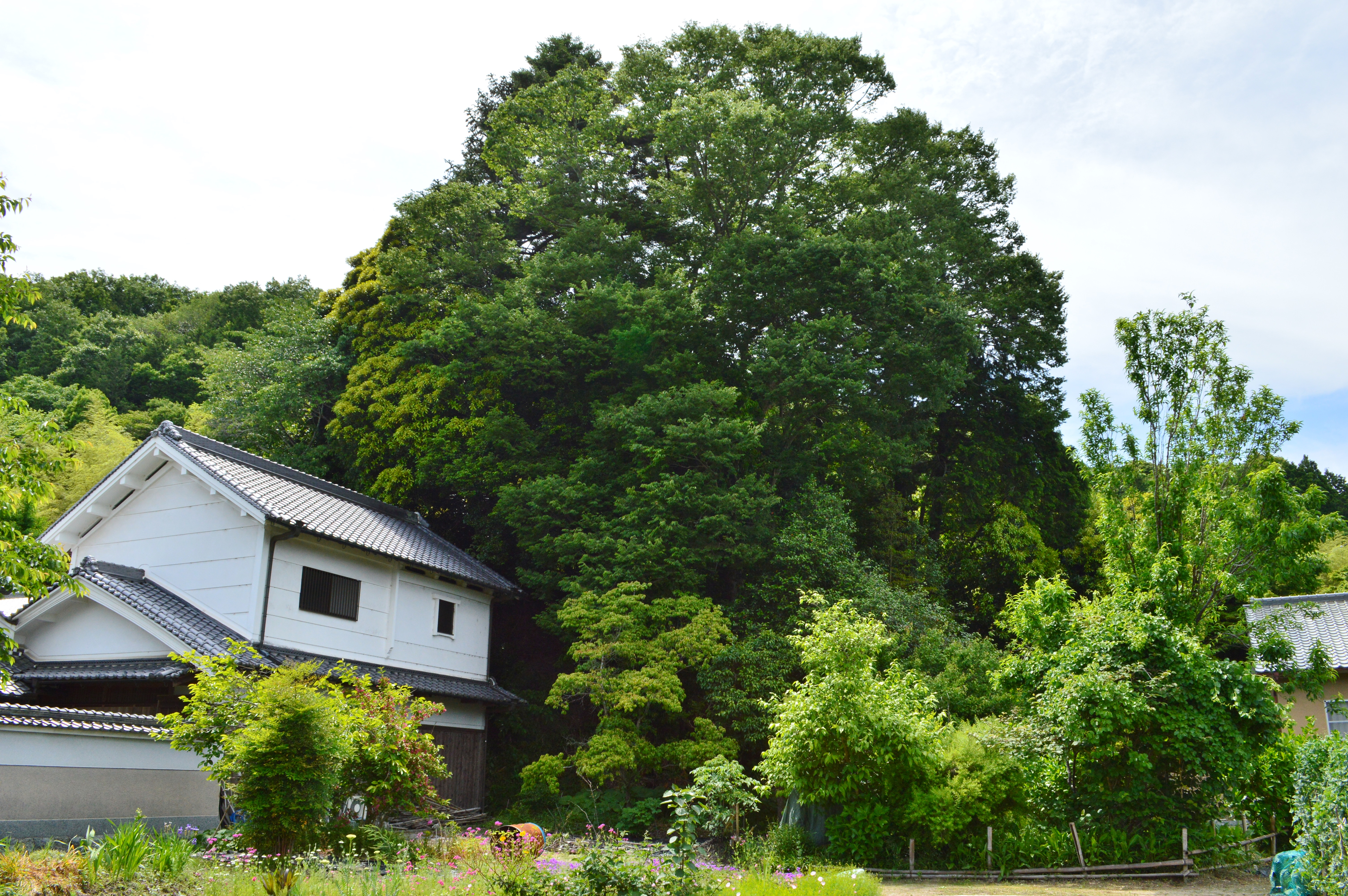
- Midoro Kita Kofun

- Midoro Kofun Midoro Kofun (Japan)
- Interactive map of Midoro Kofun
- 34°24′42.45″N 135°44′33.5″E
- Type: Kofun
- Periods: Kofun period
- Location: Gose, Nara, Japan
- Region: Kansai region

History
- Built: c.5th century

Site notes
- Public access: Yes (no facilities)

Midoro Kofun (水泥古墳) is a pair of Kofun period burial mounds, located in the Furuse neighborhood of the city of Gose, Nara in the Kansai region of Japan. The pair of tumuli were designated a National Historic Site of Japan in 1961. The tumulus is also called the Imaki-no-sō haka (今木の双墓).

== Overview ==
Midoro Kofun stand side-by-side, about 60 meters apart, on the eastern foot of the Kose mountain range near the Yoshino River basin in the southwestern edge of the Nara Basin. The Koseyama Tomb Cluster, a large group of tombs, is distributed in the northern hills, but the Midoro Kofun not regarded as part of that cluster. The two tumuli are called the "Kita Kofun" and the "Minami Kofun", respectively, and both enpun (円墳)-style circular mounds, with horizontal-entry stone burial chambers, with the Kita Kofun being slightly larger in size.

The Minami Kofun has a diameter of about 25 meters and a height of about six meters, and is orientated to the south. The burial chamber and the antechamber were built with piled up broken granite stones, the burial chamber is about 4.6 meters long, 2 meters wide and is currently about 2.2 meters high, the antechamber is about 6.2 meters long, 1.5 meters wide and currently about 1.1 meters high, and contains two stone sarcophagi inside. Both are made of tuff; the body is carved out and the lid is roof-shaped with six rope hanging protrusions. One is located in the main burial chamber, and one on the entrance passage. The one in the main burial chamber is missing its lid, possibly due to grave robbery. The one in the entrance passage is notable for having a lotus motif carved into the front and back rope handing protrusions, and is known as one of the few tombs that show the combination of Kofun culture and Buddhist culture. The floor of the burial chamber is covered with round gravel, and there is a drainage ditch under the gravel bed. Grave goods such as gilt bronze earrings and Sue ware pottery have been found.

The Kita Kofun has a diameter of 20 meters and a height of about seven meters, and is also orientated to the south. It consists of a burial chamber and antechamber; the burial chamber is about 5.6 meters long, 2.95 meters wide and 3.4 meters high, the antechamber is about 7.8 meters long, 1.95 meters wide and 1.85 meters high, and is built of huge stones. Approximately 20 clay pipes made of tiles were laid under the floor of the burial chamber as drainage pipes at the time of the burial. The chamber did not contain a stone sarcophagus, but fragments of tuff mount on the floor indicate that such a sarcophagus once existed, and that the tomb had been robbed. It is currently located on private property and cannot be approached.

The construction date is estimated to be from the late 6th century to the end of the late Kofun period (Kita Kofun) and the early 7th century at the end of the Kofun period (Minami Kofun). Although the identity of the deceased is unknown, these are is believed to be the tombs of a powerful chieftains who introduced Buddhism to the area at an early stage, most probably leaders of the Kose clan, an ancient clan that ruled the area. There has long been a theory that this is the tomb of Soga no Emishi and Soga no Iruka er a description that appears in the December entry for the first year of the reign of Empress Kogyoku (642) in the Nihon Shoki; However, archaeological evidence indicates that the tumuli pre-date the deaths of Soga no Emishi and Iruka by at least 20 years.

The site is about a 15-minute walk from Yoshinoguchi Station on the Kintetsu Railway Yoshino Line.

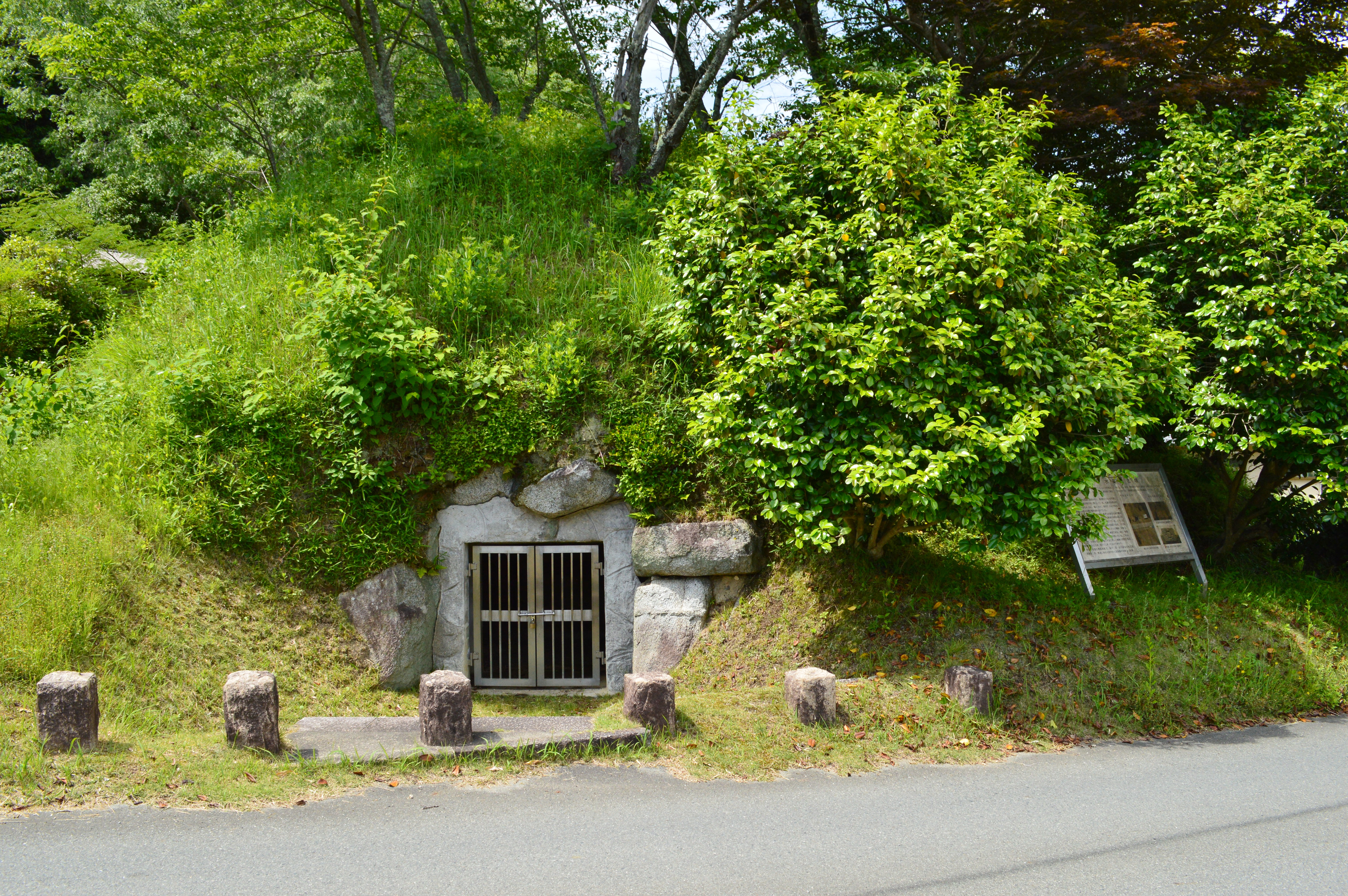
Minami Kofun

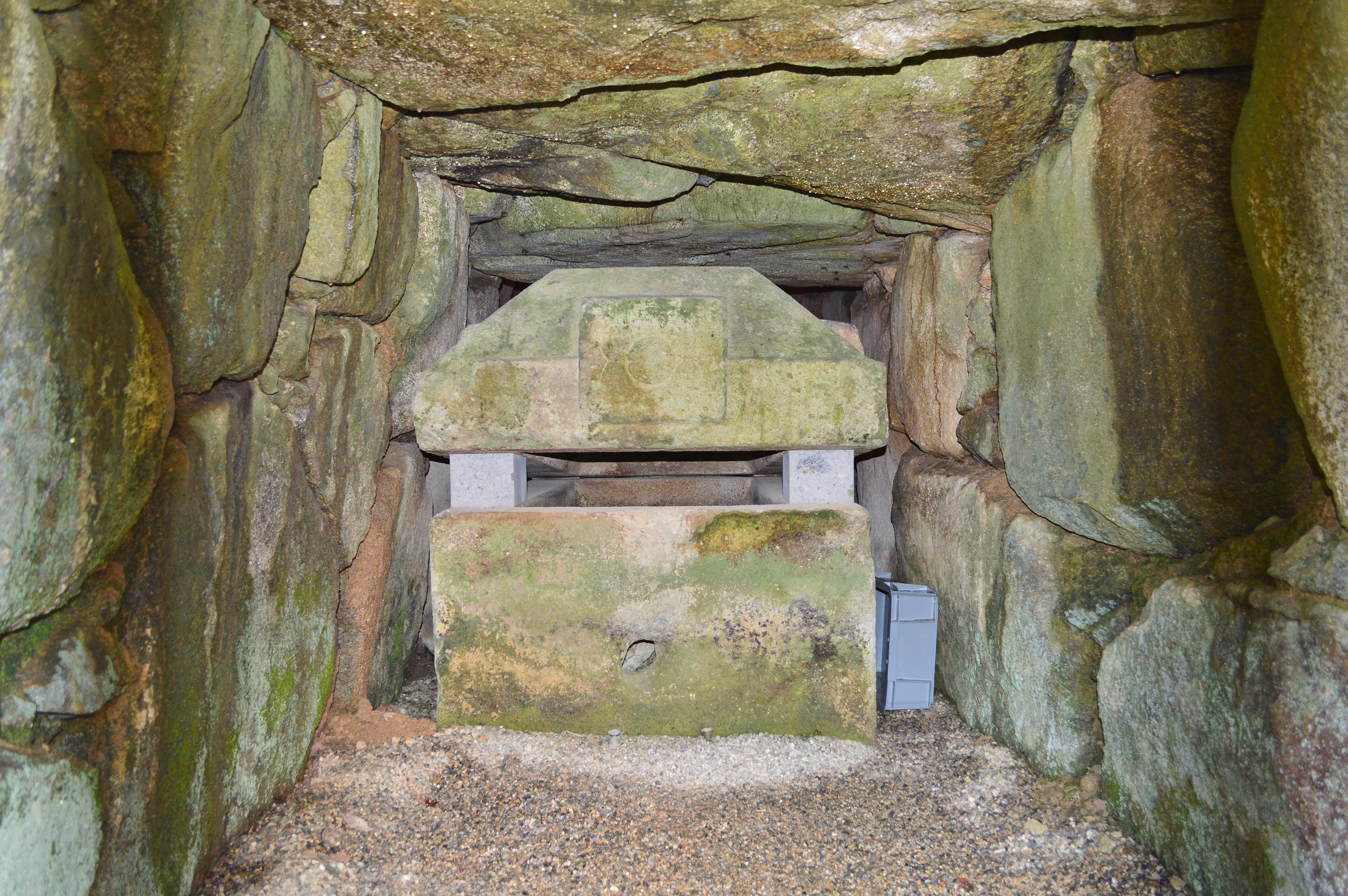
Inside the Minami Kofun

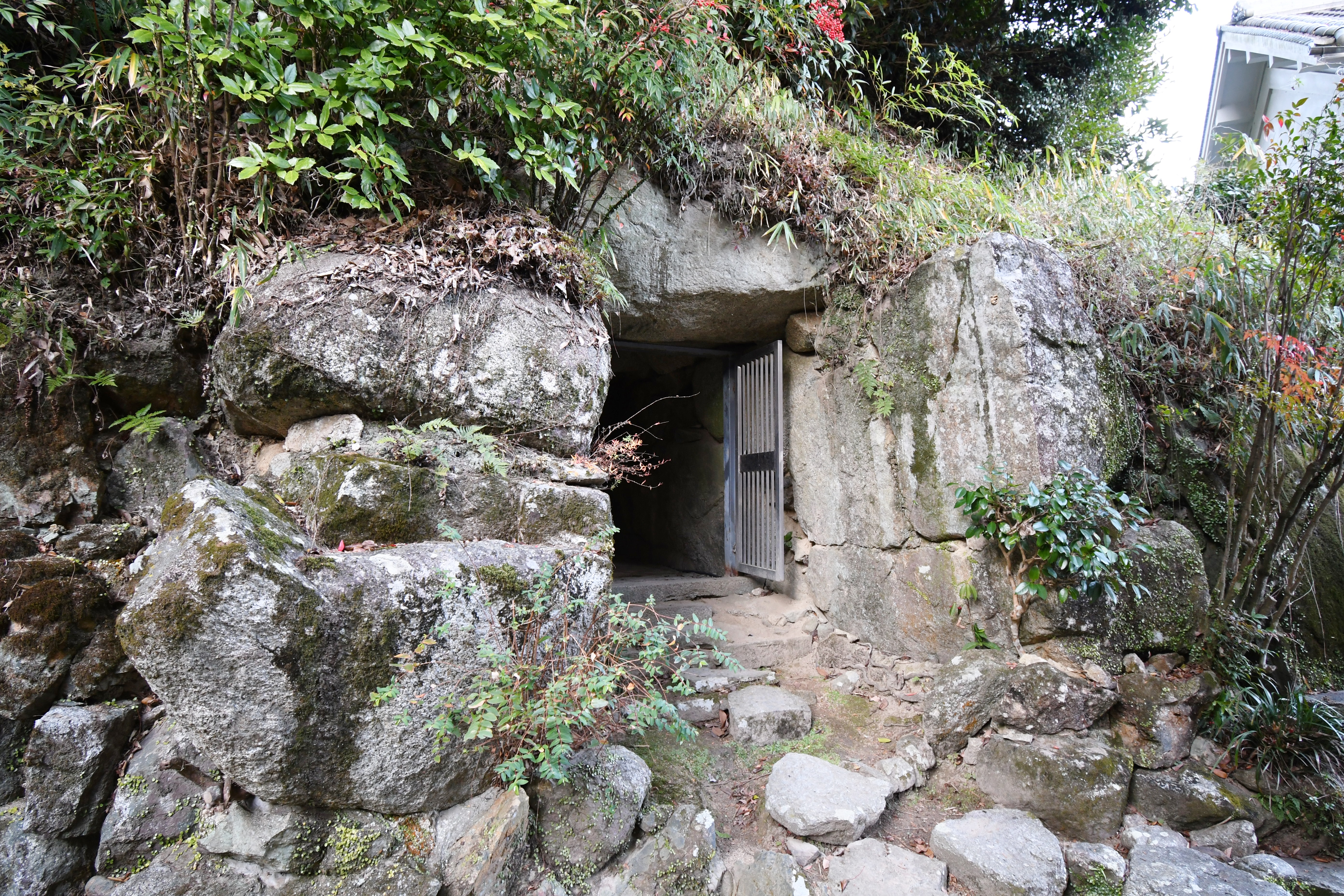
Kita Kofun

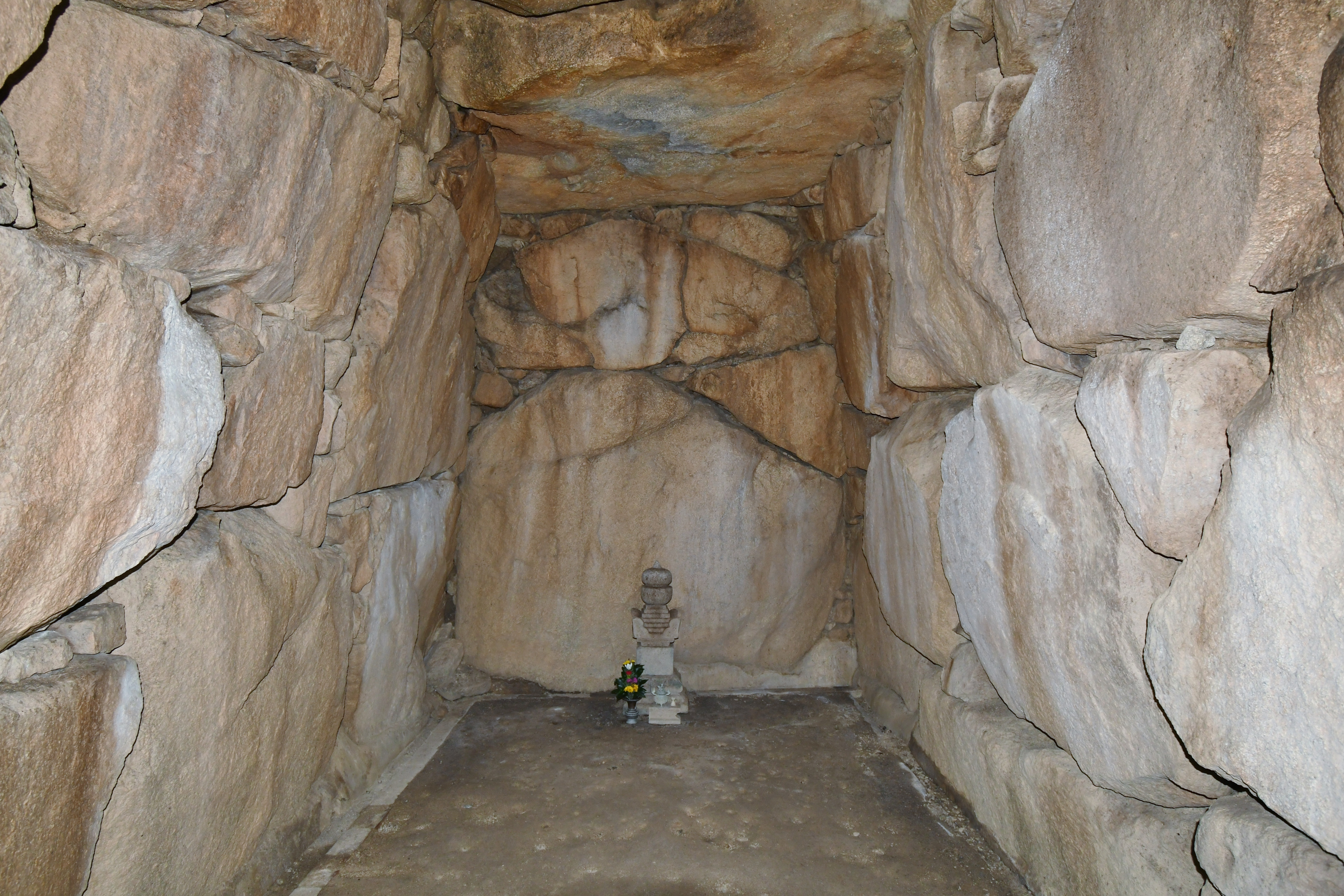
Inside the Kita Kofun

== See also ==
- List of Historic Sites of Japan (Nara)
