= Kashiharajingū-nishiguchi Station =

Railway station in Kashihara, Nara Prefecture, Japan

Kashiharajingū-nishiguchi Station 橿原神宮西口駅
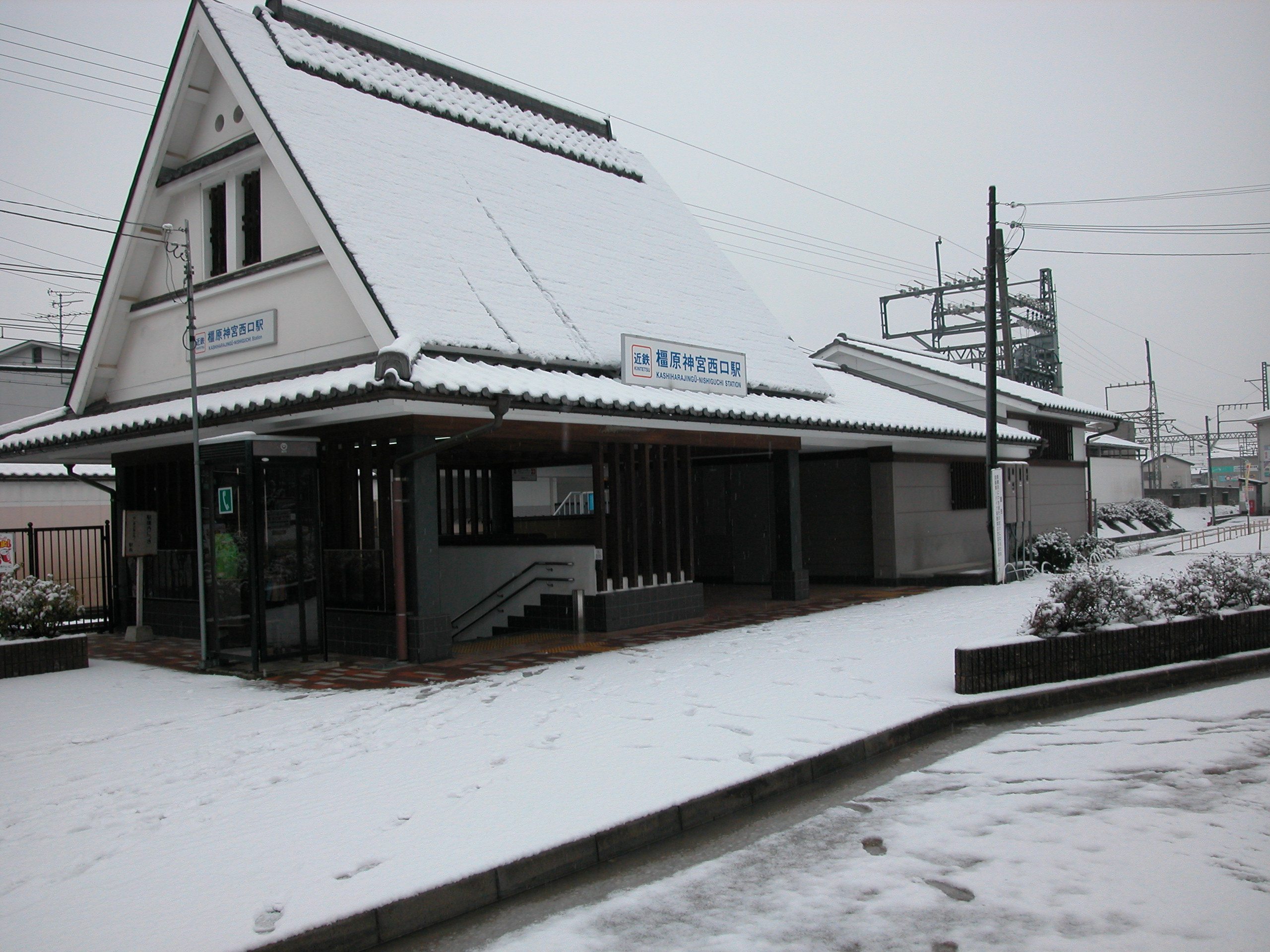
- Station building (Feb. 2008)

General information
- Location: 376-2, Nishiikejiri-chō, Kashihara, Nara （奈良県橿原市西池尻町376-2） Japan
- Coordinates: 34°29′10″N 135°46′55″E
- Operator: Kintetsu Railway
- Line: Minami Osaka Line
- Connections

History
- Opened: 1929; 97 years ago
- Former names: Yamato-ikejiri (until 1940)

Passengers
- 2008: 2,508 daily
Location

Kashiharajingū-nishiguchi Station (橿原神宮西口駅, Kashiharajingū-nishiguchi-eki) is a railway station in Kashihara, Nara Prefecture, Japan.

== Lines ==
- Kintetsu Railway

- Minami Osaka Line

== Layout ==
The station has two side platforms and two tracks

1	■ Minami Osaka Line	for Kashiharajingū-mae and Yoshino
2	■ Minami Osaka Line	for Furuichi, Ōsaka Abenobashi, Gose and Kawachinagano

== Adjacent stations ==
«	Service	»
Minami Osaka Line
Bōjō	Local	Kashiharajingū-mae
Bōjō	Semi-Express	Kashiharajingū-mae
Bōjō	Suburban Express	Kashiharajingū-mae
Express: Does not stop at this station
Limited Express: Does not stop at this station
