= Takadashi Station =

Railway station in Yamatotakada, Nara Prefecture, Japan

Takadashi Station 高田市駅
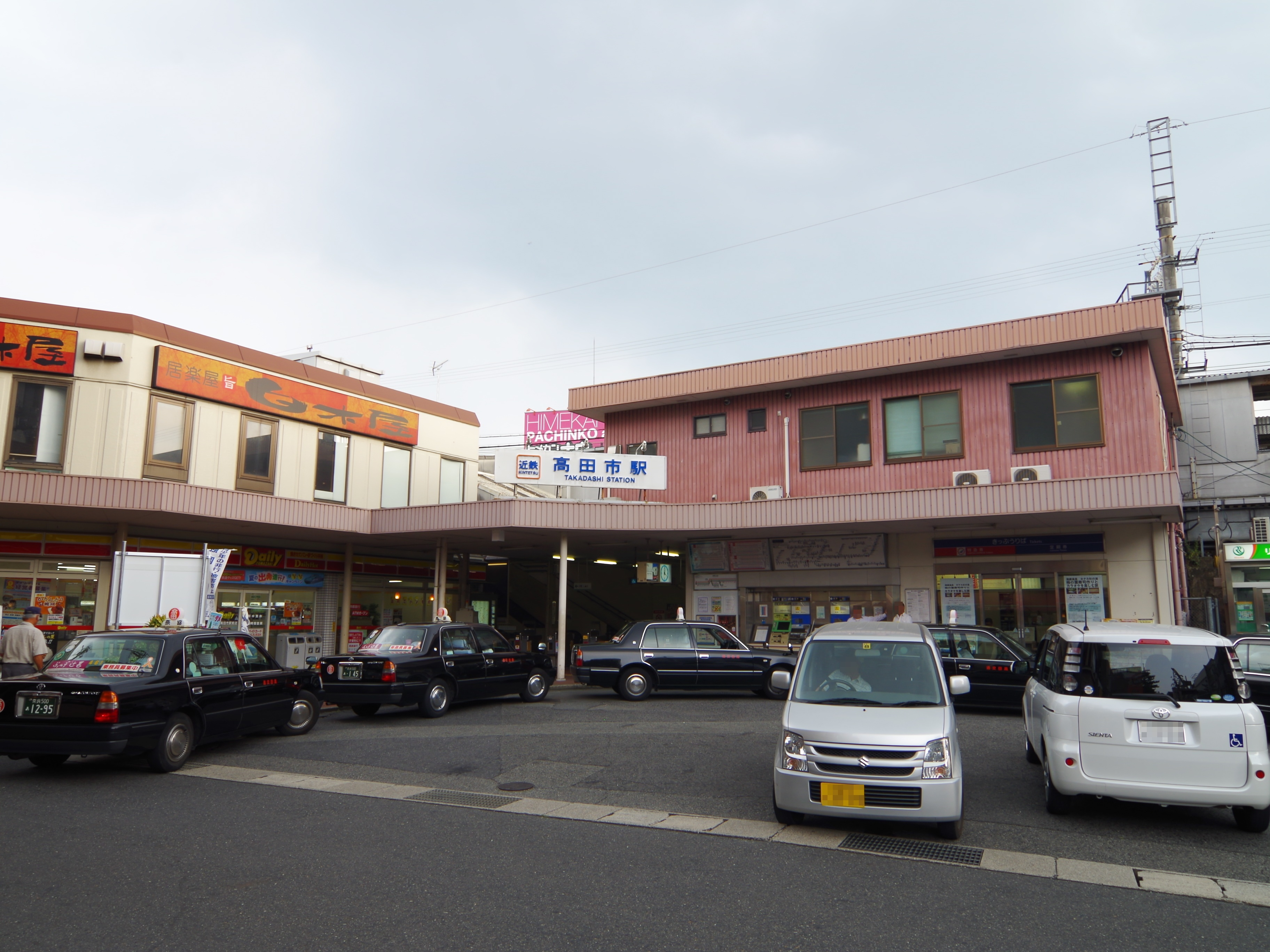
- Takadashi Station in August 2013

General information
- Location: 17-4, Katashio-chō, Yamatotakada-shi, Nara-ken 635-0046; Japan
- Coordinates: 34°30′25″N 135°44′34″E
- Operator: Kintetsu Railway
- Line: F Minami Osaka Line
- Distance: 34.2 km from Ōsaka Abenobashi
- Platforms: 2 side platforms
- Tracks: 2

Other information
- Status: Staffed
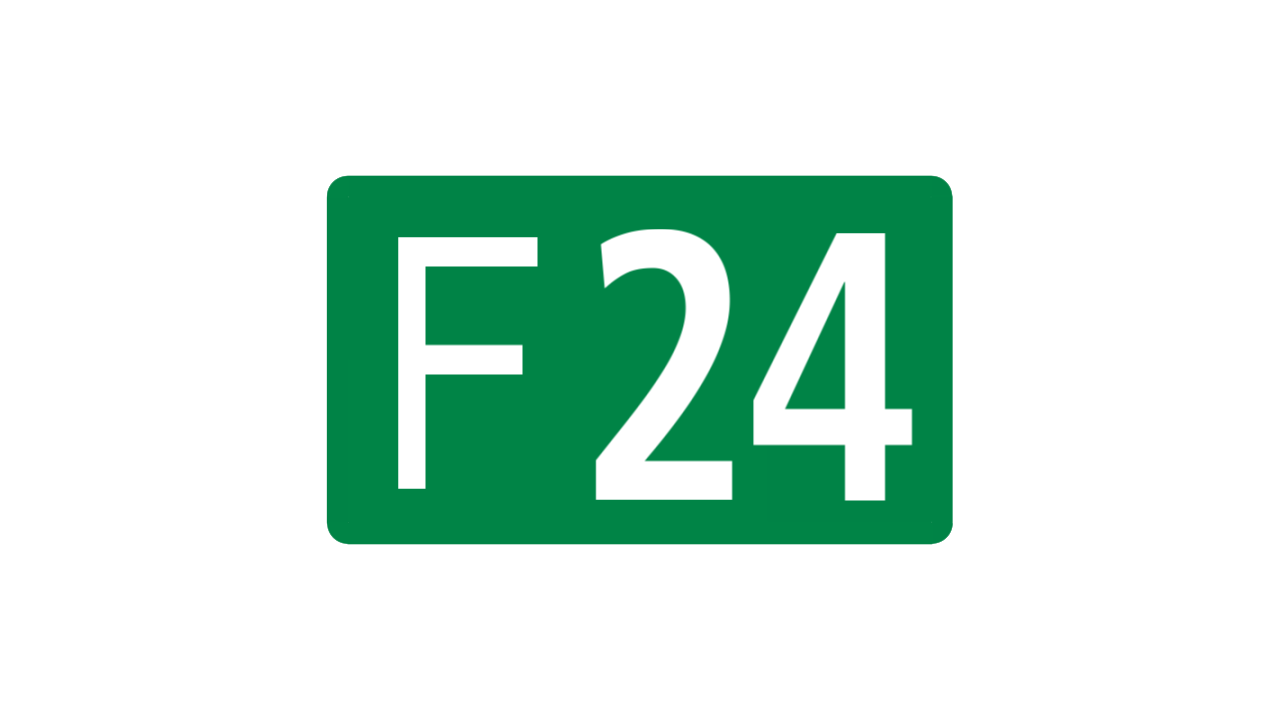
- Station code
- Website: Official website

History
- Opened: 29 March 1929
- Former names: Takadachō (until 1948)

Passengers
- FY2019: 3878 daily

Services
Preceding station	Kintetsu Railway	Following station
Shakudo towards Ōsaka Abenobashi	Minami Osaka Line Local Semi-Express	Ukiana towards Kashiharajingū-mae
Shakudo towards Ōsaka Abenobashi	Minami Osaka Line Express Rapid Express	Kashiharajingū-mae Terminus
Location
- Location within Nara Prefecture Location within Japan

Takadashi Station (高田市駅, Takadashi-eki) is a passenger railway station located in the city of Yamatotakada, Nara Prefecture, Japan. It is operated by the private transportation company, Kintetsu Railway.

== Line ==
Takadashi Station is served by the Minami Osaka Line and is 34.2 kilometers from the starting point of the line at Ōsaka Abenobashi.

== Layout ==
The station has two opposed side platforms on the ground, connected by a level crossing. The effective length of the platform is six cars. The station is staffed.

=== Platforms ===
1	■ Minami Osaka Line	for Kashiharajingū-mae and Yoshino
2	■ Minami Osaka Line	for Furuichi and Ōsaka Abenobashi

== History ==
Takedashi Station opened as Takadamachi Station (高田町駅) on 29 March 1929 when Osaka Railway extended its line from Furuichi to Kumedera (now Kashiharajingu-mae). On 1 February 1943, the line merged with the Kansai Express Railway and became the Kansai Express Railway's Tennoji Line. This line was merged with the Nankai Electric Railway on 1 June 1944 to form Kintetsu. On 1 January 1948 with the town of Takada becoming the city of Yamato-Takada, the station was renamed to its present name.

== Passenger statistics ==
In fiscal 2019, the station was used by an average of 3878 passengers daily (boarding passengers only).

== Surrounding area ==
- Isozonoza Takumushidama Shrine
- Yamatotakada Municipal Hospital
- Yamatotakada Sazanka Hall (Yamatotakada Cultural Center)
- Nara Prefectural Takada High School

== See also ==
- List of railway stations in Japan
