= Yoshino Line =

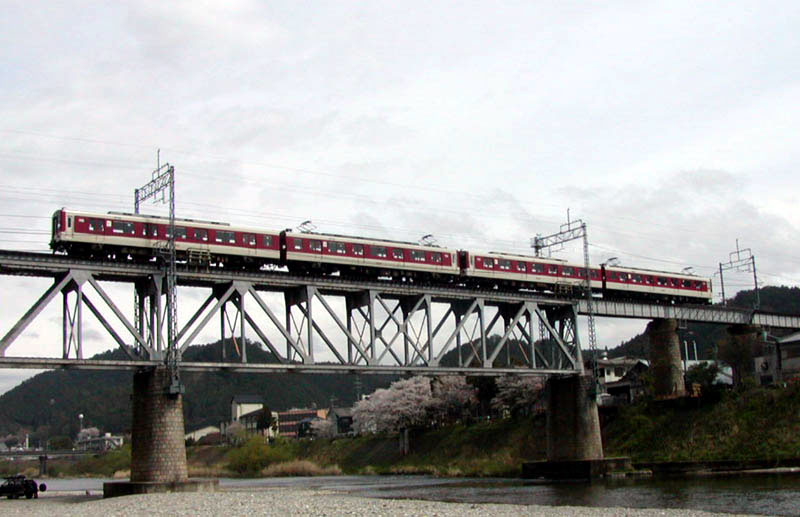

Overview
- Owner: Kintetsu Railway
- Line number: F
- Locale: Nara Prefecture
- Termini: Kashihara-Jingūmae; Yoshino
- Stations: 16
- Color on map: (#008446)

Service
- Type: Commuter rail
- System: Kintetsu Railway
- Operator(s): Kintetsu Railway
- Depot(s): Muda (branch depot of Furuichi Inspection Depot)

History
- Opened: 25 October 1912; 112 years ago
- Last extension: 25 March 1928; 97 years ago

Technical
- Line length: 25.2 km (15.7 mi)
- Number of tracks: Single-track
- Track gauge: 1,067 mm (3 ft 6 in)
- Minimum radius: 160 m (520 ft)
- Electrification: 1,500 V DC (overhead line)
- Operating speed: 100 km/h (60 mph)
- Signalling: Automatic closing block
- Train protection system: Kintetsu ATS

The Yoshino Line (吉野線, Yoshino-sen) is a railway line in Nara Prefecture, Japan, operated by the private railway operator Kintetsu Railway. It connects Kashihara-Jingūmae in Kashihara and Yoshino in Yoshino. All Express and Limited Express trains continue to and from Ōsaka Abenobashi Station on the Minami Osaka Line.

== History ==
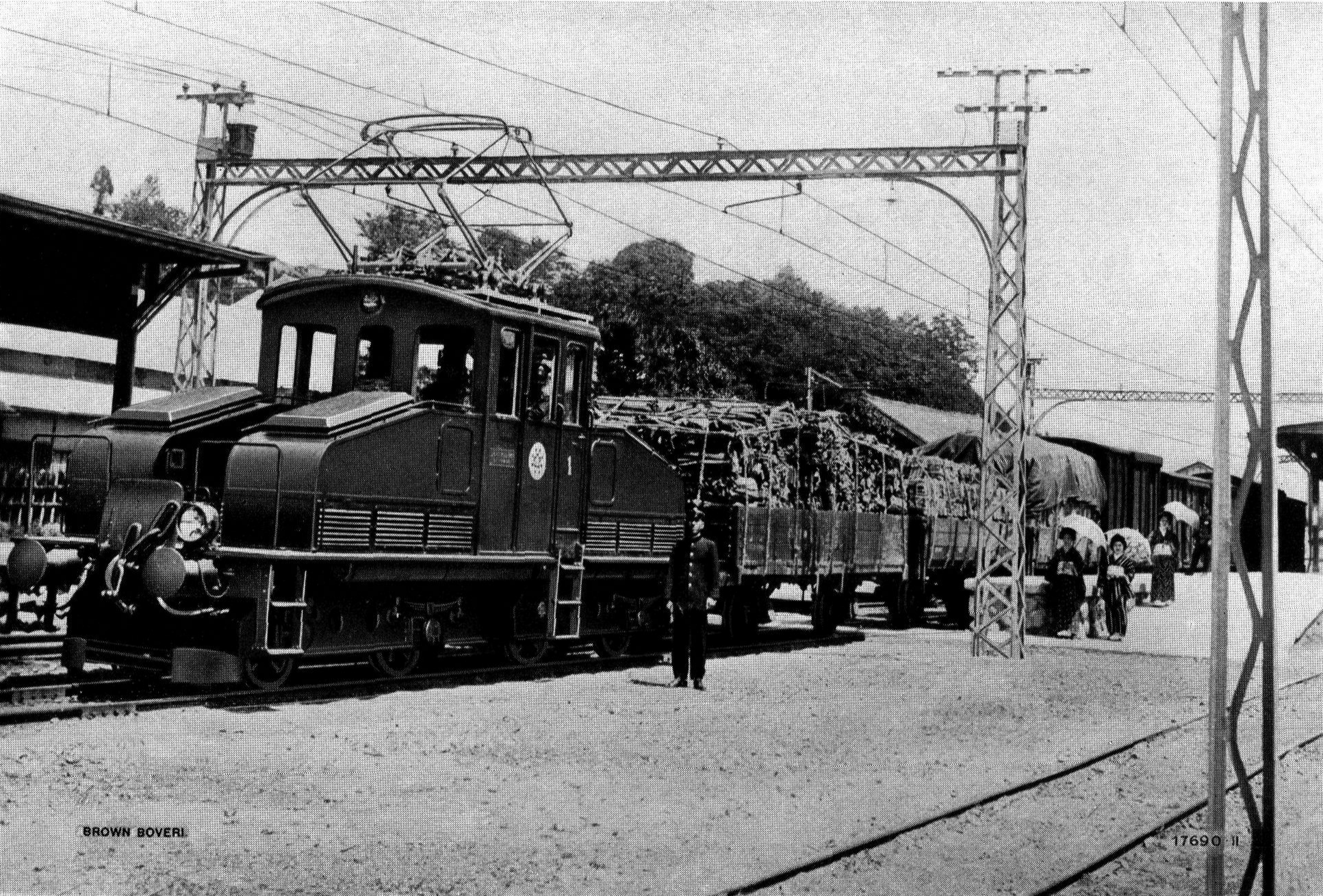
Electric freight train at Shimoichiguchi Station ca 1925

The Yoshino Railway (吉野鉄道) Co. opened the Yoshino - Muda section in 1912, and extended the line to Kashiharajingū-mae in 1923, electrifying the entire line at 1500 VDC at that time. Amongst the rolling stock were three Bo'Bo' goodtrain locomotives delivered from Brown, Boveri & Cie in Switzerland.

In 1929 the company merged with the Osaka Electric Railway Co., which merged with Kintetsu in 1944.

Freight services ceased in 1984, and CTC signalling was commissioned in 2001.

Kintetsu Railway introduced the Blue Symphony sight-seeing train on this line in 2018. The special train runs twice a day in both directions.

== Stations ==
- O: stop,
- |: pass
- (Express trains, local trains, and semi-express trains stop at every station.)

No.	Station	Japanese	Distance (km)	Limited Express	Transfers	Location	
F42	Kashiharajingū-mae	橿原神宮前	0.0	O	F Minami Osaka Line (Through services available); B Kashihara Line (B42)	Kashihara	Nara Prefecture
F43	Okadera	岡寺	1.1	|		Kashihara	Nara Prefecture
F44	Asuka	飛鳥	2.2	O		Asuka, Takaichi District	Nara Prefecture
F45	Tsubosakayama	壺阪山	3.9	O		Takatori, Takaichi District	Nara Prefecture
F46	Ichio	市尾	6.0	|		Takatori, Takaichi District	Nara Prefecture
F47	Kuzu	葛	7.9	|		Gose	Nara Prefecture
F48	Yoshinoguchi	吉野口	9.5	O	T Wakayama Line	Gose	Nara Prefecture
F49	Kusurimizu	薬水	11.2	|		Ōyodo, Yoshino District	Nara Prefecture
F50	Fukugami	福神	12.8	O		Ōyodo, Yoshino District	Nara Prefecture
F51	Ōada	大阿太	14.6	|		Ōyodo, Yoshino District	Nara Prefecture
F52	Shimoichiguchi	下市口	17.0	O		Ōyodo, Yoshino District	Nara Prefecture
F53	Koshibe	越部	18.7	|		Ōyodo, Yoshino District	Nara Prefecture
F54	Muda	六田	20.7	O		Ōyodo, Yoshino District	Nara Prefecture
F55	Yamato-Kamiichi	大和上市	22.9	O		Yoshino, Yoshino District	Nara Prefecture
F56	Yoshino-Jingū	吉野神宮	23.7	O		Yoshino, Yoshino District	Nara Prefecture
F57	Yoshino	吉野	25.2	O	Yoshino Ropeway	Yoshino, Yoshino District	Nara Prefecture
