= Yoshino Ropeway =

Aerial tramway in Nara, Japan

Coordinates: 34°22′25.7″N 135°51′17.3″E

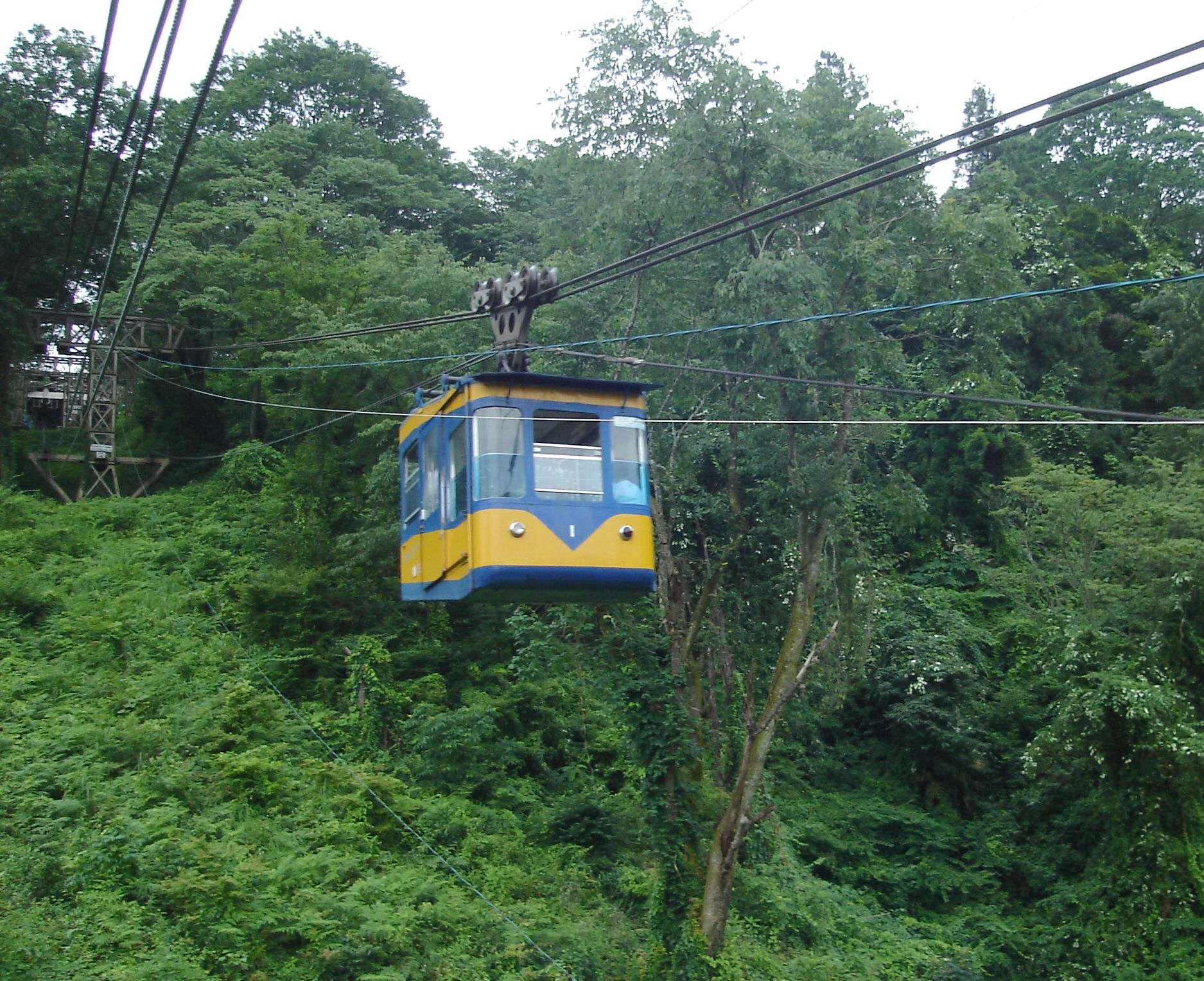
Yoshino Ropeway

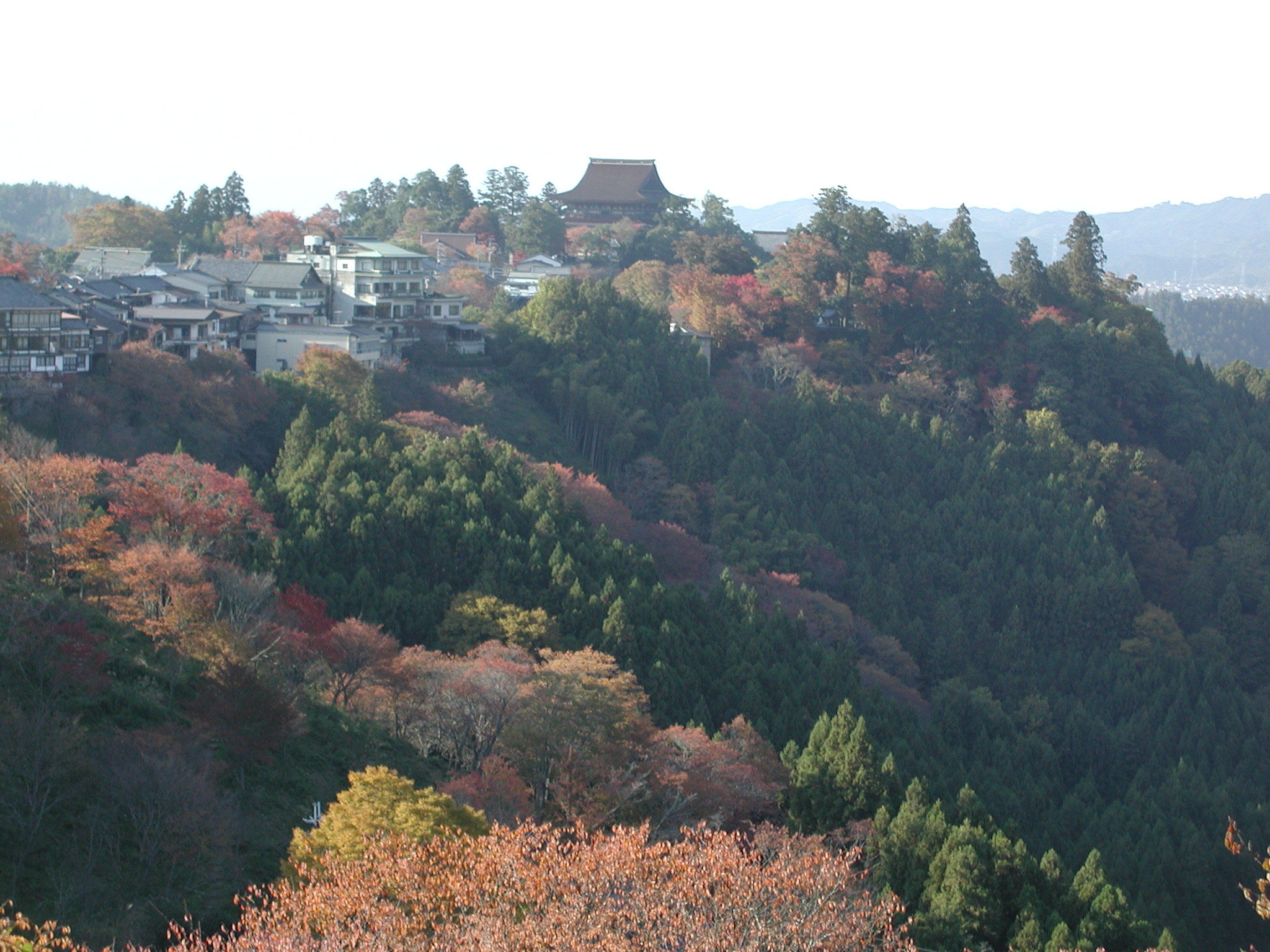
Mount Yoshino

The Yoshino Ropeway (吉野ロープウェイ, Yoshino Rōpuwei) is an aerial tramway in Mount Yoshino, Yoshino, Nara, Japan, operated by Yoshino Ōmine Kēburu Ropeway Bus Co., Ltd. This is the oldest surviving aerial lift line in the nation. The line opened on March 12, 1929, a year after Yoshino Railway, the current Kintetsu Yoshino Line, opened the railway line to Yoshino Station.

== History ==
The ropeway was opened on March 12, 1929, a year after Yoshino Railway, the current Kintetsu Yoshino Line, opened the railway line to Yoshino Station. The ropeway was not deconstructed for metal parts during the Pacific War. It is the oldest ropeway in Japan, and has been designated as a Mechanical Engineering Heritage in 2012 for its contributions to technological development. On April 28, 2017, a cabin collided with a part of a station, and the ropeway suspended all operations until March 23, 2019 due to financial difficulties.

== Services ==
Cabins operate once every 15 minutes. The ropeway does not operate on Tuesday, Wednesday, Thursday. The whole ride takes 3 minutes.

== Infrastructure ==
The line uses two cabins. Although the cabins and cables have been updated, the spans are still those constructed in 1928.

== See also ==
- List of aerial lifts in Japan
