= Yoshinoguchi Station =

Railway station in Gose, Nara Prefecture, Japan

Yoshinoguchi Station 吉野口駅
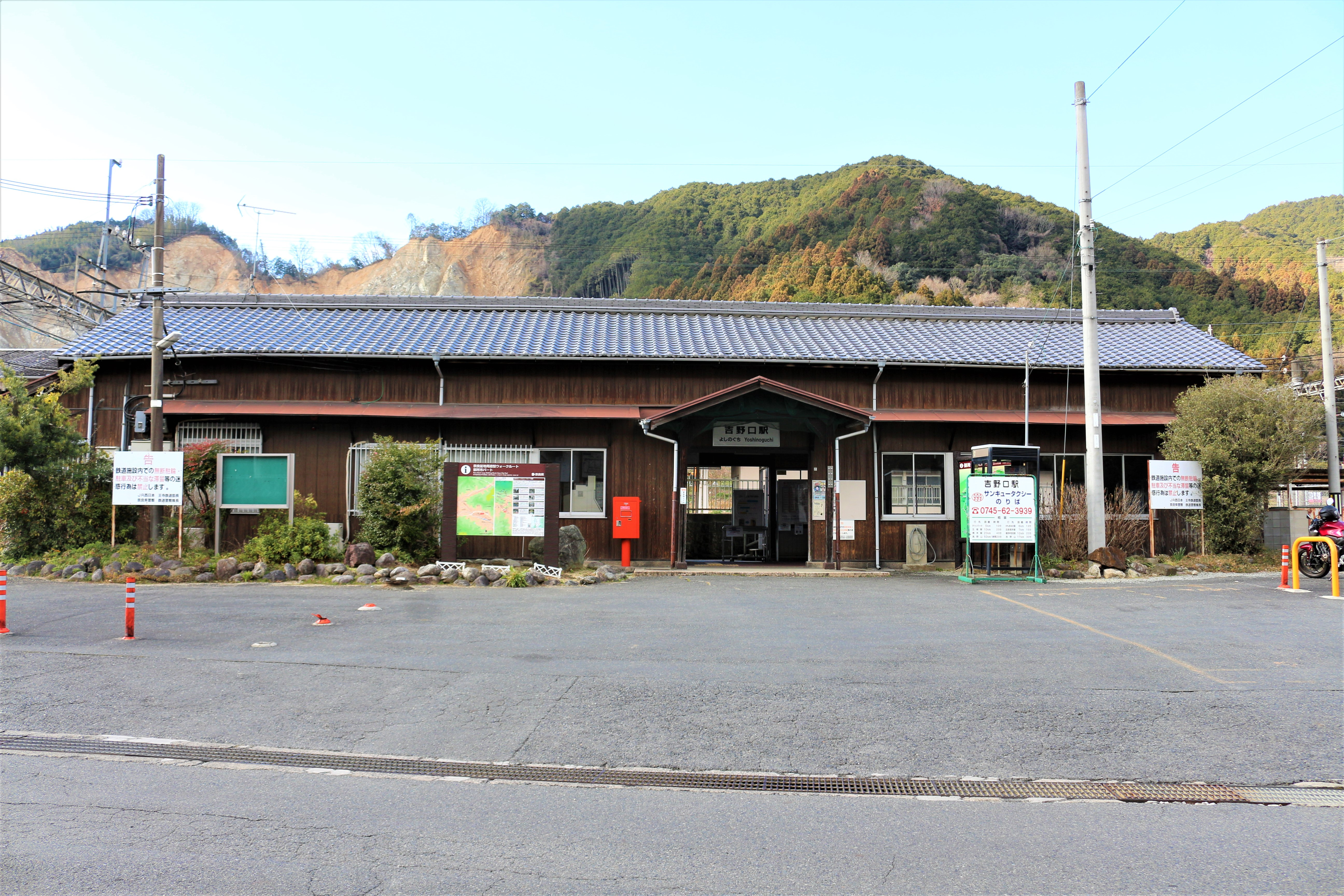

General information
- Location: 442, Furuse, Gose-shi, Nara-ken 639-2254; Japan
- Coordinates: 34°25′14″N 135°45′02″E
- System: commuter rail station
- Owner: West Japan Railway Company (JR-West)
- Operator: West Japan Railway Company (JR-West); Kintetsu Railway
- Lines: T Wakayama Line; F Yoshino Line
- Distance: JR-West: 24.9 km (15.5 miles) from Ōji; Kintetsu: 9.5 km (5.9 miles) from Kashiharajingu-mae
- Platforms: JR-West: 1 side platform and 1 island platform; Kintetsu: 2 side platforms
- Tracks: JR-West: 3; Kintetsu: 2
- Train operators: JR-West; Kintetsu Railway
- Bus stands: 1
- Connections: Gose City Community Bus: Himawari-gō East Course

Construction
- Structure type: At grade
- Parking: Available
- Cycle facilities: Available
- Accessible: Yes (2 accessible slopes between the ticket gate and the northbound platform)

Other information
- Station code: Kintetsu: F48
- Website: http://www.jr-odekake.net/eki/top.php?id=0621809 www.kintetsu.co.jp/station/station_info/en_station08011.html

History
- Opened: 10 May 1896
- Rebuilt: 1912
- Electrified: JR-West: 1980; Kintetsu: 1923
- Former names: Kuzu (1896—1903)

Passengers
- 2012 / 2015: JR-West: 583 daily; Kintetsu: 1,357 daily
Services
Preceding station	JR West	Following station
Kitauchi towards Ōji	Wakayama Line Local	Wakigami towards Wakayama
Preceding station	Kintetsu Railway	Following station
F Yoshino Line
Kuzu towards Ōsaka-Abenobashi, Furuichi or Kashiharajingū-mae	Local	Kusurimizu towards Yoshino or Muda
Kuzu towards Ōsaka-Abenobashi, Furuichi or Kashiharajingū-mae	Local	Terminus
Kuzu towards Ōsaka-Abenobashi	Semi-express	Kusurimizu towards Yoshino
Kuzu towards Ōsaka-Abenobashi	Express	Kusurimizu towards Yoshino
Tsubosakayama towards Ōsaka-Abenobashi	Limited Express	Fukugami towards Yoshino
Tsubosakayama towards Ōsaka-Abenobashi	Sakura Liner	Fukugami towards Yoshino
Location

Yoshinoguchi Station (吉野口駅, Yoshinoguchi-eki) is a junction passenger railway station located in the city of Gose, Nara Prefecture, Japan. It is jointly operated by the West Japan Railway Company (JR West) and the private transportation company, Kintetsu Railway.

== Lines ==
Yoshinoguchi Station is served by the Wakayama Line and is 24.9 kilometers from the terminus of that line at Ōji. It is also served by the Yoshino Line and is 9.5 kilometers from the starting point of the line at Kashiharajingū-mae and 49.2 kilometers from Osaka Abenobashi.

== Layout ==
The station is an above-ground station with a total of three platforms and five tracks, one side platform and two island platforms with four tracks, and the old wooden station building from when the station first opened still remains. JR uses two platforms and three tracks, while Kintetsu uses two platforms and two tracks (one of the island platforms is shared by JR and Kintetsu). Therefore, it is possible to transfer between JR and Kintetsu within the ticket gates, and in certain cases, it is possible to transfer on the same platform. The station building is on the east side, and is connected to the island platform by an underground passage. There are more Kintetsu trains, and the longest trains that currently stop there are four cars for both JR and Kintetsu. The station name signs are standardized to JR West specifications, including the Kintetsu Line platforms, but the Kintetsu Line platforms do not have the JR logo, but instead have the Kintetsu station number. The JR station is staffed.

=== Platforms ===
1	■ Yoshino Line—Local	for Yoshino and Muda
1	■ Yoshino Line—Semi-express	for Yoshino
1	■ Yoshino Line—Express	for Yoshino
1	■ Yoshino Line—Limited Express	for Yoshino
1	■ Yoshino Line—Limited Express Sakura Liner	for Yoshino
2	■ Yoshino Line—Local	for Ōsaka-Abenobashi, Furuichi, and Kashiharajingū-mae
2	■ Yoshino Line—Semi-express	for Ōsaka-Abenobashi
2	■ Yoshino Line—Express	for Ōsaka-Abenobashi
2	■ Yoshino Line—Limited Express	for Ōsaka-Abenobashi
2	■ Yoshino Line—Limited Express Sakura Liner	for Ōsaka-Abenobashi
3	■ Wakayama Line—Local	for Gojō, Kokawa, and Wakayama
3	■ Wakayama Line—Regional Rapid Service	for Gojō
3	■ Wakayama Line—Yamatoji Rapid Service	for Gojō
4	■ Wakayama Line—Local	for Takada, Ōji and Nara
4	■ Wakayama Line—Rapid Service	for JR Namba
5	■ Wakayama Line—Local	for Ōji

== History ==
Yoshinoguchi Station was opened 10 May 1896 as Kuzu Station (葛駅) on the Nanwa Railway. It was renamed to its present name on 15 May 1903. In 1904, the Kansai Railway took over the Nanwa Railway, and was nationalized in 1907. On 15 October 1912, the Yoshino Light Railway (the predecessor of the Kintetsu Yoshino Line) began operations. Through a number of mergers, this became the Kintetsu Railway on 1 June 1944.

== Passenger statistics ==
In fiscal 2019 the JR portion of the station was used by an average of 587 passengers daily (boarding passengers only). The Kintetsu portion of the station was used by 714 passengers daily.

== Surrounding area ==
- Japan National Route 309
- Gose City Kuzu Elementary and Junior High School
- Japan Pharmaceutical Manufacturing Head Office

== See also ==
- List of railway stations in Japan
