= Kashiharajingū-mae Station =

Railway station in Kashihara, Nara Prefecture, Japan

Kashiharajingū-mae Station 橿原神宮前駅
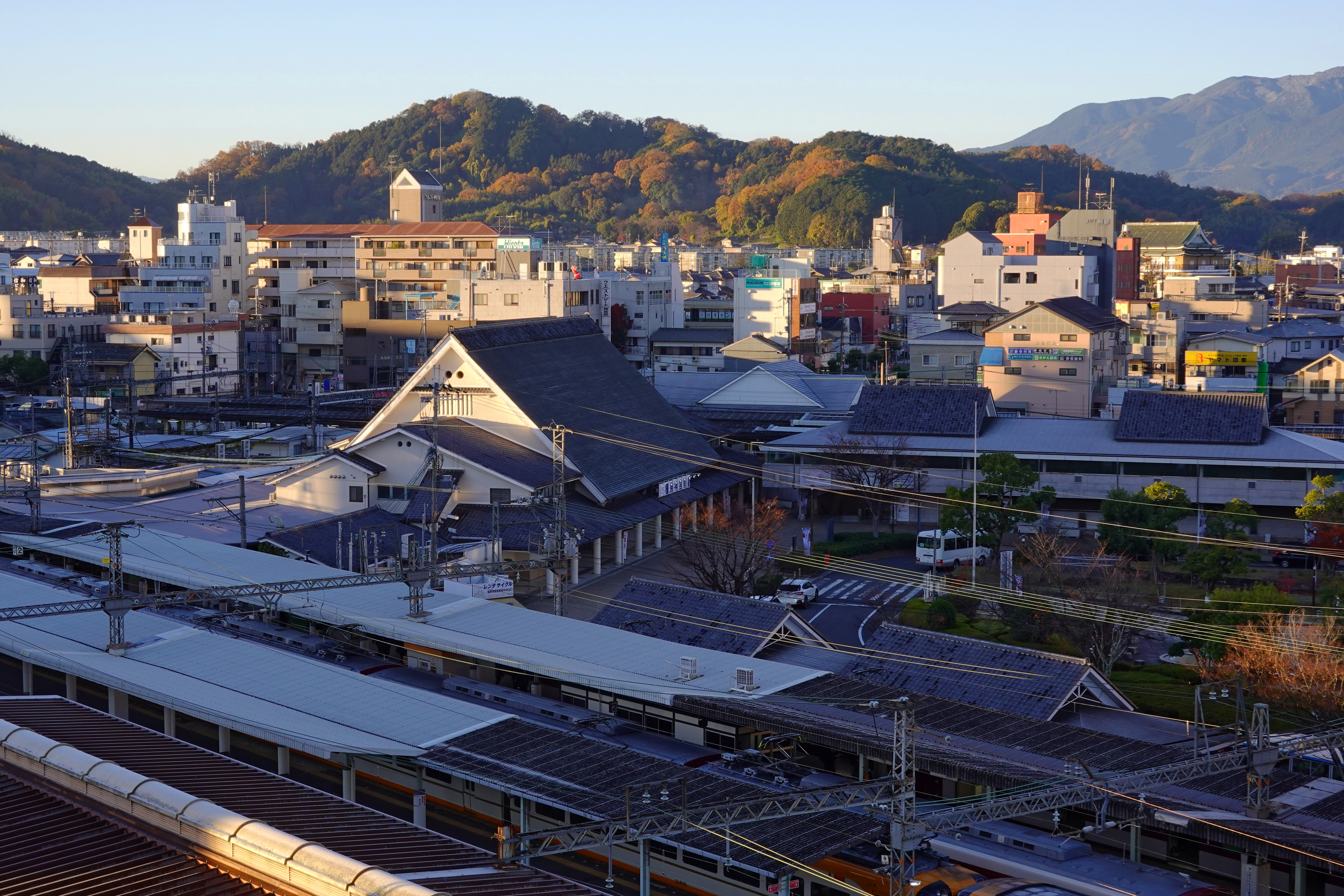

General information
- Location: 618, Kumechō, Kashihara; Nara 634-0063 （奈良県橿原市久米町618） Japan
- Coordinates: 34°29′04″N 135°47′40″E
- System: Kintetsu Railway commuter rail station
- Owner: Kintetsu Railway
- Operator: Kintetsu Railway
- Lines: B Kashihara Line; F Minami Osaka Line; F Yoshino Line
- Distance: Kashihara Line: 23.8 km (14.8 miles); Minami Osaka Line: 39.7 km (24.7 miles); Yoshino Line: 0 km (0 miles)
- Platforms: 4 island platforms
- Tracks: 9 (Including on-premises lines)
- Train operators: Kintetsu Railway
- Bus stands: 1
- Connections: Nara Kotsu Bus Lines: 2・5・7・8・9・11・12・16・18・19・23・51・53・52 at Kashiharajingū-eki higashi-guchi; Nara Kotsu Bus Lines: 25・26・28・33・36・37 at Kashiharajingū-eki; Asuka Village Kame Bus: Aka-kame (Asuka Excursion Bus)

Construction
- Structure type: At grade
- Parking: Available
- Cycle facilities: Available
- Accessible: Yes (1 elevator for the west ticket gate, 1 elavator between the west and the central ticket gates, 1 elevator for each Osaka-bound platform, 1 accessible slope for each Kyoto-bound platform, 1 accessible bathroom, and equipped wheelchairs)

Other information
- Station code: B42 / F42
- Website: Official website

History
- Opened: 21 March 1929
- Rebuilt: 1939; 87 years ago
- Former names: Kashiharajingū-eki (1939—1970); Kumedera (1923—1940) / Kashiharajingū-mae (1923—1939)

Passengers
- 2015: 18,862
Services
Preceding station	Kintetsu Railway	Following station
B Kashihara Line
Unebigoryōmae towards Kyōto, Shin-Tanabe or Yamato-Saidaiji	Local	Terminus
Unebigoryōmae towards Kyōto or Yamato-Saidaiji	Express	Terminus
Yamato-Yagi towards Kyōto	Limited Express	Terminus
F Minami Osaka Line
Kashiharajingū-nishiguchi towards Ōsaka-Abenobashi, Furuichi or Shakudo	Local	through to Yoshino Line
Kashiharajingū-nishiguchi towards Ōsaka-Abenobashi, Furuichi or Shakudo	Local	Terminus
Kashiharajingū-nishiguchi towards Ōsaka-Abenobashi	Semi-express	through to Yoshino Line
Kashiharajingū-nishiguchi towards Ōsaka-Abenobashi	Semi-express	Terminus
Kashiharajingū-nishiguchi towards Ōsaka-Abenobashi	Suburban Express	Terminus
Takadashi towards Ōsaka-Abenobashi	Express	through to Yoshino Line
Takadashi towards Ōsaka-Abenobashi	Express	Terminus
Takadashi towards Ōsaka-Abenobashi	Limited Express	through to Yoshino Line
Takadashi towards Ōsaka-Abenobashi	Sakura Liner	through to Yoshino Line
F Yoshino Line
through to Minami Osaka Line	Local	Okadera towards Yoshino, Muda, Yoshinoguchi or Tsubosakayama
Terminus	Local	Okadera towards Yoshino, Muda, Yoshinoguchi or Tsubosakayama
through to Minami Osaka Line	Semi-express	Okadera towards Yoshino
through to Minami Osaka Line	Express	Okadera towards Yoshino
through to Minami Osaka Line	Limited Express	Asuka towards Yoshino
through to Minami Osaka Line	Sakura Liner	Asuka towards Yoshino
Location

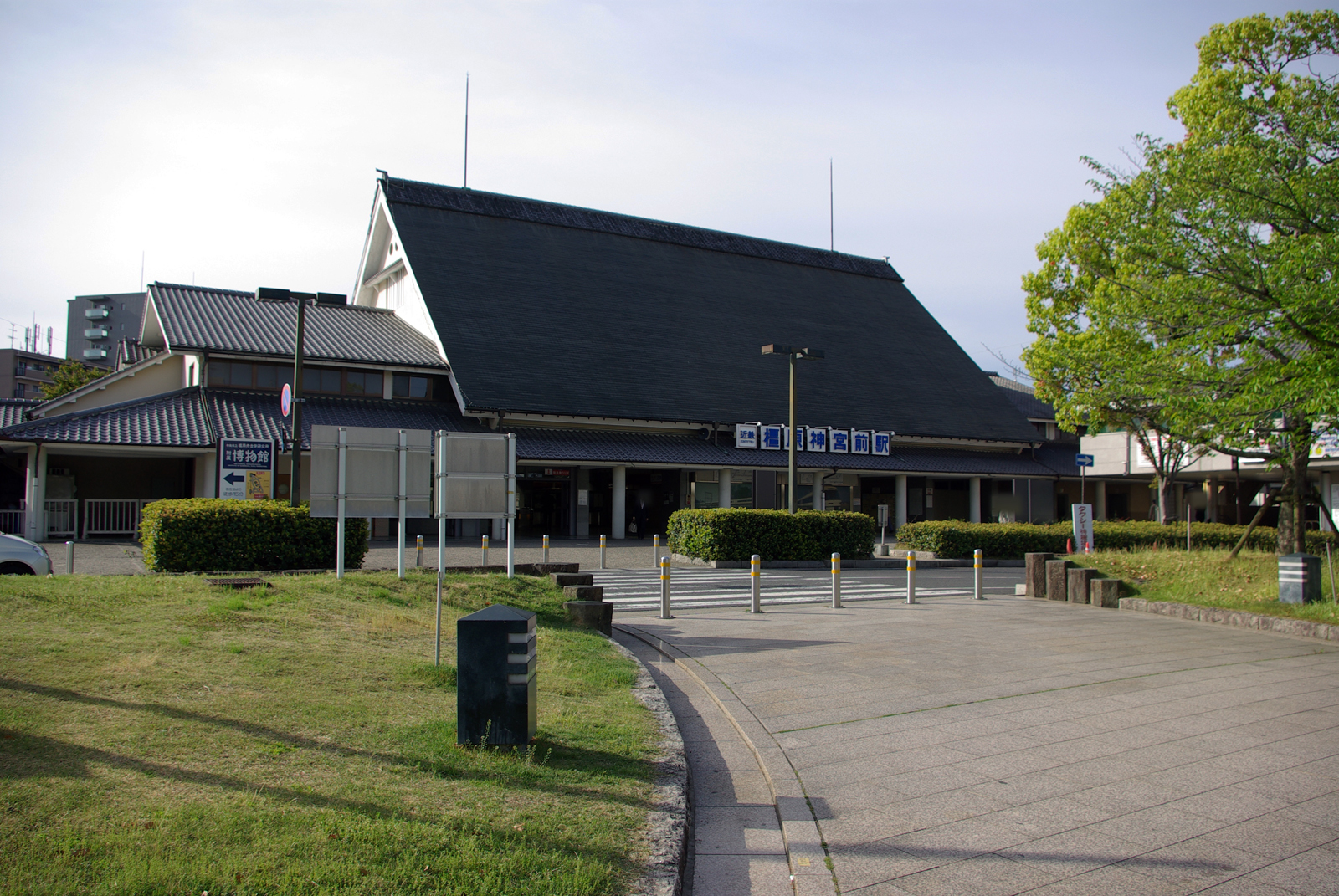
The central entrance of the station building designed by Togo Murano

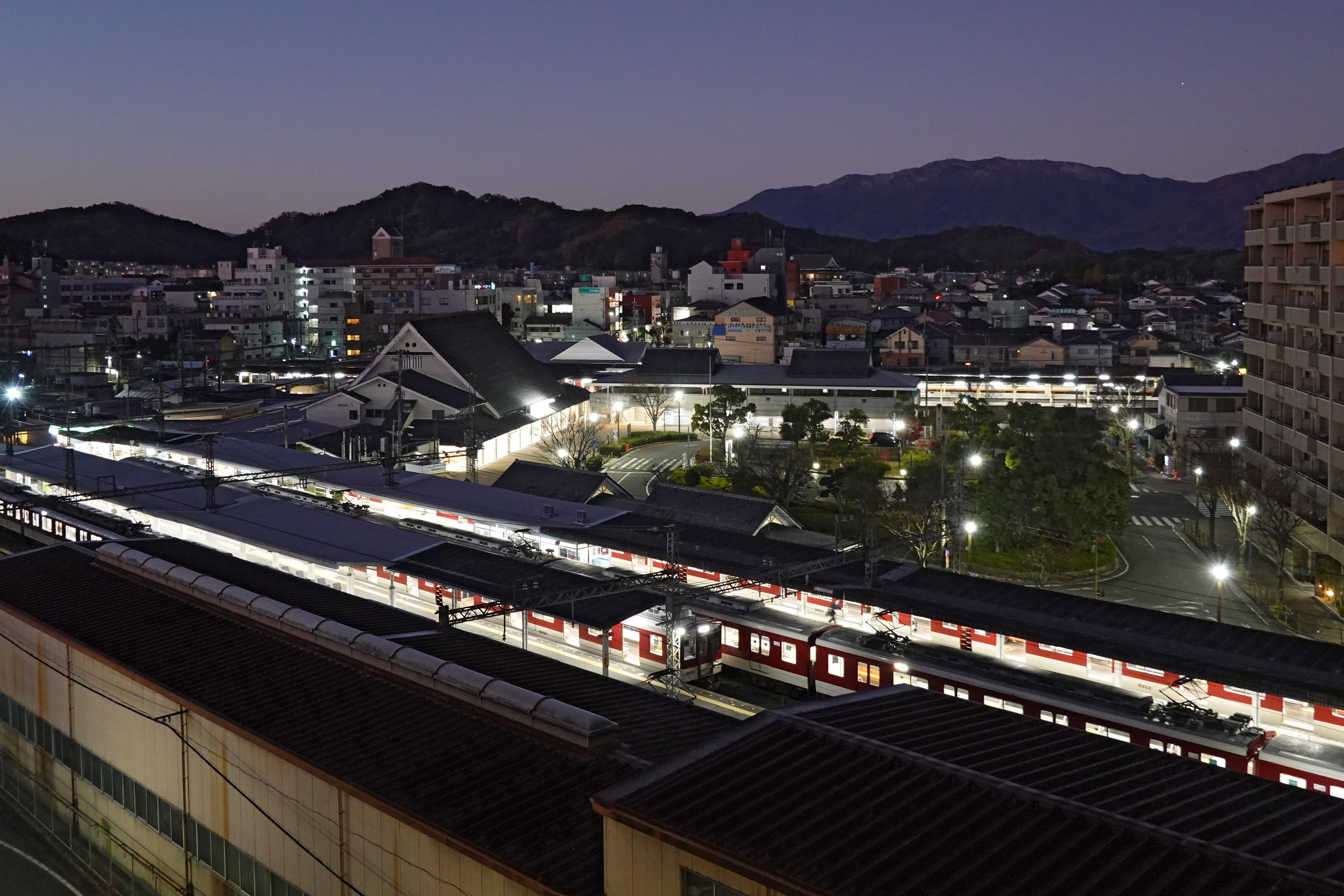
Night view

Kashiharajingū-mae Station (橿原神宮前駅, Kashiharajingū-mae-eki) is a train station located in Kashihara, Nara Prefecture, Japan. It is on Kintetsu Kashihara Line, Minami Osaka Line and Yoshino Lines. It is one of the major stations on the Kintetsu lines and all trains in service stop at this station.

The center station building was designed by Togo Murano, an architect representing the 20th century.

== Lines ==
- Kintetsu Railway
  - B Kashihara Line
  - F Minami Osaka Line
  - F Yoshino Line

== Platforms and tracks ==
This station has two island platforms serving 4 narrow gauge (1,067 mm (3 ft 6 in)) tracks for the Minami Osaka Line and the Yoshino Line in the west, and two island platforms serving 3 standard gauge (1,435 mm (4 ft 8 1/2 in)) tracks for the Kashihara Line and a narrow gauge (1,067 mm) track for the Yoshino Line in the east.

0	■ Kashihara Line—Yoshino Line	(Chartered and maintenance trains only)
1 - 3	■ Kashihara Line	for Yamato-Yagi, Yamato-Saidaiji and Kyoto
4,5	■ Yoshino Line	for Asuka and Yoshino
6,7	■ Minami Osaka Line	for Furuichi, Fujiidera and Osaka Abenobashi

== Ridership ==
The number of passengers who get on and off trains at this station is 19,960 persons per day, according to the research by Kintetsu Corporation on November 9, 2010.

== Connections ==
Buses are operated by Nara Kotsu Bus Lines.

As of October 2014

West stop (Kashiharajingu-eki nishiguchi)
- Route 25 for Minami-Shirakashi
- Route 26 and 28 for Minami-Shirakashi via Minami-Myohojicho
- Route 28 for Yagi Station via Kashihara Gymnasium Unebigoryo-mae, Idai-byoin-mae (Nara Medical University Hospital), and Kashihara City Hall
- Route 53 for Yagi Station via Ousa, Idai-byoin Genkanguchi (Nara Medical University Hospital), and Kashihara City Hall
- Route 53 for Kintetsu Gose Station via Gunkaibashi and Daikancho
Center stop (Kashiharajingu-eki)
- Route 28 for Yagi Station via Unebigoryo-mae, Idai-byoin-mae (Nara Medical University Hospital), and Kashihara City Hall
- Route 28 for Minami-Shirakashi via Kashiharajingu-eki-nishiguchi and Minami-Myohojicho
East stop 1 (Kashiharajingu-eki higashiguchi)
- Route 8 for Yagi Station via Ousa and Idai-byoin-mae (Nara Medical University Hospital)
- Routes 51, 52 and 53 for Yagi Station via Ousa and Idai-byoin Genkanguchi (Nara Medical University Hospital)
- Route 51 for Oyodo Bus Center via Kamihigaimoto
- Route 53 for Kintetsu Gose Station via Kashiharajingu-eki nishiguchi, Gunkaibashi, and Daikancho

Town Office

East stop 2 (Kashiharajingu-eki higashiguchi)
- Route 2 for Okadera-mae for Toyoura and Asuka Daibutsu-mae (mornings)
- Route 5 for Okadera-mae via Shobucho Yonchome-minami
- Route 7 for Shobusho Yonchome-minani via Shobucho Itchome, Shobucho Sanchome and Shobucho Yonchome
- Route 8 and 9 for Shobusho Yonchome via Shobucho Itchome and Shobucho Sanchome
- Route 11 for Shuhodai via Okadera Station
- Route 12 for Shuhodai via Shobucho Yonchome
- Route 15 "Aka-Kame" for Hinokuma via Asuka Station
- Route 16 "Aka-Kame" for Asuka Station via Asuka Historical Museum, Man'yo Bunkakan (Complex of Man'yo Culture) and Ishibutai
- Route 17 "Aka-Kame" for Okahashimoto via Asuka Historical Museum, Man'yo Bunkakan (Complex of Man'yo Culture) and Ishibutai
- Route 18 for Kashiharajingu-eki higashiguchi via Shobucho Yonchome-minami, Okadera-mae, Asuka Daibutsu-mae and Toyoura (evenings)
- Route 19 for Kashiharajingu-eki higashiguchi via Toyoura, Asuka Daibutsu-mae, Okadera-mae and Shobucho Yonchome-minami (mornings)
- Route 23 "Aka-Kame" for Asuka Station via Asuka-Koyama, Asuka Historical Museum, Man'yo Bunkakan (Complex of Man'yo Culture) and Ishibutai
- Route 文 for Kenko Fukushi Center for Toyoura and Asuka Daibutsu-mae and Okadera-mae (operated on school days)

== Stores in Kashiharajingu-mae Station ==
- Wakakusa shoten (Book shop)
- Matsumoto-Kiyoshi (Drug store)
- Kiharu (Japanese food restaurant)
- FamilyMart (Convenience store)
- Doutor Coffee
- Small convenience store on Platforms Nos. 6 and 7
- ATM (Bank of Nanto)

== Around Kashiharajingu-mae Station ==
- Kashihara Royal Hotel (East Exit)
- Kashihara Kanko Hotel (Center Exit)
- Kashihara Park (Center Exit)
  - Athletic Stadium
  - Baseball Stadium
- Mister Donut (West Exit)
- Daily Yamazaki (West Exit)
- Kashihara Shrine (Center Exit)
