= Yoshino Station (Nara) =

Railway station in Yoshino, Nara Prefecture, Japan

Yoshino Station 吉野駅
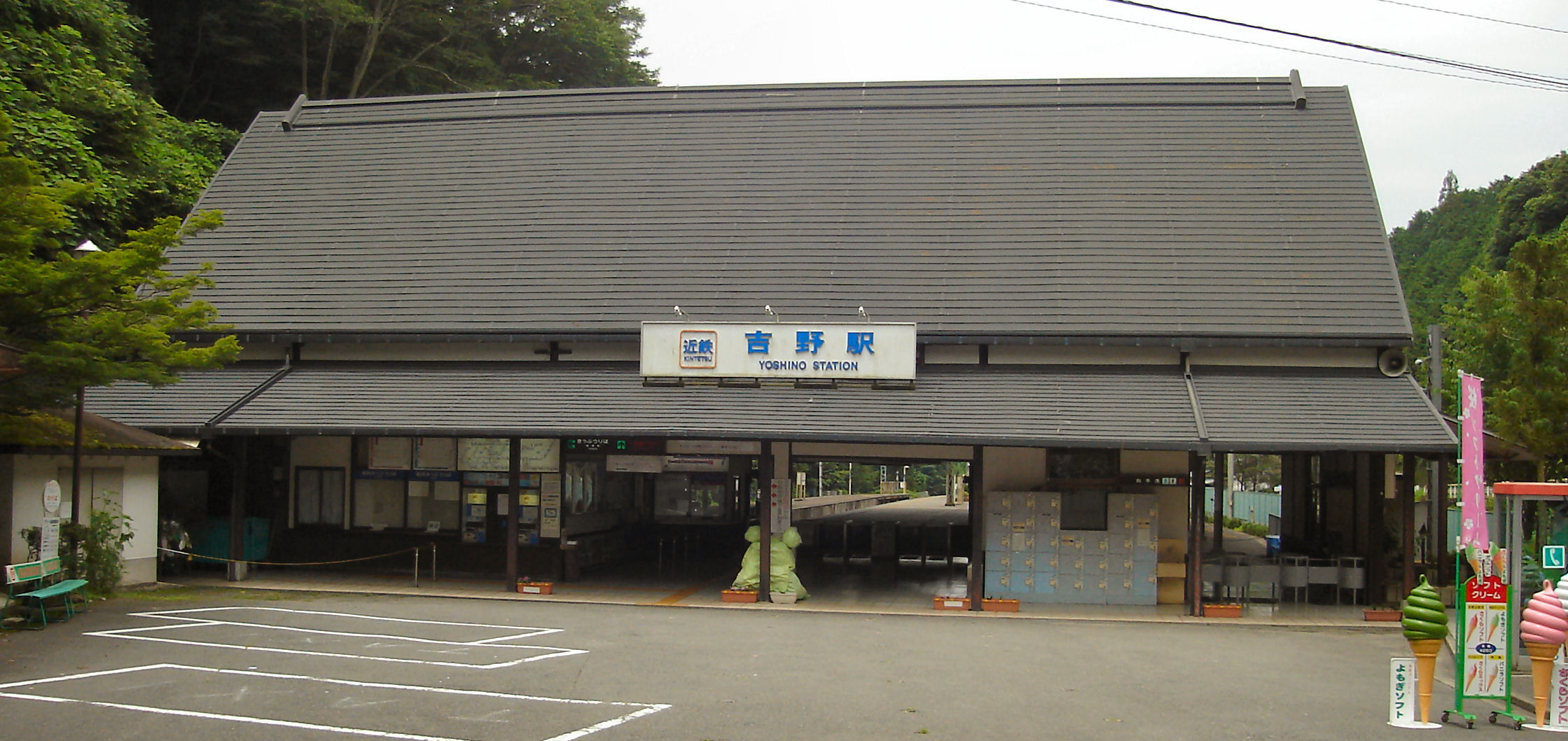

General information
- Location: 6261, Yoshinoyama, Yoshino-cho, Yoshino-gun, Nara-ken 639-3115; Japan
- Coordinates: 34°22′37″N 135°51′13″E
- System: Kintetsu Railway commuter rail station
- Owner: Kintetsu Railway
- Operator: Kintetsu Railway
- Line: F Yoshino Line
- Distance: 25.2 km (15.7 miles)
- Platforms: 3 bay platforms
- Tracks: 4
- Train operators: Kintetsu Railway
- Bus stands: 1
- Connections: Yoshino Omine Cable: Yoshino Ropeway; Yoshino Town Community Bus: Smile Bus D Course

Construction
- Structure type: At grade
- Parking: None
- Cycle facilities: Available
- Accessible: Yes (1 accessible bathroom and equipped wheelchairs)

Other information
- Station code: F57
- Website: www.kintetsu.co.jp/station/station_info/en_station08020.html

History
- Opened: 25 March 1928; 98 years ago

Passengers
- 2019: 424
Services
Preceding station	Kintetsu Railway	Following station
F Yoshino Line
Yoshinojingū towards Ōsaka-Abenobashi, Furuichi or Muda	Local	Terminus
Yoshinojingū towards Ōsaka-Abenobashi	Semi-express	Terminus
Yoshinojingū towards Ōsaka-Abenobashi	Express	Terminus
Yoshinojingū towards Ōsaka-Abenobashi	Limited Express	Terminus
Yoshinojingū towards Ōsaka-Abenobashi	Sakura Liner	Terminus
Location
- Location within Nara Prefecture Location within Japan

Yoshino Station (吉野駅, Yoshino-eki) is a passenger railway station located in the town of Yoshino, Nara Prefecture, Japan. It is operated by the private transportation company, Kintetsu Railway.

== Lines ==
Yoshino Station is the southern terminus of the Yoshino Line and is 25.2 kilometers from the opposing terminus of the line at Kashiharajingū-mae and 64.0 kilometers from Ōsaka Abenobashi.

== Layout ==
The station is a ground-level station with has a comb-shaped bay platform with three sides and four tracks. The effective length of the platform is four cars. The station building is in the style of a Shinto shrine, and has been in use since the station opened.

=== Platforms ===
1~4	■ Yoshino Line	for Kashihara-Jingumae, Furuichi and Osaka Abenobashi

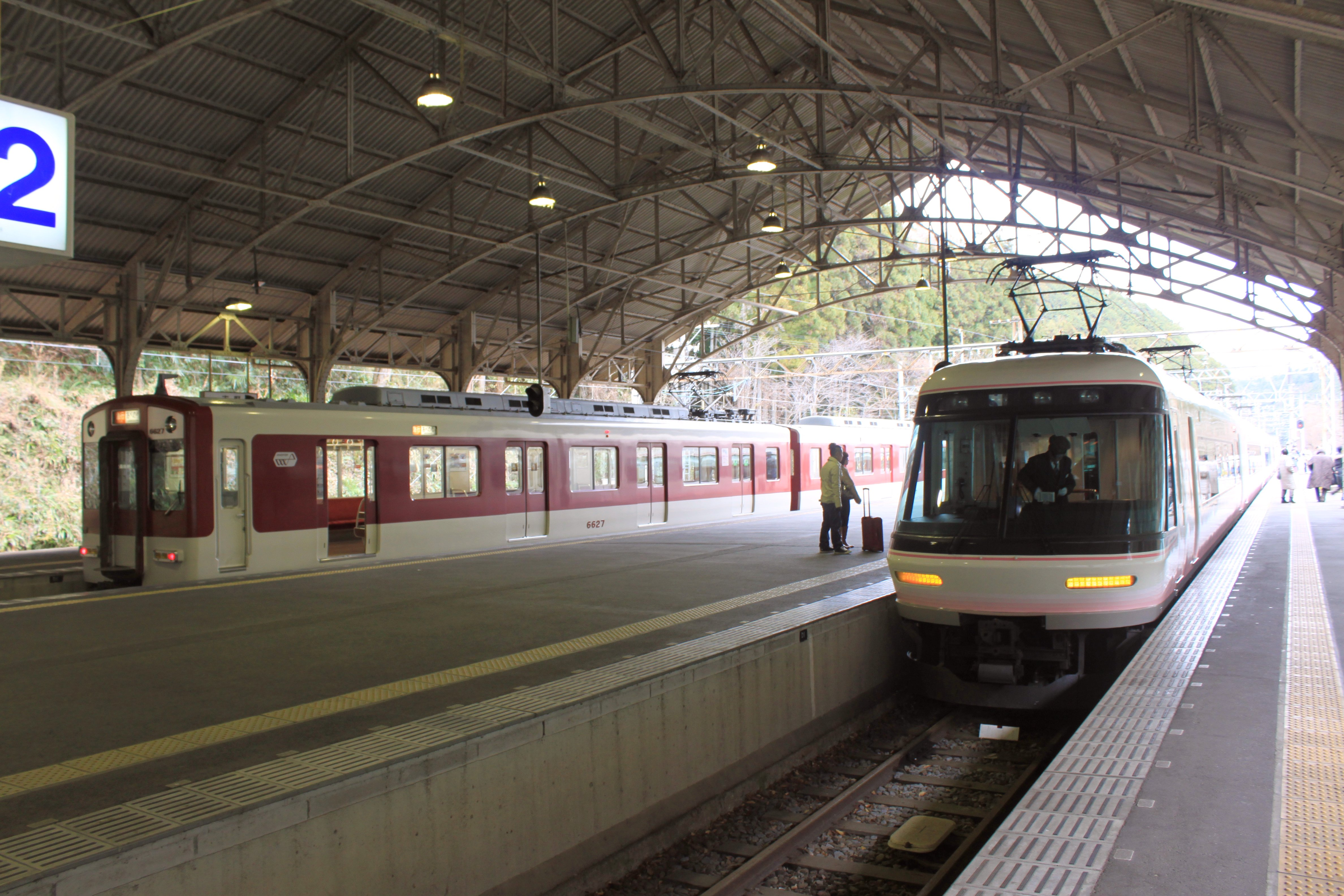
Platform

Platform layout

== History ==
Yoshino Station was opened on March 25, 1928, on the Yoshino Railway. On August 1, 1928, the line merged with the Osaka Electric Tramway, which was merged with the Sangu Express Railway on March 15, 1941, to become the Kansai Express Railway. The Kansai Express Railway merged with the Nankai Railway to form Kintetsu on June 1, 1944.

== Passenger statistics ==
In fiscal 2019, the station was used by an average of 424 passengers daily (boarding passengers only).

== Connections ==
- Yoshino Omine Cable's Yoshino Ropeway for Yoshinoyama Station
- Yoshino Town Community Bus (Smile Bus)

for Mount Yoshino

== Surrounding area ==
- Yoshino Ropeway to Mount Yoshino (operated by Yoshino Ohmine Ke-buru Ropeway Bus Co.)
- Kimpusen-ji
- Chikurin-in
- Yoshimizu Shrine
- Tomb of Emperor Godaigo
- Nyoirun-ji
- Sakuramotobo

== See also ==
- List of railway stations in Japan
