= Ōsaka Abenobashi Station =

Railway station in Osaka, Japan

Ōsaka Abenobashi Station 大阪阿部野橋駅
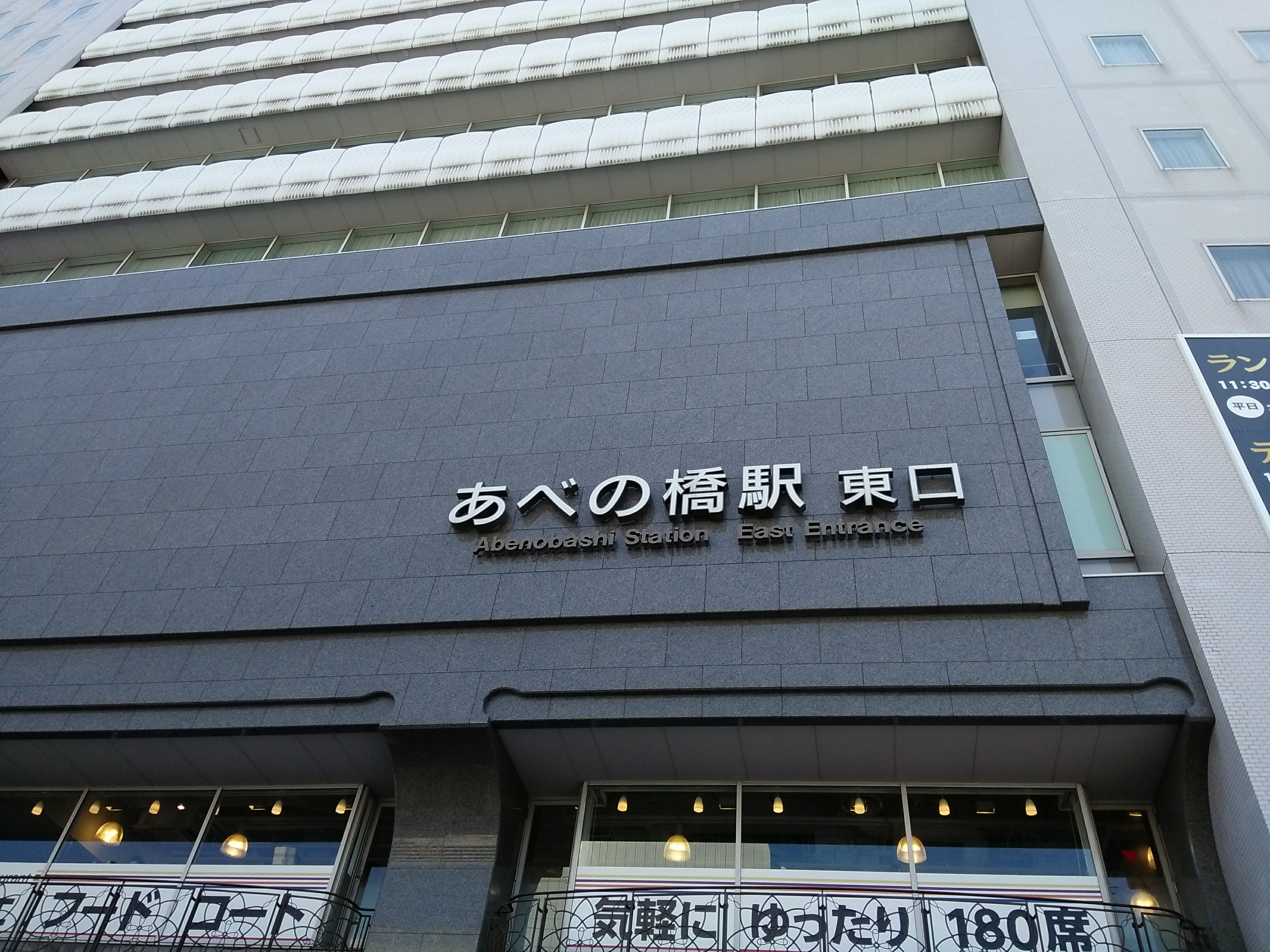
- Abenobashi station (April 16, 2017)

General information
- Location: 1, Abenosuji Itchome, Abeno, Osaka, Osaka （大阪市阿倍野区阿倍野筋1丁目1） Japan
- Coordinates: 34°38′44.29″N 135°30′50.06″E
- Operator: Kintetsu Railway
- Line: Minami Osaka Line
- Connections: Bus terminal

Other information
- Station code: F01

History
- Opened: 1923; 103 years ago
- Former names: Ōsaka Tennōji (until 1924)

Passengers
- November 13, 2012: 159,075 daily

Services
Preceding station	Kintetsu Railway	Following station
Terminus	Minami Osaka Line Local	Koboreguchi towards Kashiharajingū-mae
Terminus	Minami Osaka Line Semi-Express	Kawachi-Matsubara towards Kashiharajingū-mae
Terminus	Minami Osaka Line Suburban Express Express Limited Express (some trains)	Furuichi towards Kashiharajingū-mae
Terminus	Minami Osaka Line Limited Express	Shakudo towards Kashiharajingū-mae
Location

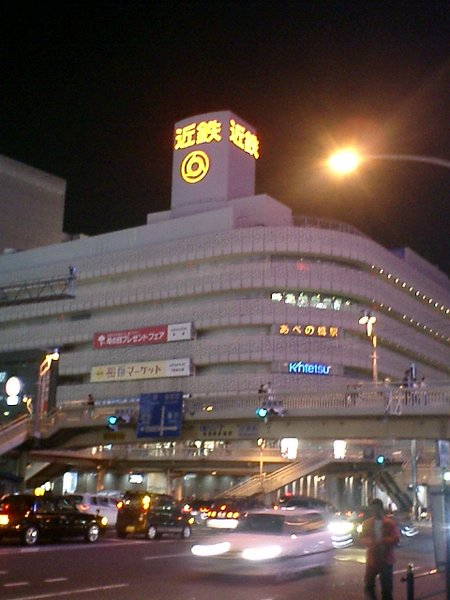
Osaka Abenobashi Station at night (April 2005)

Ōsaka Abenobashi Station (大阪阿部野橋駅, Ōsaka-Abenobashi-eki; station number: F01) is a railway station on Kintetsu Minami Osaka Line in Abeno-ku, Osaka, Japan. The station is also called "Abenobashi Station" (あべの橋駅).

According to the research on November 13, 2012, 159,075 passengers got on and off trains at Ōsaka Abenobashi Station. It was the largest number of passengers getting on and off trains at stations on the Kintetsu Lines.

The west ticket gates of the station were shifted 35m to the east on March 20, 2009, so that station facilities are entirely within the Kintetsu Abeno department store's "new" (east) building. The "old" (western) portion was demolished to make way for a new high-rise building.

== Connecting lines ==
- Tennoji Station
  - West Japan Railway Company (JR West)
  - Osaka Loop Line
  - Hanwa Line
  - Yamatoji Line
  - Osaka Metro
  - Midosuji Line (M23)
  - Tanimachi Line (T27)
- Tennoji-eki-mae Station
  - Hankai Tramway Uemachi Line

== Layout ==
The station has six bay platforms serving five tracks on the first floor.

Minami-Osaka Line for Fujiidera, Domyoji, Furuichi, Shakudo, Kashiharajingu-mae, Yoshino and Kawachi-Nagano

(1)	■ only for disembarking passengers	
1, 2	■ local trains	(6 a.m. - 11:59 p.m.)
(2, 3)	■ only for disembarking passengers	
3, 4	■ mainly semi-express trains and express trains	(also used for a suburban express train for Kashiharajingu-mae (to be a local train from there for Yoshino) on Saturdays, Sundays, and holidays) (also used for local trains (the first train - 5:59 a.m., from 0 a.m. - the last train))
(4)	■ for disembarking passengers	the opposite side of the second platform from the south
5	■ express trains and suburban express trains on weekday rush hours	(rarely used for semi-express trains) also for trains disembarking passengers at Track 6
6	■ limited express trains	also for trains disembarking passengers at Track 5

== Train services from 11 a.m. till 4 p.m. ==
Weekdays
1 limited express train to Yoshino
2 express trains to Yoshino
6 semi-express trains to Furuichi, of which 2 continue to Kashiharajingu-mae and other 4 to Kawachi-Nagano
6 local trains to Fujiidera, of which 1 or 2 continue to Furuichi
Weekends and holidays
2 limited express trains to Yoshino
2 express trains to Yoshino
6 semi-express trains to Furuichi, of which 2 continue to Kashiharajingu-mae and other 4 to Kawachi-Nagano
6 local trains to Fujiidera, of which 1 or 2 continue to Furuichi

== Establishments around the station ==
- Abenobashi Terminal Building (Abeno Harukas Tower Building, Abeno Harukas Wing Building, East Building)
  - Kintetsu Department Store Main Store Abeno Harukas
  - Offices
  - Osaka Marriott Miyako Hotel
  - Abeno Harukas Art Museum
  - Harukas 300
  - Miyako City Osaka Tennoji
- Hoop
- and
- Abeno Apollo Building, Abeno Lucias (Both are owned by Kin-ei Corp.)
- Tennoji MiO
  - Main Building
  - Plaza Building
- abeno CUES TOWN
- Tennoji Park
  - Tennoji Zoo
  - Osaka Municipal Museum of Art
- Shitennō-ji

The skyscraper "Abeno Harukas" opened on March 7, 2014. The department store floors pre-opened on June 13, 2013, and February 22, 2014.

=== Bus stops ===
==== Transit buses ====
Osaka City Bus, Osaka Metro
Stop number	Location	Destinations
1	north side of JR West Tennōji Station	Route 12 for Fuse Station via Tennoji Todaimon-mae and Ōikebashi; Route 22 for Suwa Jinja-mae via Teradacho, Tennoji Kumin Center and Uehommachi Rokuchome
2	north side of JR West Tennōji Station	Route 13 for Kita-Tatsumi Bus Terminal via Shariji; Route 30 for Hirano Kuyakusho-mae (Hirano Ward Office) via Teradacho, Kumata and Subway Minami-Tatsumi
3	east side of Tennoji park, along Tanimachisuji Avenue	Route 62 for Osaka Station via Uehommachi Rokuchōme and Temmabashi; Route 62A, 62B for Uehommachi Rokuchōme-minami
4	east side of Abeno Q's Mall, along Abenosuji Avenue	Route 62 for Osaka Station via Uehommachi Rokuchōme and Temmabashi; Route 62A, 62B for Uehommachi Rokuchōme-minami
5	west side of Tennoji MiO Plaza, along Tanimachisuji Avenue	Route 63 for Asaka; Route 64 for Orionobashi
6	west side of Tennoji MiO Plaza, along Tanimachisuji Avenue	Route 62, Route 67 for Sumiyoshi Depot
7	south side of JR West Tennōji Station East Entrance (eastbound)	Route 6 for Sunjiyata via Bishōen, Kumata and Imagawa Hatchōme; Osaka Metro BRT2 for Kamiji-koen via Kumata, Oikebashi and Subway Imazato
8	south side of JR West Tennōji Station East Entrance (eastbound)	Route 1 for Deto Bus Terminal; Route 5 for Miyake-naka via Naka-Kuwazu, Kumata and Hirano kuyakusho-mae (Hirano Ward Office)
9	north side of Abeno Harukas	Route 48 for Subway Suminoekoen via Bainan Sanchōme; Route 52 for Namba via Tsurumibashi Shōtengai
10	north side of Abeno Harukas	*Route 80 for Tsurumachi Yonchōme

Amenobashi-nishi Bus Stop located in front of Apollo Building is available for bus routes 48, 52 and 80.

Abeno Uehommachi Shuttle Buses (Kintetsu Bus Co., Ltd.)
Stop name	Location	Destinations
Abenobashi	north side of Abeno Harukas	Route 10 for Osaka Uehommachi via Shitenno-ji Sandoguchi
Abenobashi-higashiguchi	entrance to Miyako City Osaka Tennoji	Route 12 for Osaka Uehommachi via Shitenno-ji Sandoguchi (from 7:50 p.m. buses till the last one)

==== Expressway buses ====
Kintetsu Bus Co., Ltd. and others
Stop name	Location	Destinations
Abenobashi Bus Station	north side of Abeno Harukas)	"the Seagull" for Hitachi, Iwaki Station and Namie Station; "the Galaxy" for Koriyama Station and Fukushima Station; "the Flying Liner" for Yokohama Station west gate, Tokyo Station Yaesu Dori and Shinonome; "the Flying Sneakers Osaka" for Tokyo Station Yaesu Dori and Shinonome (inexpensive); "the Twinkle" for Keio Hachioji Station and Shinjuku Expressway Bus Terminal; "the Casual Twinkle" for Shinjuku Expressway Bus Terminal (inexpensive); "the Crystal Liner" for Kofu Station; "the Fujiyama Liner" for Higashi-Shizuoka Station, Fuji Station, Fujikyu Highland and Mt. Fuji Station; "the Chikumagawa Liner" for Ueda Station and Karuizawa Station; for Kobe-Sanda Premium Outlets; "the Shimanto Blue Liner" for Nakamura Station and Sukumo Station; "the Karst" for Yamaguchi and Hagi; "the Sunrise" for Kumamoto; "the Aso-Kuma" for Kumamoto (inexpensive); "the Netherlands Park" for Nagasaki; "the Sorin" for Oita
West JR Bus Company, JR Bus Kanto Co., Ltd.
Stop name	Location	Destinations
Tennoji Station	east side of Tennoji Park	"the Dream" for Shinjuku Station, Tokyo Station Yaesu gate and Tokyo Disneyland; "the Youth Eco Dream" for Tokyo Station Yaesu gate and Shin-Kiba Station
Osaka Bus Co., Ltd., Tokyo Bus Co., Ltd.
Stop name	Location	Destinations
Tennoji Station	east side of Bikkuri Donkey	"the Nagoya New Star" for Nagoya Station; "the Tokyo New Star" for Tokyo Station, Akihabara Station, and Oji Station

==== Airport limousine ====
Stop name	Location	Companies
Abeno Harukas	north of Abeno Harukas	Kintetsu Bus Co., Ltd., Kansai Airport Transportation Enterprise Co., Ltd. Abenobashi Route for Kansai International Airport
Abenobashi (Tennoji)	(north side of Apollo Building)	Osaka Airport Transport Co., Ltd. for Osaka International Airport
