= PL Art of Fireworks =

PL Art of Fireworks 教祖祭PL花火芸術
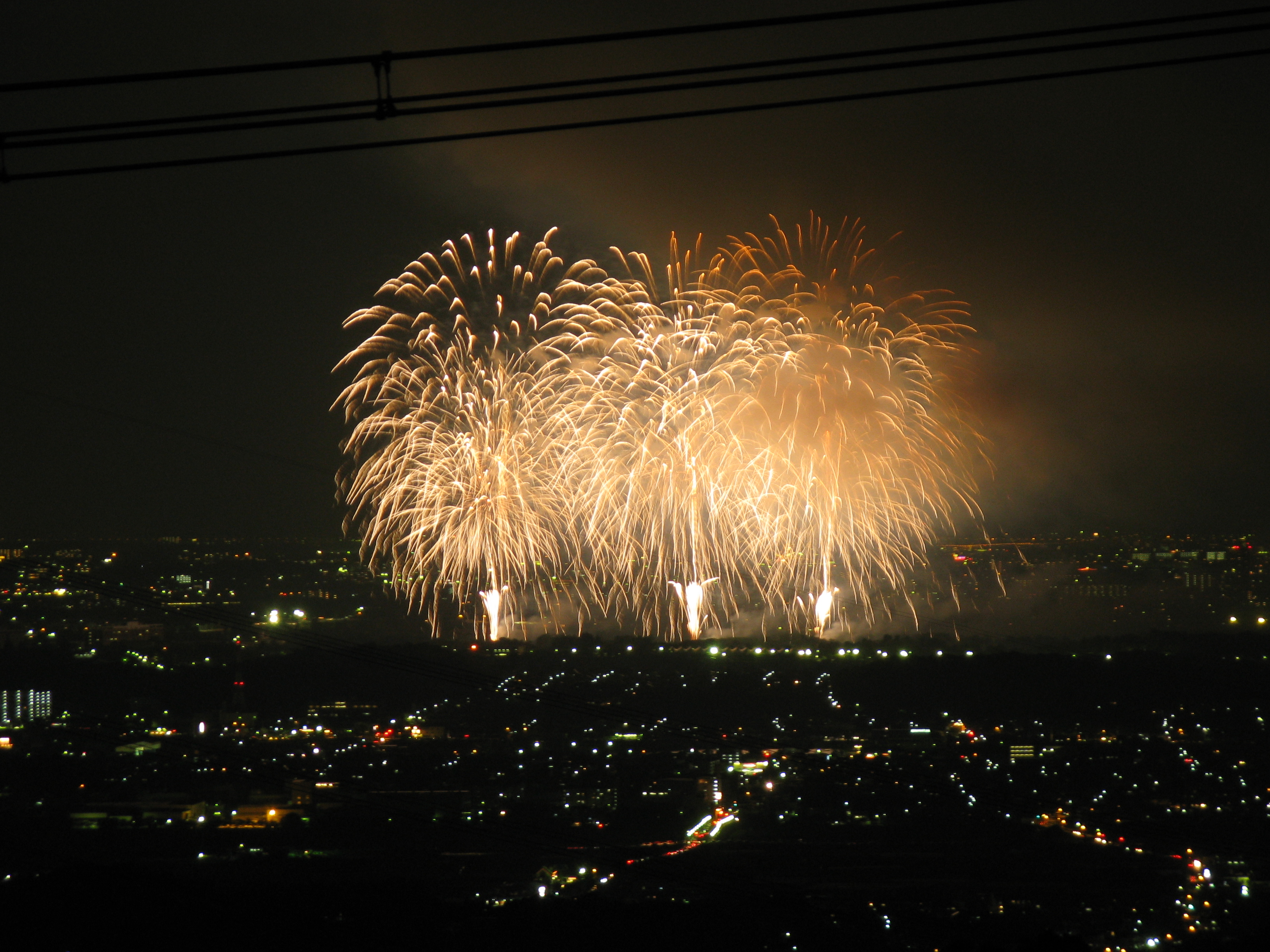
- Seen from Mount Nijō in 2010
- Genre: Religious event
- Date: August 1
- Begins: 1953
- Frequency: Annually
- Locations: Tondabayashi, Osaka, Japan
- Attendance: 250,000 to 300,000
- Organiser: Church of Perfect Liberty
- Website: Official web site

PL Art of Fireworks (教祖祭PL花火芸術, Kyōsosai PL hanabi geijutsu) is a religious event of the Church of Perfect Liberty held on August 1 every year in Tondabayashi, Osaka Prefecture, Japan. It is recognized as one of the biggest fireworks festivals in the world.

== Overview ==
- This event honors the first and second founders.
- It is established as a summer tradition in Kansai region.
- The fireworks can be seen not only in Tondabayashi but also in neighboring cities such as Ōsakasayama, Kawachinagano Sakai and Habikino. Above all, the gigantic Star Mine set off at the finale sounds like rumbling of the earth and lights up the whole neighborhood as bright as day for a few seconds.

== History ==
- 1953 - Held for the first time in Matsuyama, Ehime Prefecture.
- 1954 - Held in the present location.
- 1963 - Officially named as the PL Art of Fireworks.

== Influences ==
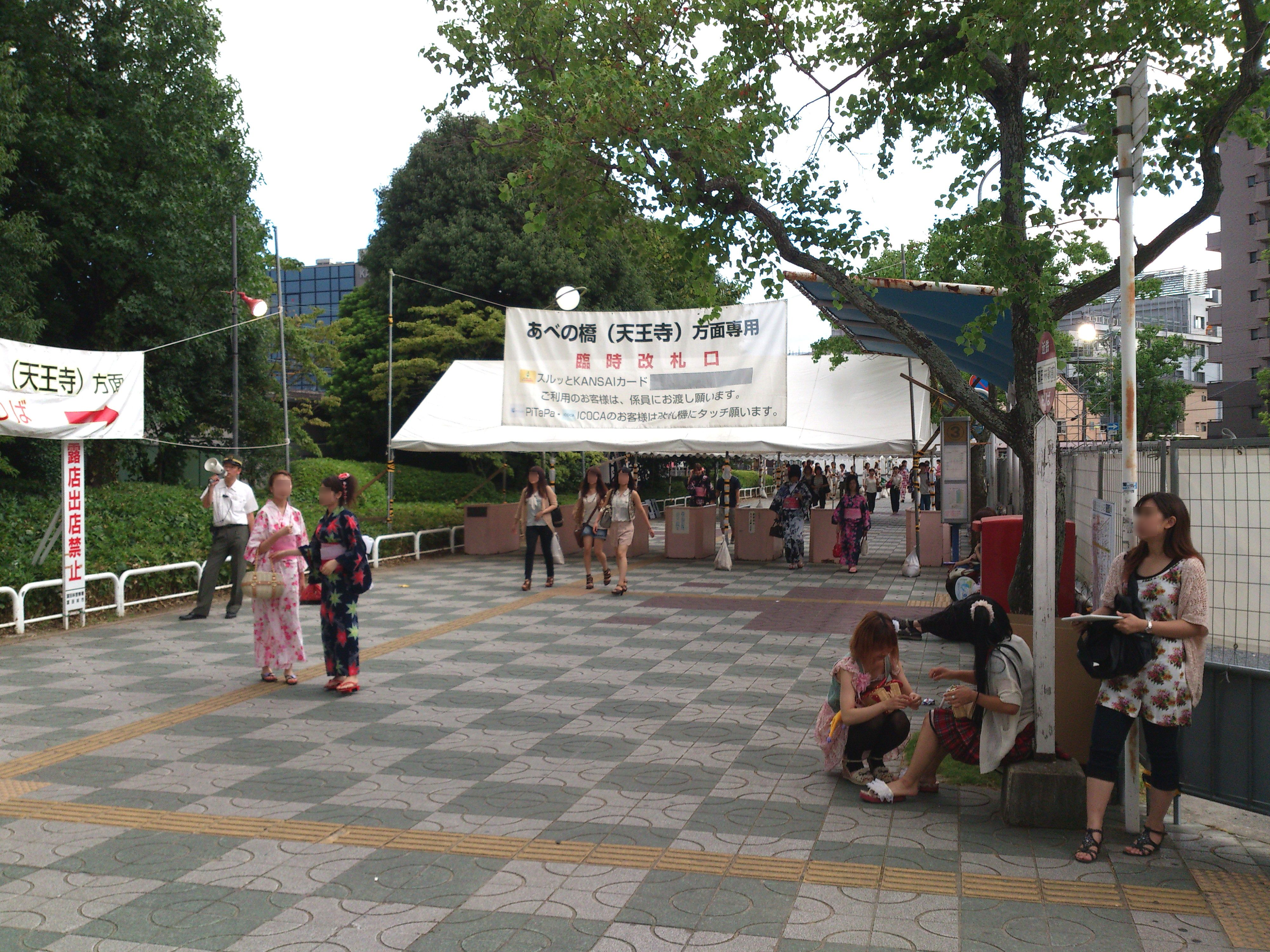
Extra ticket gates of Tondabayashi Station in 2012

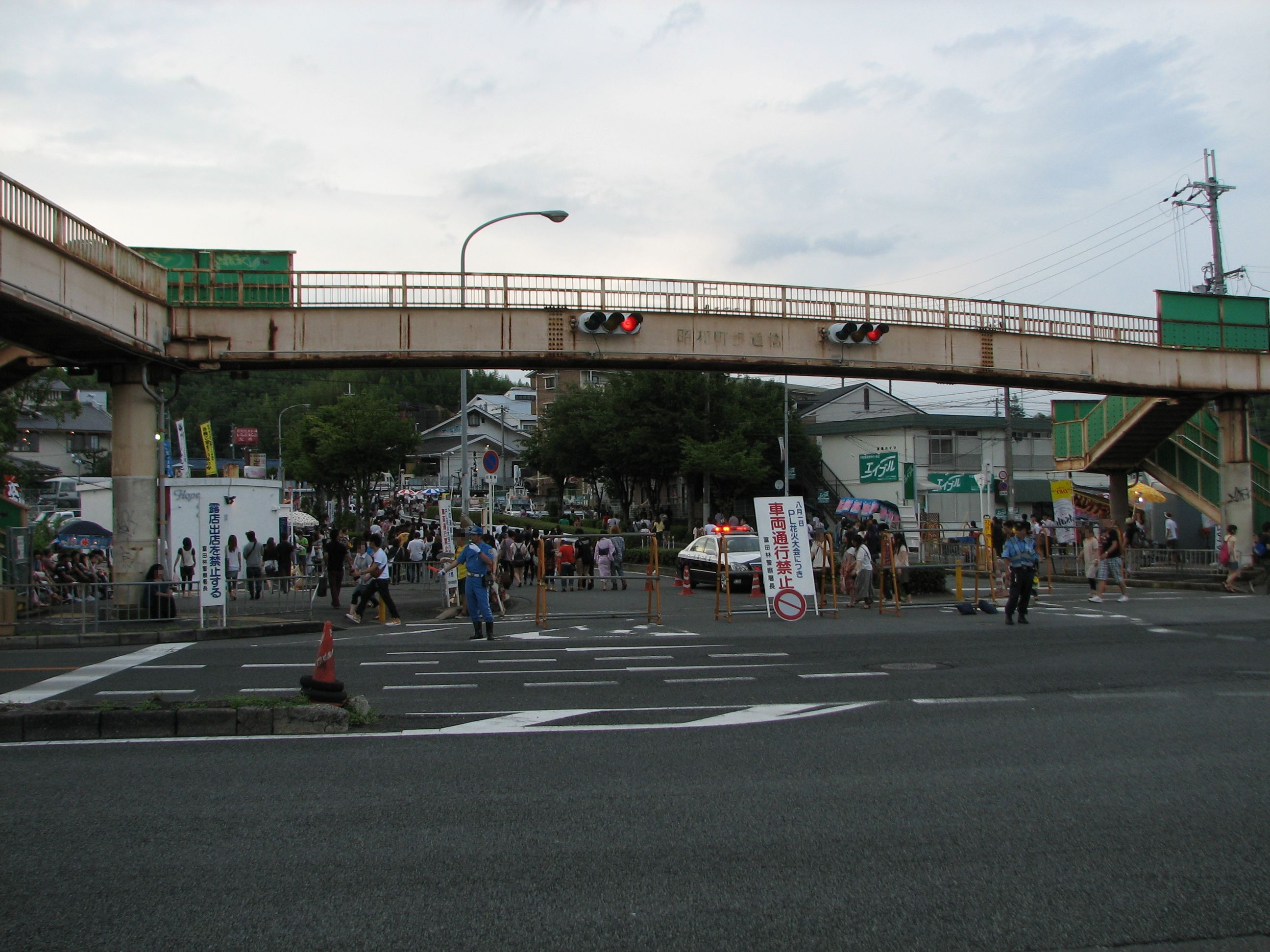
Road traffic control in 2009

This festival is so huge and popular that it affects the traffic and public transportation in the neighboring areas.

=== Rail and bus ===
- Kintetsu Minami Osaka Line, Nagano Line and so on run to the special timetable from the afternoon to the last train.
- The north gate of Tondabayashi Station becomes the only ticket gate available for Furuichi and Ōsaka Abenobashi from 8:35 pm to the last train, and the south gate of the station becomes the only ticket gate available for Kawachinagano at the same time.
- Kintetsu Bus which leaves the north gate of Tondabayashi Station stops running from 3:00 pm to the last bus.
- Nankai Kōya Line also runs a few special trains bound for Namba in addition to the normal timetable after fireworks.

=== Road ===
- The pedestrian bridges near the grounds are closed from 1:00 pm on the day to 7:00 am on the next day.
- Part of Osaka Prefectural Route 35 and Osaka Prefectural Route 203 become a pedestrian zone from 4:00 pm to 11:00 pm.
- National Route 170 between Midorigaoka Intersection and Tomigaoka-minami Intersection also become a pedestrian zone from 7:00 pm to 11:00 pm.
- Beginning pedestrian zones, the roads around the ground are jammed.

=== Stores ===
- Restaurants, supermarkets and convenience stores open as usual. However, electric stores, gas stations and car dealerships close early or close all day.

== See also ==
- PL Kyodan
