= Takidanifudō Station =

Railway station in Tondabayashi, Osaka Prefecture, Japan

Takidanifudō Station 滝谷不動駅
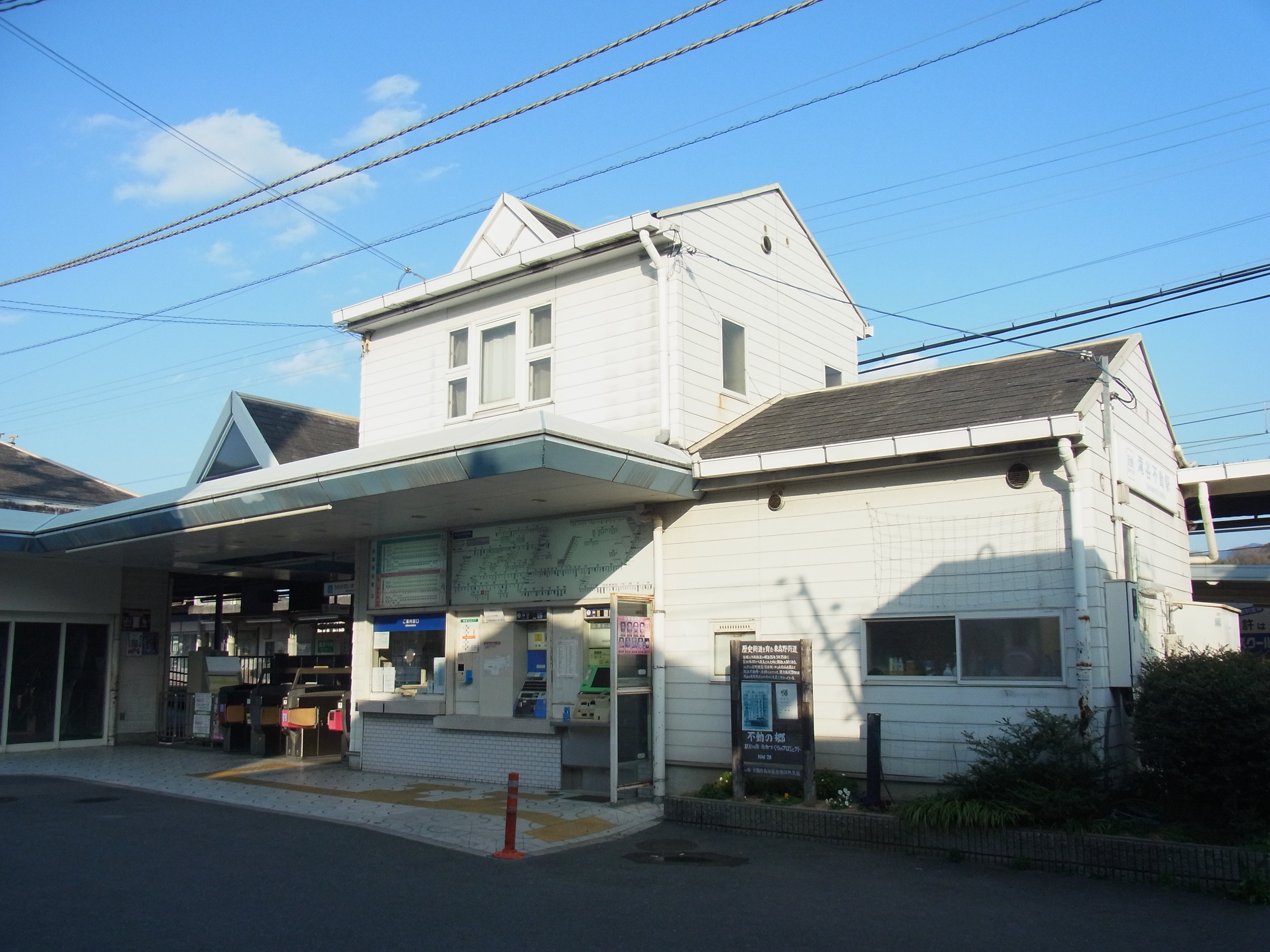
- Takidanifudō Station, March 2012

General information
- Location: 15-1, Nishikiori-higashi 2-chōme, Tondabayashi-shi, Osaka-fu 584-0069; Japan
- Coordinates: 34°28′51.6″N 135°35′11.0″E
- Operator: Kintetsu Railway
- Line: Nagano Line
- Distance: 8.7 km (5.4 miles) from Furuichi
- Platforms: 2 side platforms
- Connections

Other information
- Station code: O21
- Website: Official website

History
- Opened: 25 March 1902

Passengers
- FY2018: 6914 daily
Location
- Location within Osaka Prefecture Location within Japan

Takidanifudō Station (滝谷不動駅, Takidanifudō-eki) is a passenger railway station in the city of Tondabayashi, Osaka Prefecture, Japan, operated by the private railway company Kintetsu Railway.

== Lines ==
Takidanifudō Station is served by the Kintetsu Nagano Line, and is located 8.7 kilometers from the terminus of the line at Furuichi and 27.0 kilometers from Ōsaka Abenobashi.

== Station layout ==
The station consists of two opposed side platforms connected to the station building by a level crossing.

=== Platforms ===
1	■ Nagano Line	for Kawachi-Nagano
2	■ Nagano Line	for Furuichi and Ōsaka Abenobashi

== Adjacent stations ==
«	Service	»
Kintetsu Nagano Line
Kawanishi	Local	Shionomiya
Kawanishi	Semi-Express	Shionomiya
Kawanishi	Express (Kawachinagano-bound only)	Shionomiya

== History ==
Takidanifudō Station opened on March 25,1902.

== Passenger statistics ==
In fiscal 2018, the station was used by an average of 6914 passengers daily

== Surrounding area ==
- Takidani Fudo Myo-ji Temple
- Osaka Ohtani University
- Hatsushiba Tondabayashi Junior and Senior High School
- Tondabayashi Municipal Nishiki-gun Elementary School

== See also ==
- List of railway stations in Japan
