= Okameishi Kofun =

- お亀石古墳 (Japanese)
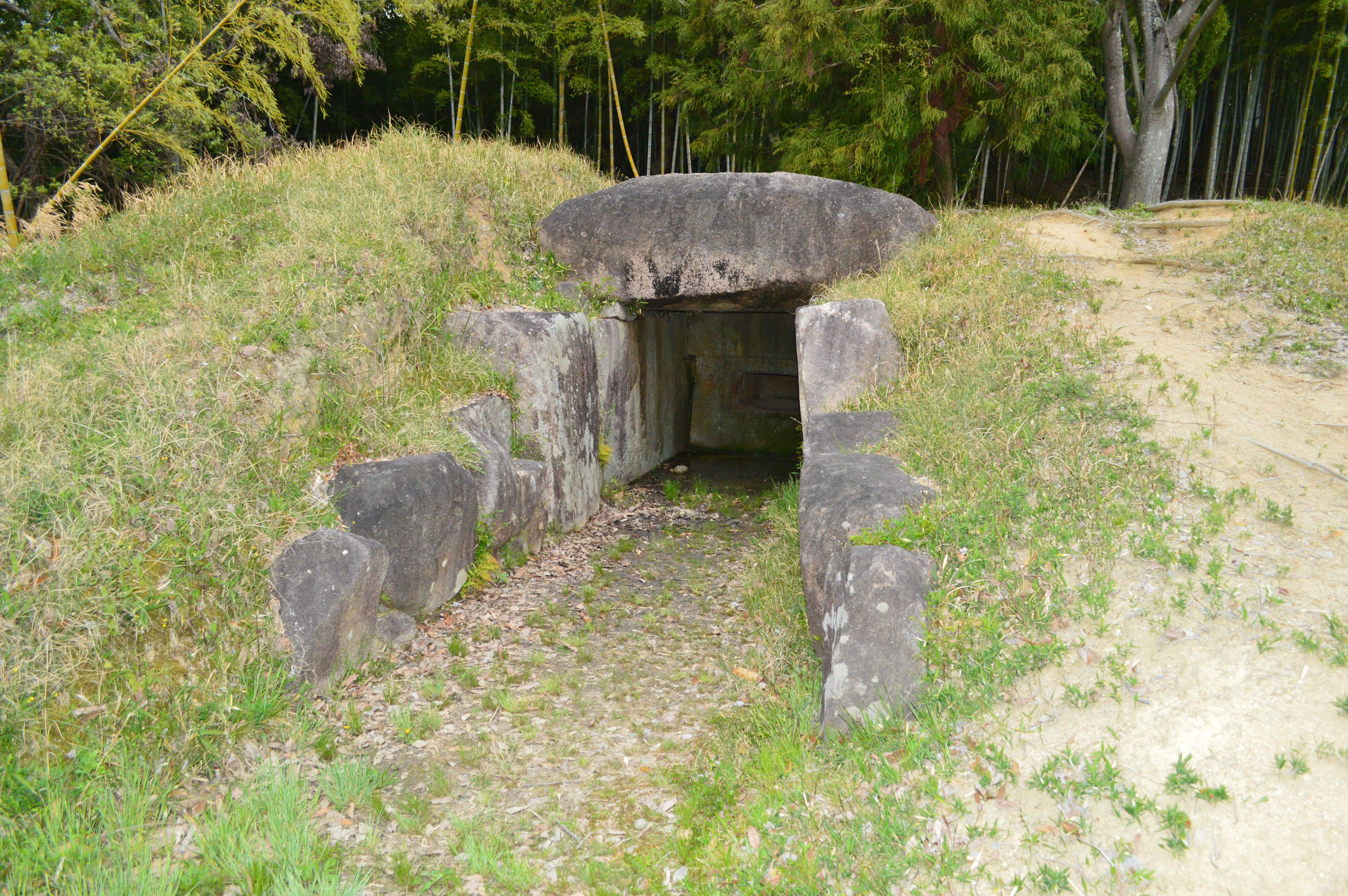
- Okameishi Kofun

- Okameishi Kofun Okameishi Kofun (Japan)
- Interactive map of Okameishi Kofun
- 34°30′44.091″N 135°35′55.170″E
- Type: Kofun
- Periods: Kofun period
- Location: Tondabayashi, Osaka, Japan
- Region: Kansai region

History
- Built: c.early 7th century

Site notes
- Public access: Yes

The Okameishi Kofun (お亀石古墳) is a Kofun period square-shaped burial mound, located in the Nakano neighborhood of the city of Tondabayashi, Osaka in the Kansai region of Japan. The tumulus was designated a National Historic Site of Japan in 2002 collectively with the nearby Shindō temple ruins and the Oganji-ike tile kiln ruins.

== Overview ==
The Okameishi Kofun is a hōfun (方墳)-style tumulus with 21-meter square sides. It is located on a ridge that protrudes southeast from the Habino Hills at an elevation of 98 meters. No fukiishi have been found at the site.The tumulus is orientated to the south and has a horizontal grantite-lined burial chamber containing a house-shaped sarcophagus.The sarcophagus is made of white tuff from Mount Nijō and has a stone lid with six protrusions for hanging by ropes. As the lid has been exposed for a long time it has weathered and resembles the shape of a turtle, hence the name "Kameishi". An archaeological excavation in 2002 revealed that the entourage was originally closed with a river stone. Burial goods included shards of Sue ware pottery, which date the tumulus to the first half of the 7th century. An unusual feature is that many flat roof tiles from the Asuka period are stacked up around the sarcophagus forming a retaining wall. The tiles are the same type as the Baekje-style roof tiles used at the Shindō temple ruins located to the southeast, and may indicate that the person buried in this time had some close relationship with that temple.

The tumulus is about a 15-minute walk from Tondabayashi Station on the Kintetsu Nagano Line.

== Gallery ==
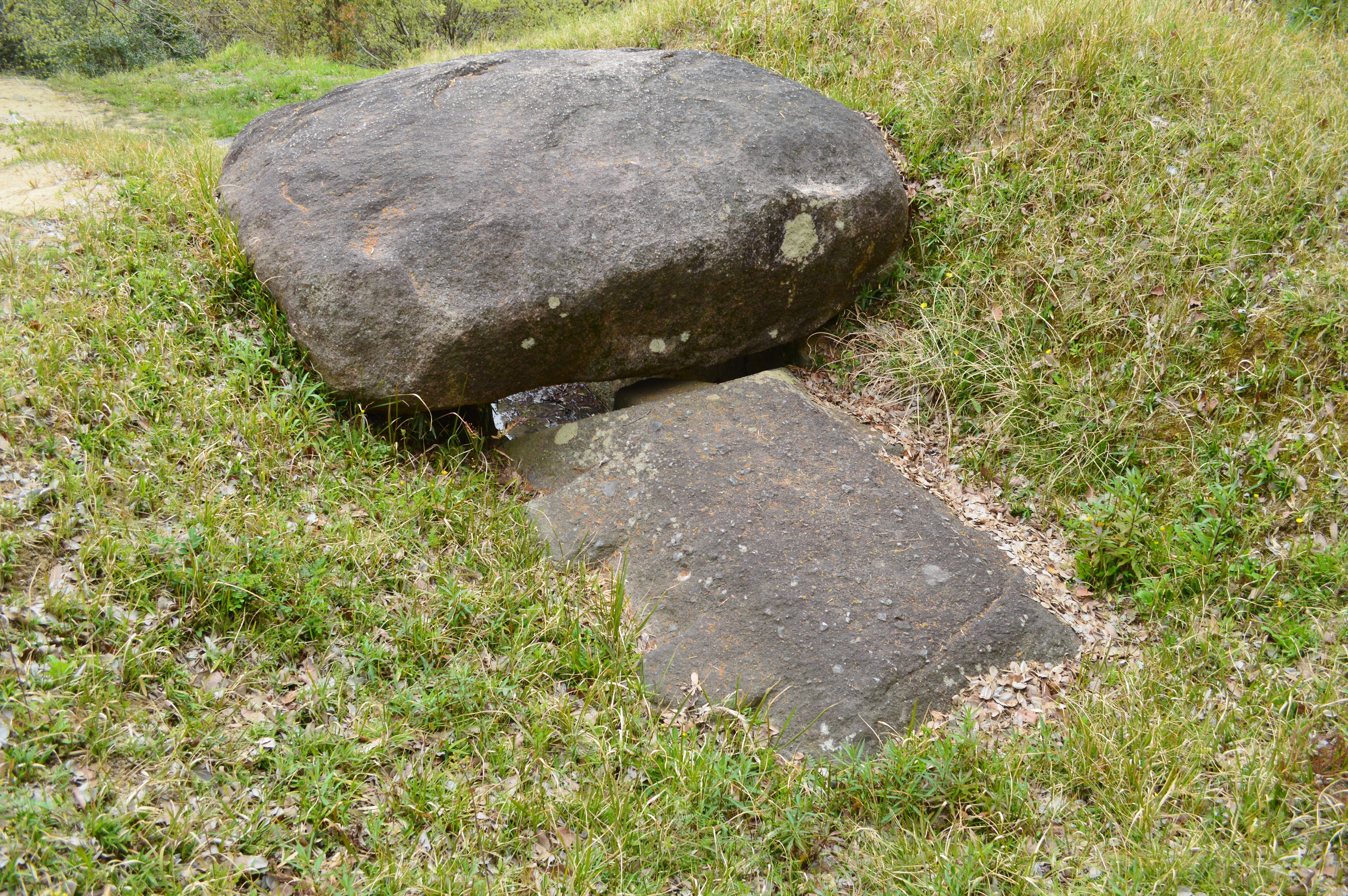
Stone sarcophagus

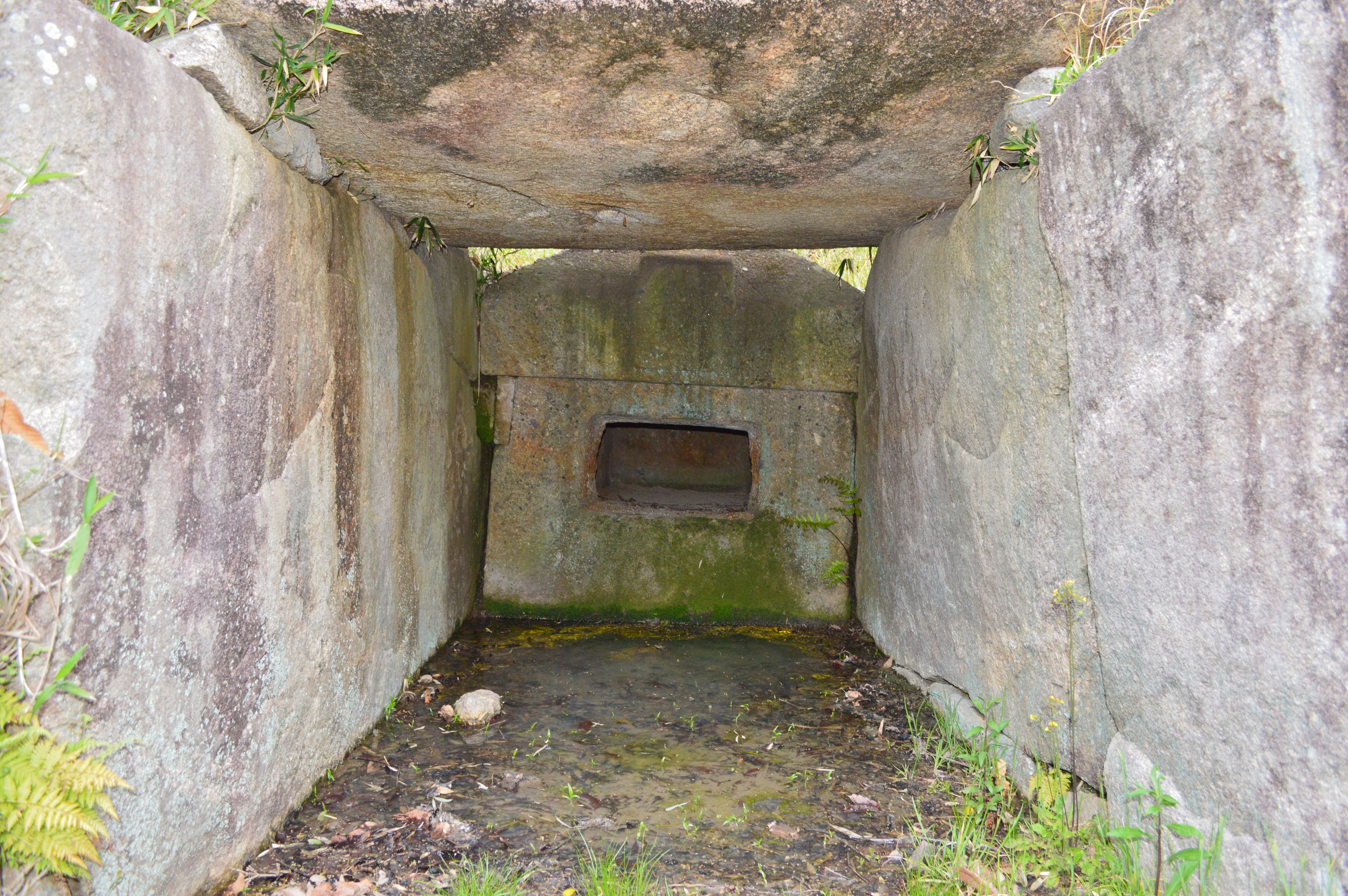
Entrourage looking towards burial chamber

== See also ==
- List of Historic Sites of Japan (Osaka)
