= Tondabayashi-nishiguchi Station =

Railway station in Tondabayashi, Osaka Prefecture, Japan

Tondabayashi-nishiguchi Station 富田林西口駅
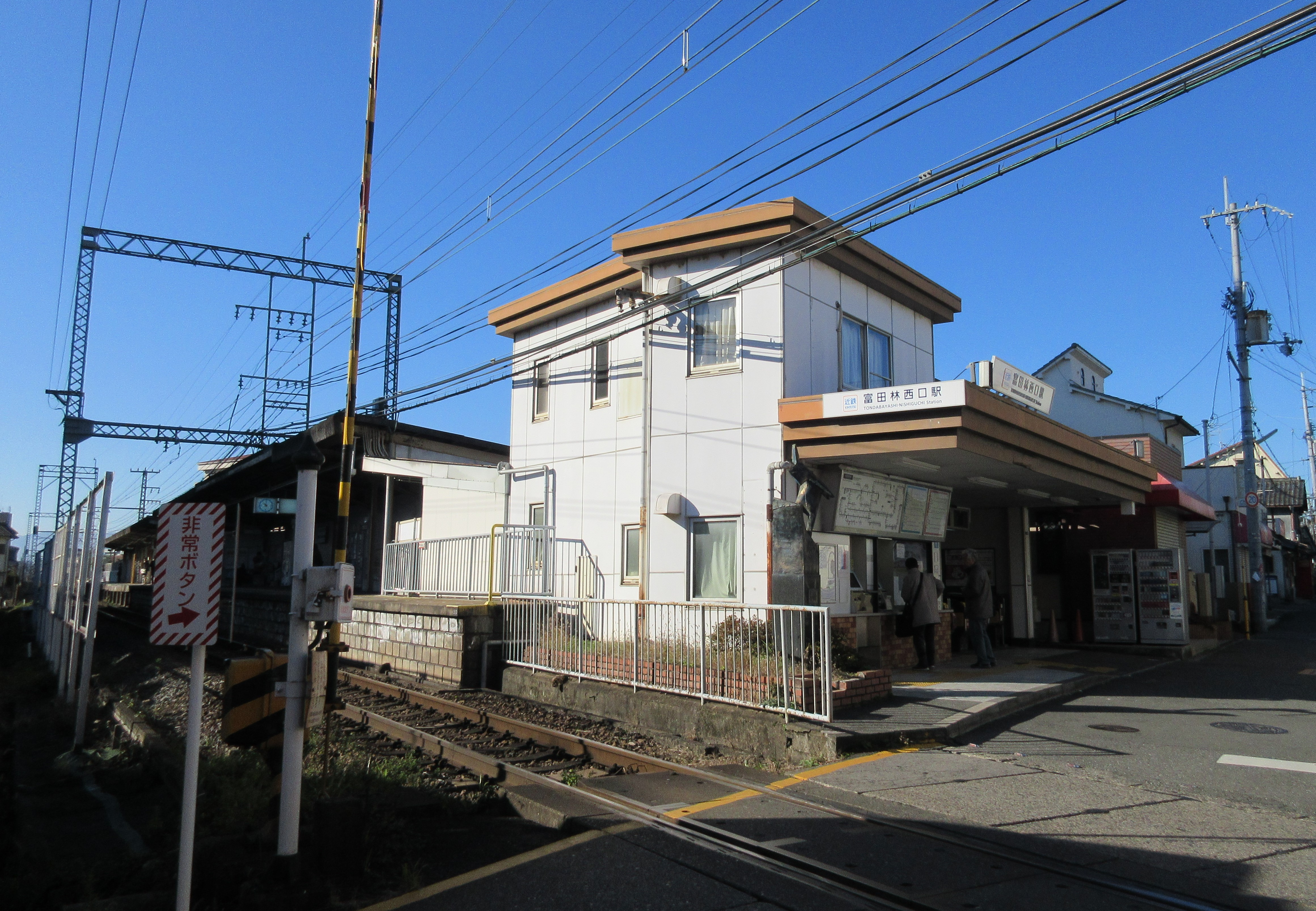
- Tondabayashi-nishiguchi Station, December 2015

General information
- Location: 1-34, Kotobukichō 1-chōme, Tondabayashi-shi, Osaka-fu 584-0032; Japan
- Coordinates: 34°30′2.8″N 135°35′47.6″E
- Operator: Kintetsu Railway
- Line: Nagano Line
- Distance: 6.3 km (3.9 miles) from Furuichi
- Platforms: 1 side platform
- Connections

Other information
- Station code: O19
- Website: Official website

History
- Opened: 12 October 1904
- Former names: Gakkōmae (until 1933)

Passengers
- FY2018: 6537 daily
Location
- Location within Osaka Prefecture Location within Japan

Tondabayashi-nishiguchi Station (富田林西口駅, Tondabayashi-nishiguchi-eki) is a passenger railway station in the city of Tondabayashi, Osaka Prefecture, Japan, operated by the private railway company Kintetsu Railway.

== Lines ==
Tondabayashi-nishiguchi Station is served by the Kintetsu Nagano Line, and is located 6.3 kilometers from the terminus of the line at Furuichi and 24.6 kilometers from Ōsaka Abenobashi.

== Station layout ==
The station consists of a single side platform serving one ground-level bi-directional track.Ticket gates are located at the north end of the platform.

=== Platforms ===
■ Nagano Line	for Kawachinagano for Furuichi and Ōsaka Abenobashi

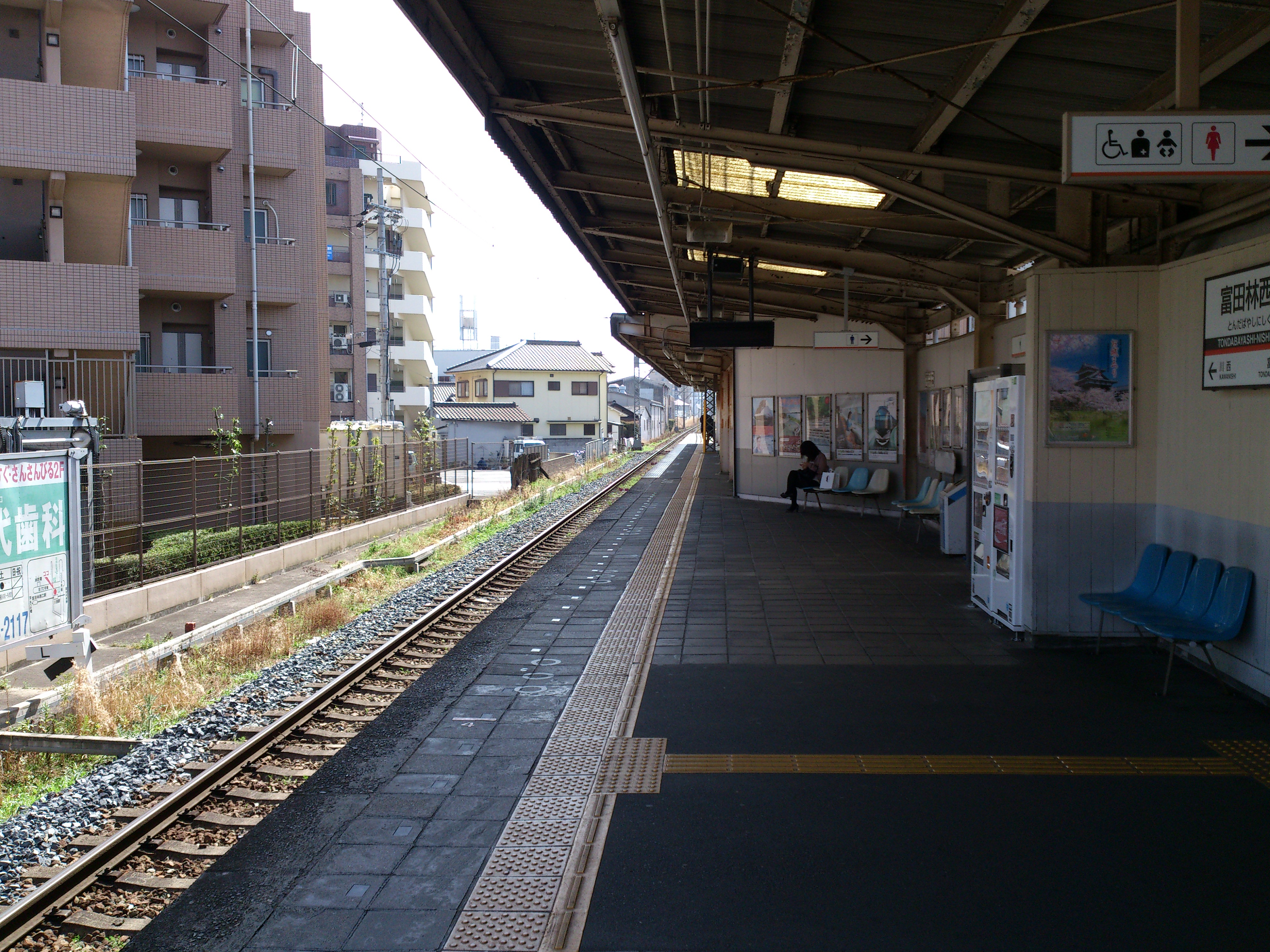
Platform

== Adjacent stations ==
«	Service	»
Kintetsu Nagano Line
Tondabayashi	Local	Kawanishi
Tondabayashi	Semi-Express	Kawanishi
Tondabayashi	Express (Kawachinagano-bound only)	Kawanishi

== History ==
Tondabayashi-nishiguchi Station opened on October 12, 1904 as Gakkōmae Station (学校前駅). The station was closedown March 31, 1912 and reopened on January 9, 1917. It was renamed to its present name on March 8, 1933. It was closed again from June 1, 1945 to July 1, 1946.

== Passenger statistics ==
In fiscal 2018, the station was used by an average of 6537 passengers daily

== Surrounding area ==
- Tondabayashi City Hall
- Tondabayashi Police Station
- Tondabayashi Post Office
- Tondabayashi-nishiguchi Post Office
- Tondabayashi Junior & Senior High School
- Kanan High School (Osaka Prefecture)

== See also ==
- List of railway stations in Japan
