= Kishi Station (Osaka) =

Railway station in Tondabayashi, Osaka Prefecture, Japan

Kishi Station 喜志駅
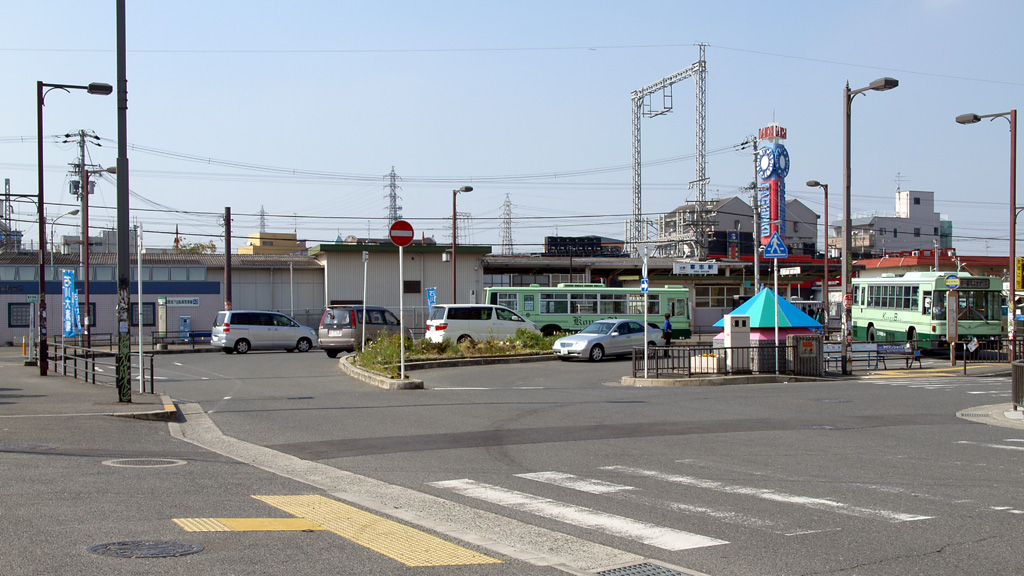
- Kishi Station

General information
- Location: 4-32, Kishi-chō 3-chōme, Tondabayashi-shi, Osaka-fu 584-0005; Japan
- Coordinates: 34°31′22.2″N 135°36′25.9″E
- Operator: Kintetsu Railway
- Line: Nagano Line
- Distance: 3.4 km (2.1 miles) from Furuichi
- Platforms: 2 side platforms
- Connections: Bus terminal

Other information
- Station code: O17
- Website: Official website

History
- Opened: 14 April 1898
- Former names: Taishiguchi-Kishi (until 1933)

Passengers
- FY2018: 17,226 daily
Location
- Location within Osaka Prefecture Location within Japan

Kishi Station (喜志駅, Kishi-eki) is a passenger railway station in the city of Tondabayashi, Osaka Prefecture, Japan, operated by the private railway company Kintetsu Railway.

== Lines ==
Kishi Station is served by the Kintetsu Nagano Line, and is located 3.4 kilometers from the terminus of the line at Furuichi and 21.7 kilometers from Ōsaka Abenobashi.

== Station layout ==
The station consists of two opposed side platforms connected to the station building by an underground passage.

=== Platforms ===
1	■ Nagano Line	for Kawachi-Nagano
2	■ Nagano Line	for Furuichi and Osaka Abenobashi

== Adjacent stations ==
«	Service	»
Kintetsu Nagano Line
Furuichi	Local	Tondabayashi
Furuichi	Semi-Express	Tondabayashi
Furuichi	Express	Tondabayashi

== History ==
Kishi Station opened on April 14, 1898. It was renamed Taishiguchi Station (太子口駅) on January 1, 1919, and then Taishiguchi-Kishi Station (太子口喜志駅) three weeks late on January 25 of the same year. It reverted to Kishi Station on April 1, 1933.

== Passenger statistics ==
In fiscal 2018, the station was used by an average of 17,226 passengers daily

== Surrounding area ==
- Eifuku-ji Temple
- Tsuho-ji Temple
- Kishi Elementary School, Tondabayashi City
- Kishinishi Elementary School, Tondabayashi City
- Tondabayashi Municipal Kishi Junior High School
- PL Gakuen Junior and Senior High School

== See also ==
- List of railway stations in Japan
