= Nagano Line =

Nagano Line may refer to either of the following railway lines in Japan:

- Nagano Line, a railway line in Nagano Prefecture, owned and operated by the Nagano Electric Railway
- Nagano Line (Kintetsu), a railway line in Osaka Prefecture, connecting Habikino and Kawachinagano
