= Kawanishi Station (Osaka) =

Railway station in Tondabayashi, Osaka Prefecture, Japan

Kawanishi Station 川西駅
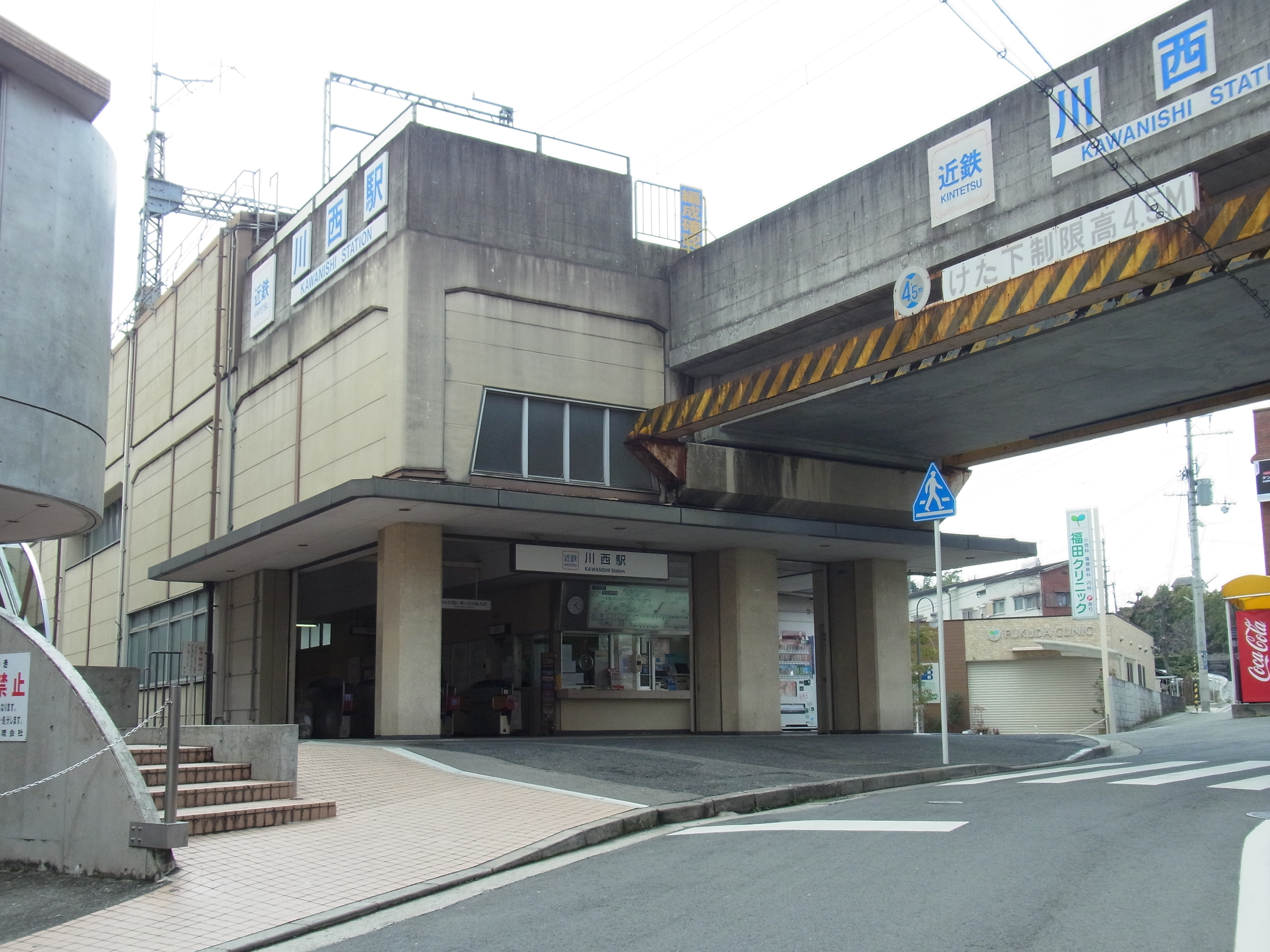
- Kawanishi Station, March 2012

General information
- Location: 2-29, Kōda 3-chōme, Tondabayashi-shi, Osaka-fu 584-0036; Japan
- Coordinates: 34°29′32.4″N 135°35′27.6″E
- Operator: Kintetsu Railway
- Line: Nagano Line
- Distance: 7.3 km (4.5 miles) from Furuichi
- Platforms: 1 side platform
- Connections

Other information
- Station code: O20
- Website: Official website

History
- Opened: 20 August 1911
- Former names: Tsuzuyama (1920 - 1933)

Passengers
- FY2018: 3830 daily
Location
- Location within Osaka Prefecture Location within Japan

Kawanishi Station (川西駅, Kawanishi-eki) is a passenger railway station in the city of Tondabayashi, Osaka Prefecture, Japan, operated by the private railway company Kintetsu Railway.

== Lines ==
Kawanishi Station is served by the Kintetsu Nagano Line, and is located 7.3 kilometers from the terminus of the line at Furuichi and 25.6 kilometers from Ōsaka Abenobashi.

== Station layout ==
The station consists of one elevated side platform with the station building underneath.

=== Platforms ===
| 1 | ■ Kintetsu Nagano Line | for Ōsaka Abenobashi for Kawachi-Nagano |

== Adjacent stations ==
| « | Service | » |
Kintetsu Nagano Line
| Tondabayashi-nishiguchi | Local | Takidanifudō |
| Tondabayashi-nishiguchi | Semi-Express | Takidanifudō |
| Tondabayashi-nishiguchi | Express (Kawachinagano-bound only) | Takidanifudō |

== History ==
Kawanishi Station opened on August 15, 1911. It was closed on April 16, 1920 and reopened on September 11, 1920 as Tsuzuyama Station (廿山駅). It reverted to "Kawanishi Station" on April 1, 1933.

== Passenger statistics ==
In fiscal 2018, the station was used by an average of 3830 passengers daily

== Surrounding area ==
- Tondabayashi Municipal General Welfare Hall
- Nishikiori Shrine
- Kawanishi Elementary School, Tondabayashi City
- Tondabayashi City Koganedai Elementary School

== See also ==
- List of railway stations in Japan
