= Shionomiya Station =

Railway station in Kawachinagano, Japan

Shionomiya Station 汐ノ宮駅
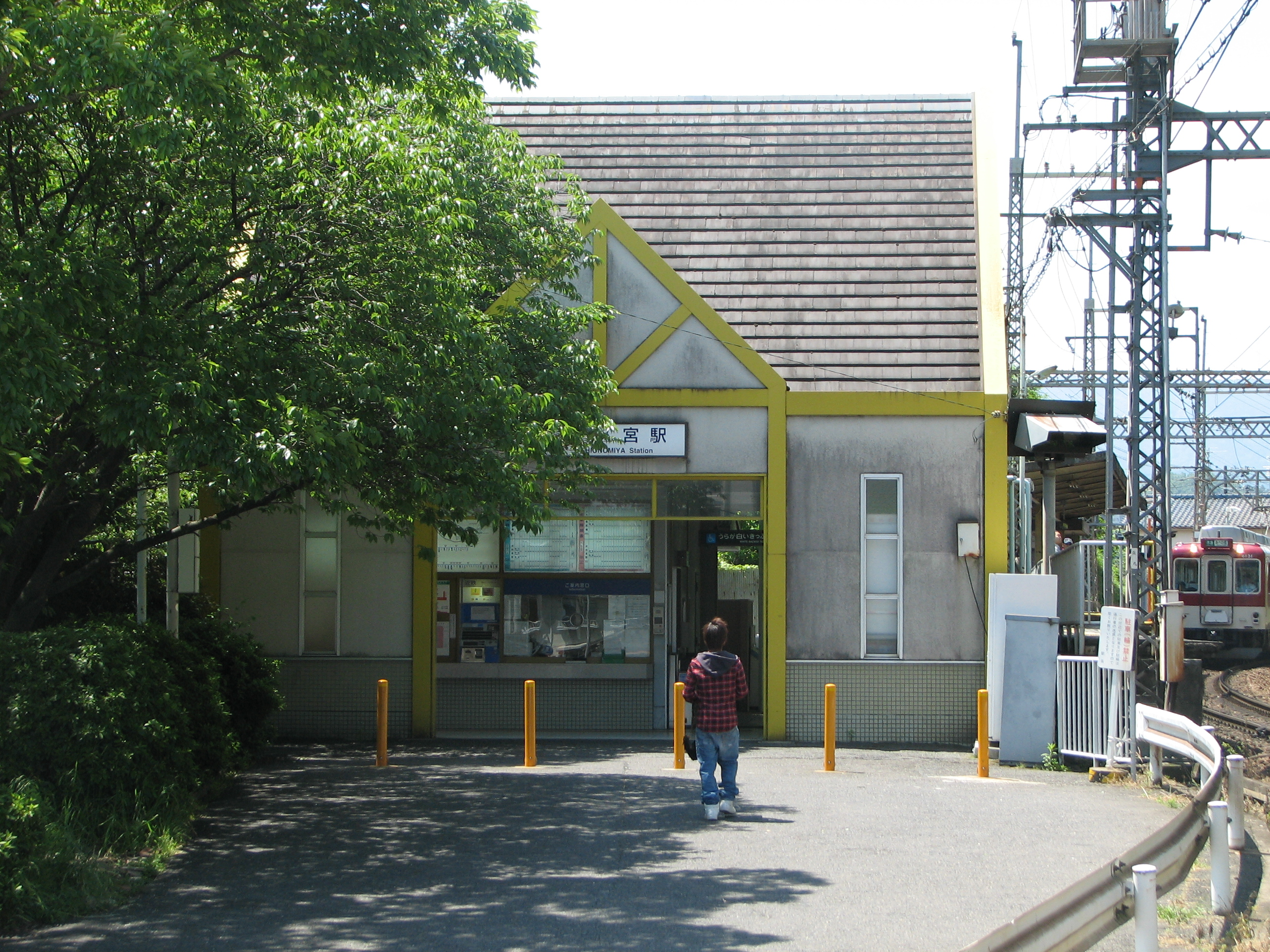
- Shionomiya Station

General information
- Location: 1-3, Shionomiyachō, Kawachinagano-shi, Osaka-fu 586-0011; Japan
- Coordinates: 34°28′1.5″N 135°34′45.4″E
- Operator: Kintetsu Railway
- Line: Nagano Line
- Distance: 28.8 km from Ōsaka Abenobashi
- Platforms: 1 side platform
- Connections

Other information
- Station code: O22
- Website: Official website

History
- Opened: August 15, 1911

Passengers
- 2019: 1079 daily
Location
- Location within Osaka Prefecture Location within Japan

Shionomiya Station (汐ノ宮駅, Shionomiya-eki) is a passenger railway station located in the city of Kawachinagano, Osaka Prefecture, Japan, operated by the private railway operator Kintetsu Railway. It has the station number "O22".

== Lines ==
Shionomiya Station is served by the Kintetsu Nagano Line, and is 10.5 kilometers from the terminus of the line at Furuichi and 28.8 kilometers from Ōsaka Abenobashi.

== Layout ==
The station consists of a single ground-level side platform serving one bi-directional track. When the station was opened in 1911, it had two side platforms serving two tracks, but the northbound track (towards Osaka Abenobashi) was removed in June 1966. The disused second platform can still be seen.

=== Platforms ===
■ Nagano Line	to Kawachinagano for Furuichi and Ōsaka Abenobashi

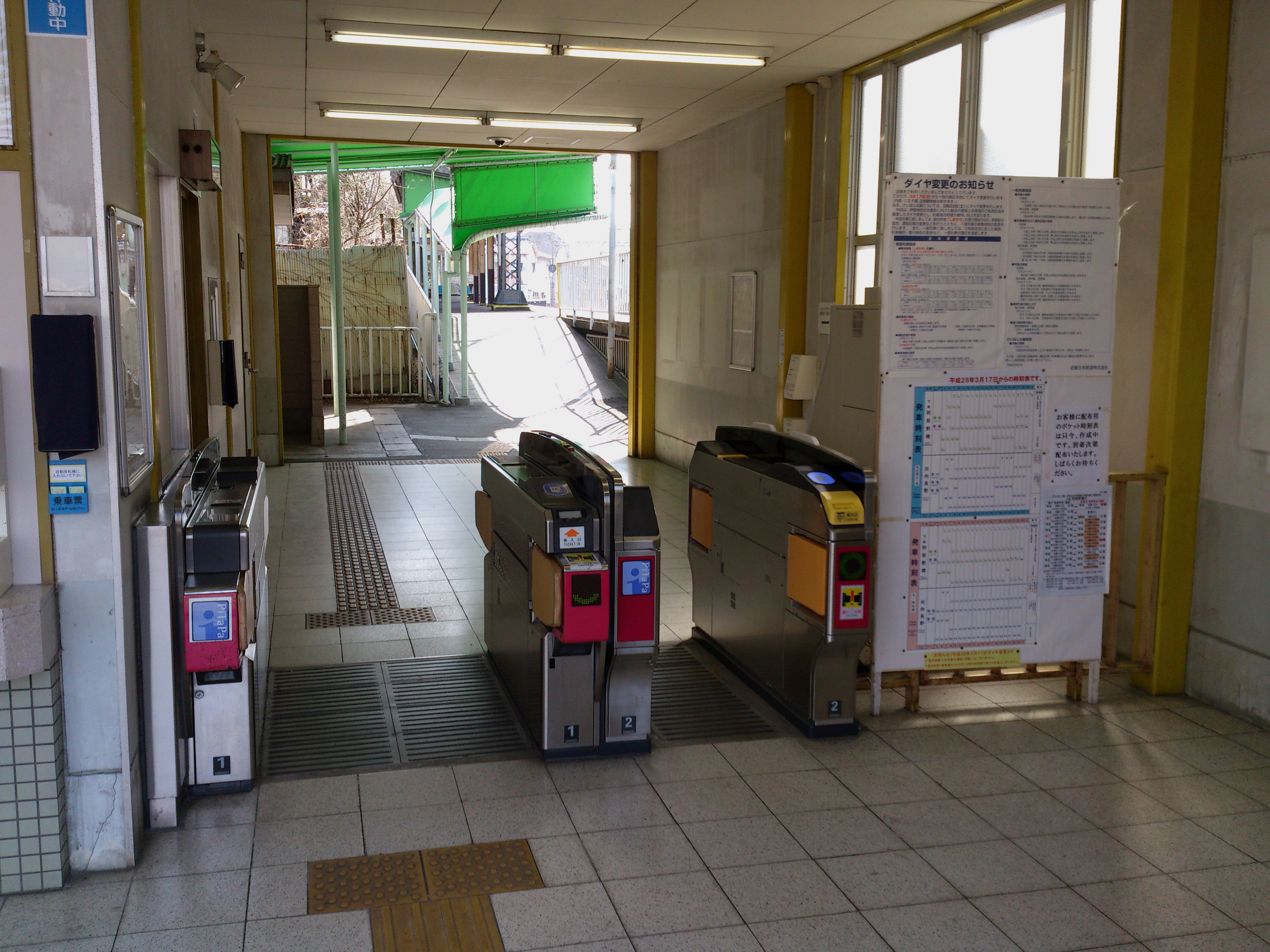
Ticket gates

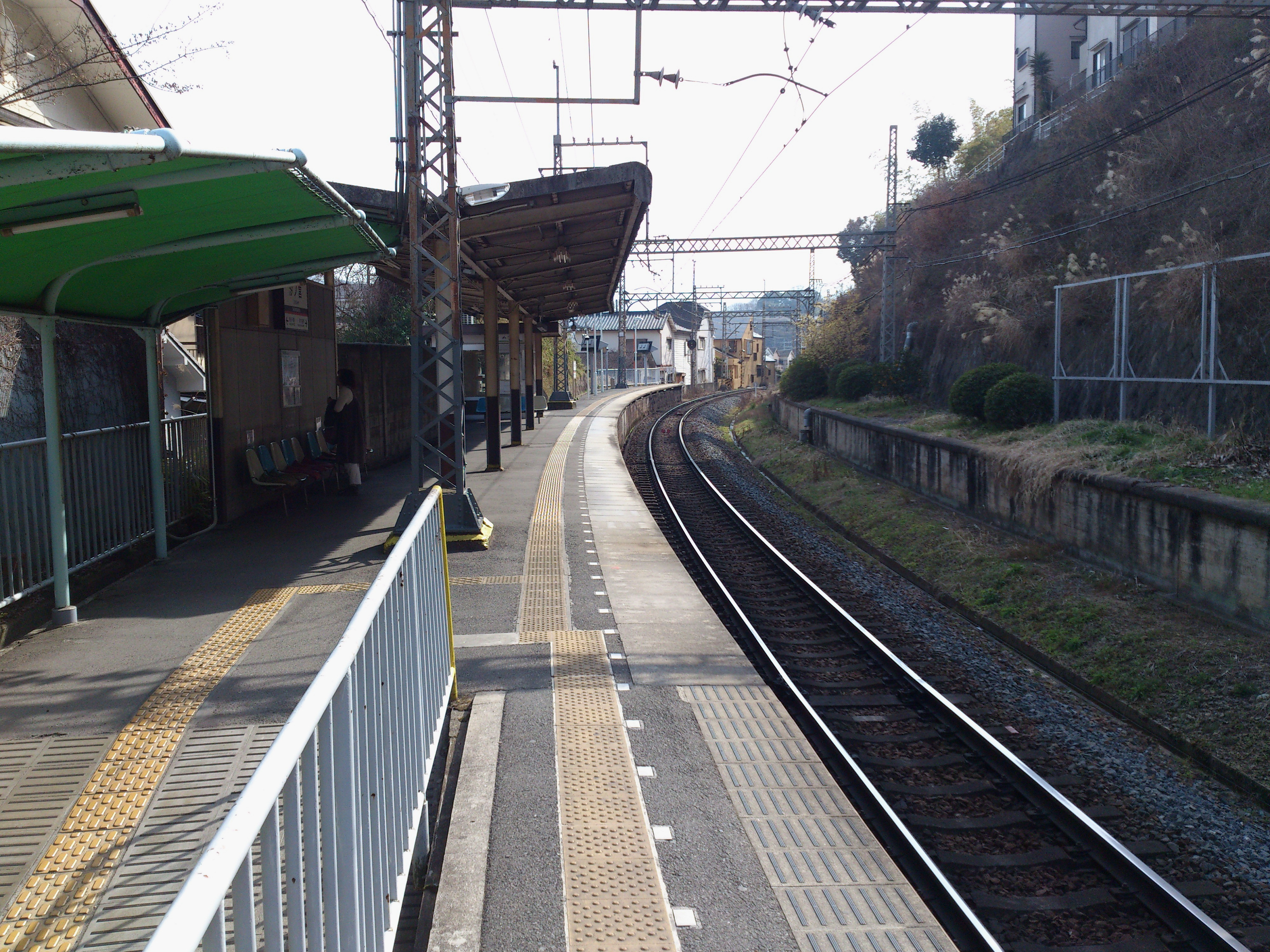
Platform

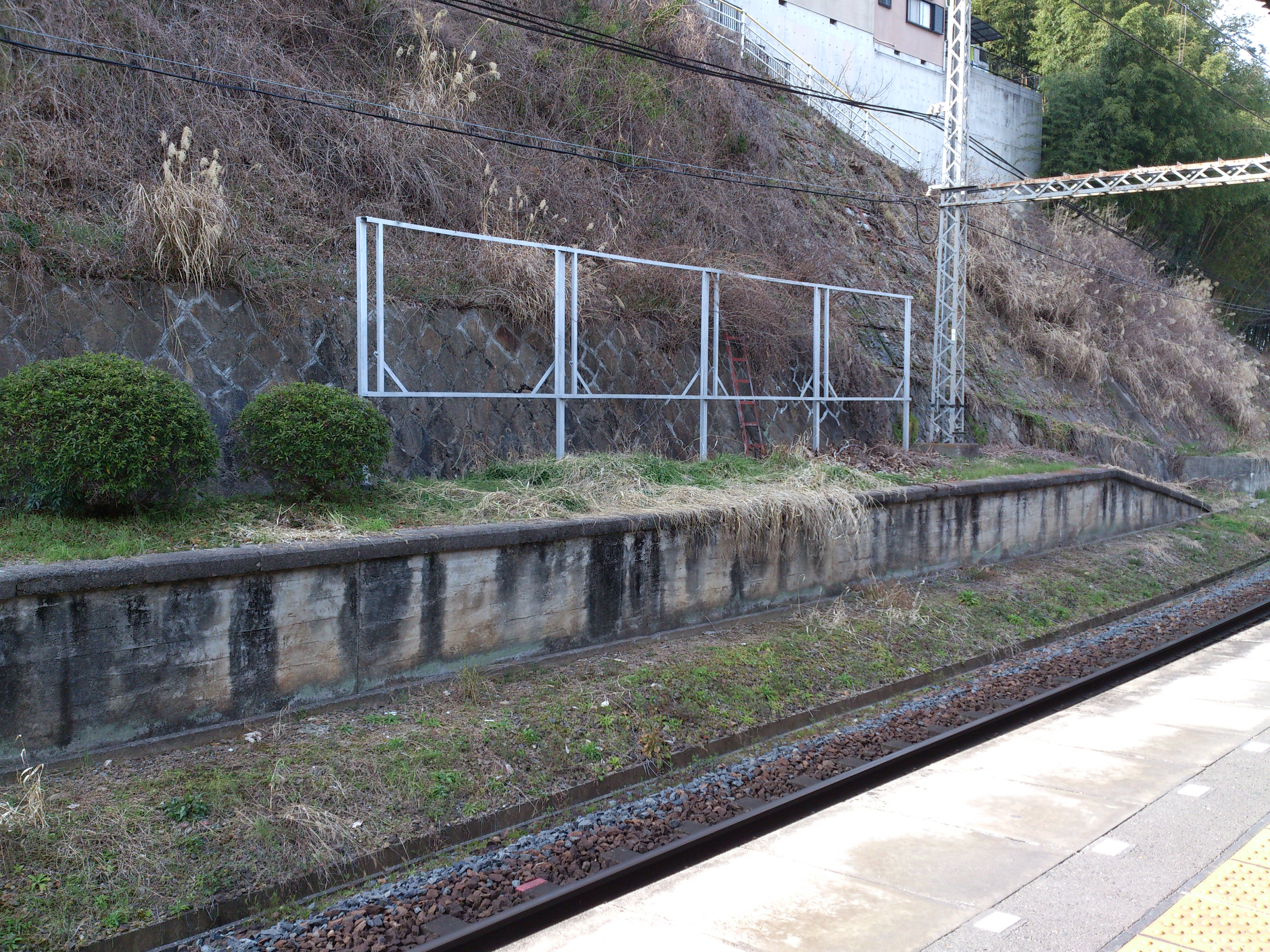
Old platform

== Adjacent stations ==
«	Service	»
Kintetsu Nagano Line
Takidanifudō	Local	Kawachinagano
Takidanifudō	Semi-Express	Kawachinagano
Takidanifudō	Express (Kawachinagano-bound only)	Kawachinagano

== History ==
Shionomiya Station opened on August 15, 1911.

== Passenger statistics ==
In fiscal 2019, the station was used by an average of 1079 passengers daily.

== Surrounding area ==
- Shionomiya Onsen Hospital
- Chiyoda Shrine
- Mejiro Fudo Ganshoji Temple

== See also ==
- List of railway stations in Japan
