= Kawanishi Station =

Kawanishi Station is the name of two train stations in Japan:

- Kawanishi Station (Osaka)
- Kawanishi Station (Yamaguchi)
