= PL Gakuen Women's Junior College =

Japanese women's college

- PL学園女子短期大学
- Type: Private
- Active: 1974–2009
- Location: Tondabayashi, Japan
- Website: www.pl-gakuen.ac.jp/history.html

PL Gakuen Women's Junior College (PL学園女子短期大学, PL Gakuen Joshi Tanki Daigaku) was a private junior college in Tondabayashi Osaka Prefecture, Japan. It was established in 1974 as a junior college of PL Kyodan. A distance course was set up in 1977 and discontinued in 1988. It was abolished in 2009.

== Academic department ==
- Childcare studies
- Primary education studies

== See also ==
- List of junior colleges in Japan
