= Tondabayashi Station =

Railway station in Tondabayashi, Osaka Prefecture, Japan

Tondabayashi Station 富田林駅
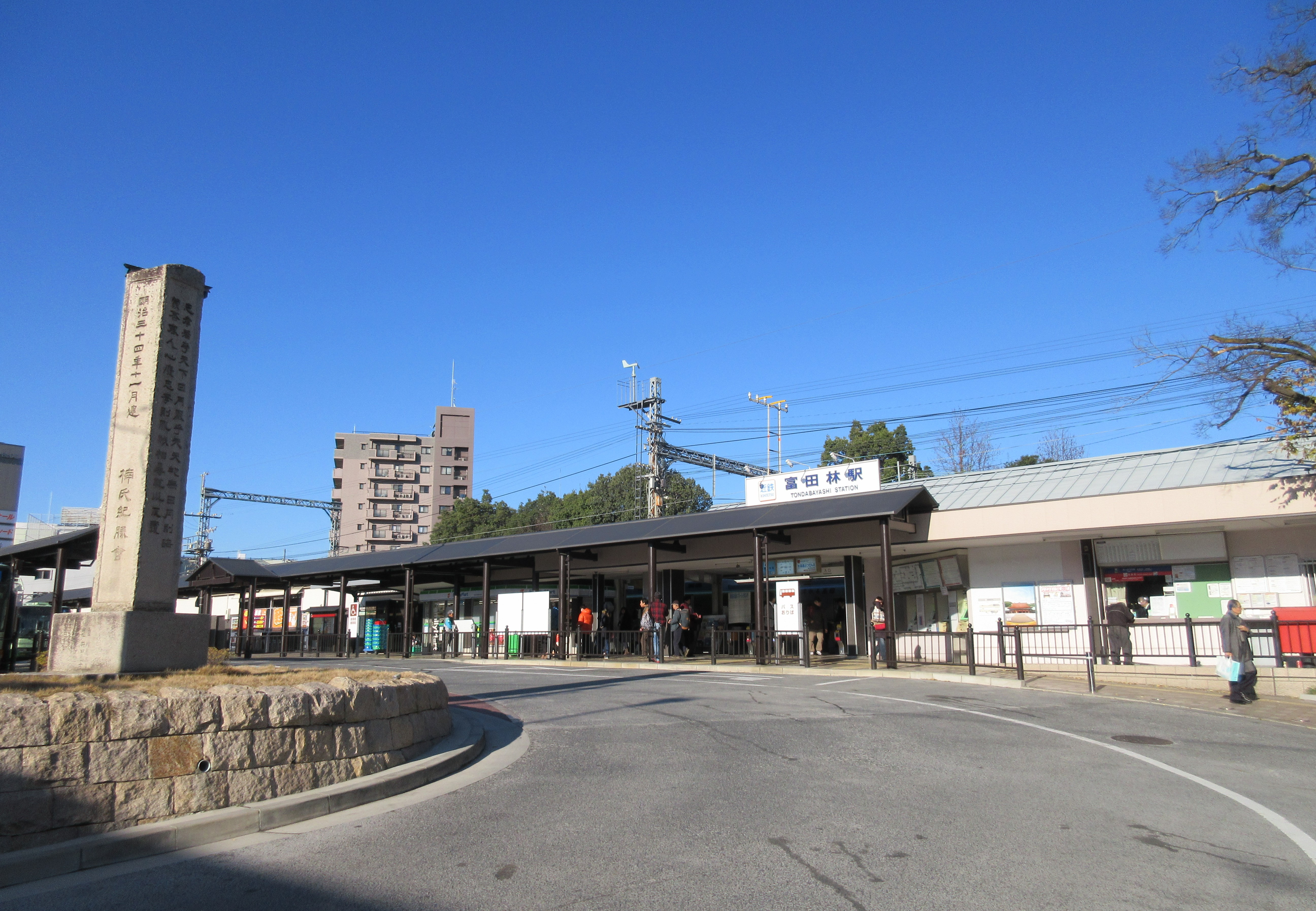
- Kintetsu Tondabayashi Station, North exit

General information
- Location: 18-17, Hommachi, Tondabayashi-shi, Osaka-fu 584-0093; Japan
- Coordinates: 34°30′16.4″N 135°36′4.6″E
- Operator: Kintetsu Railway
- Line: Nagano Line
- Distance: 5.7 km (3.5 miles) from Furuichi
- Platforms: 2 side platforms
- Connections: Bus terminal

Other information
- Station code: O18
- Website: Official website

History
- Opened: 14 April 1898

Passengers
- FY2018: 13,577 daily
Location
- Location within Osaka Prefecture Location within Japan

Tondabayashi Station (富田林駅, Tondabayashi-eki) is a passenger railway station in the city of Tondabayashi, Osaka Prefecture, Japan, operated by the private railway company Kintetsu Railway.

== Lines ==
Tondabayashi Station is served by the Kintetsu Nagano Line, and is located 5.7 kilometers from the terminus of the line at Furuichi and 24.0 kilometers from Ōsaka Abenobashi.The dual track section of the line ends at this station, and there is only one track from that to Kawachi-Nagano.

== Station layout ==
The station consists of two opposed side platforms connected to the station building by an underground passage.

=== Platforms ===
1	■ Nagano Line	for Kawachi-Nagano
2	■ Nagano Line	for Furuichi and Ōsaka Abenobashi

== Adjacent stations ==
«	Service	»
Kintetsu Nagano Line
Kishi	Local (各駅停車)	Tondabayashi-nishiguchi
Kishi	Semi-Express (準急）	Tondabayashi-nishiguchi
Kishi	Express (急行）	Tondabayashi-nishiguchi

== History ==
Tondabayashi Station opened on April 14, 1898.

== Passenger statistics ==
In fiscal 2018, the station was used by an average of 13,577 passengers daily

== Surrounding area ==
- Tondabayashi Jinaimachi
- Tondabayashi City Central Library
- Ishikawa River Park

== See also ==
- List of railway stations in Japan
