= PL Kyodan =

Religious movement founded in Japan

- パーフェクト リバティー教団
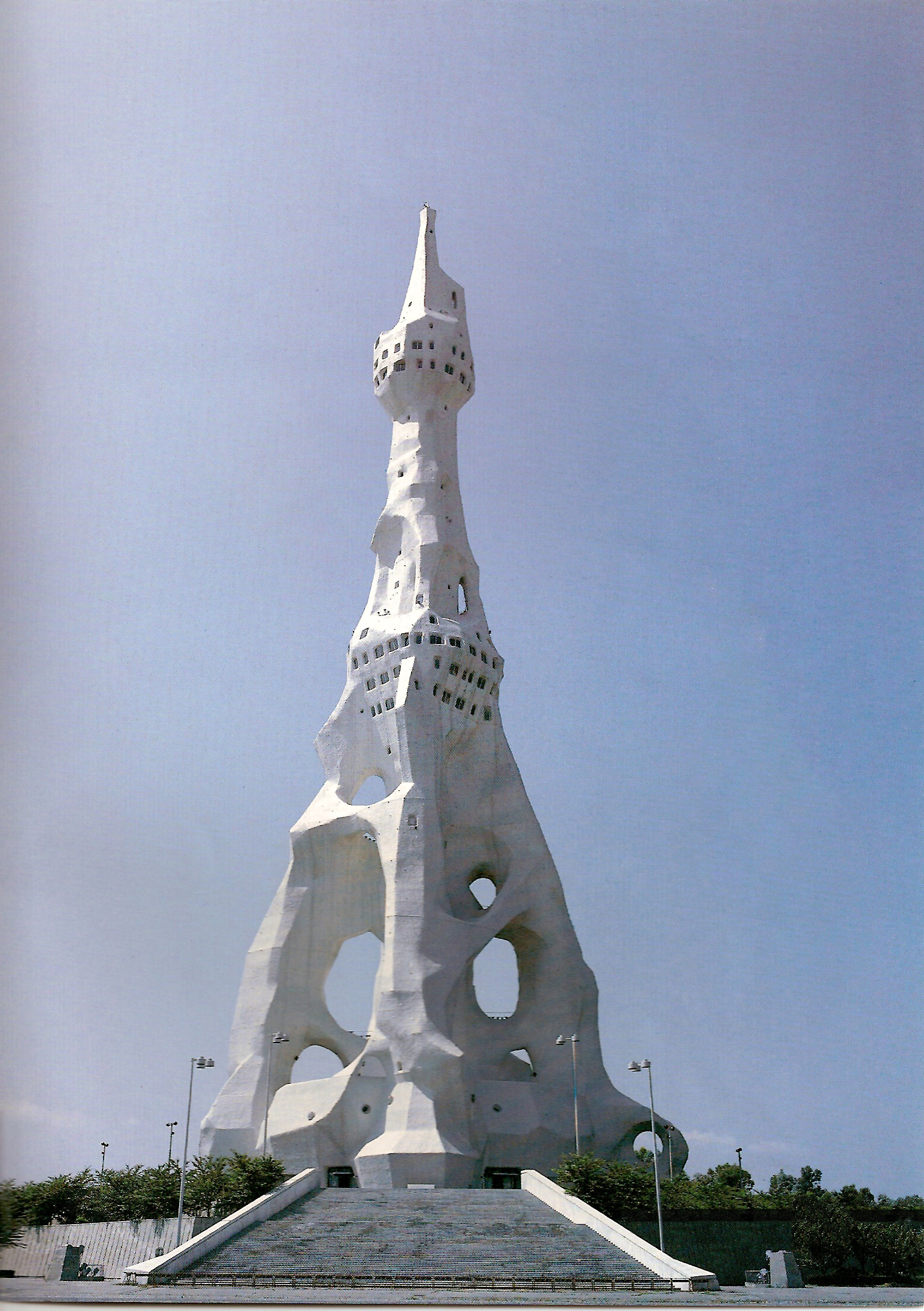
- The Dai Heiwa Kinen Tō, 600-foot-tall (180 m) PL Peace Tower
- Type: Japanese new religion
- Patriarch: Takahito Miki (御木貴日止)
- Headquarters: Tondabayashi, Osaka Prefecture, Japan
- Founder: Tokuharu Miki
- Origin: 1924
- Hospitals: PL Hospital (PL病院)
- Secondary schools: PL Gakuen Junior & Senior High School (PL学園中学校・高等学校)
- Other name: Church of Perfect Liberty
- Official website: www.perfect-liberty.or.jp

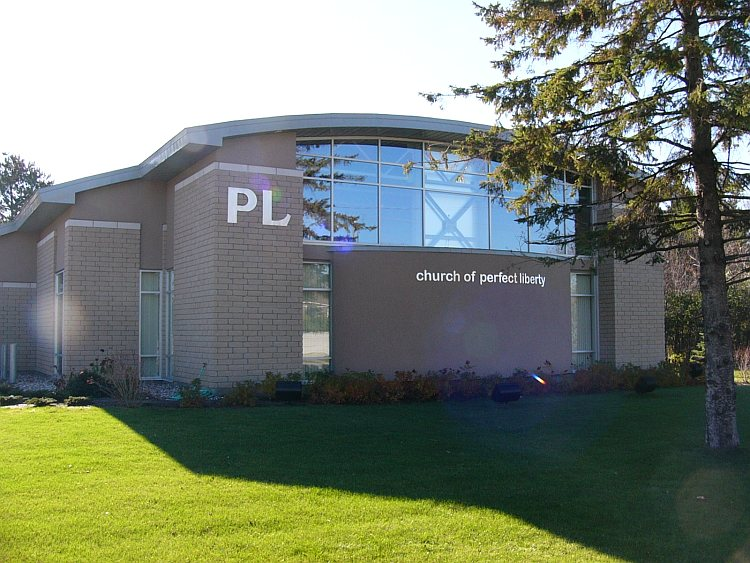
The Church of Perfect Liberty location at 1010 Hunt Club Road Ottawa, Ontario, Canada

PL Kyodan (short for "Perfect Liberty Kyodan"), or the Church of Perfect Liberty (パーフェクト リバティー教団, Pāfekuto Ribatii Kyōdan), is a Japanese shinshūkyō (new religious movement) founded in 1924 by Tokuharu Miki (1871–1938), who was a priest in the Ōbaku sect of Zen Buddhism. The stated aim of the Church of Perfect Liberty is to bring about world peace. It is headquartered in Tondabayashi, Osaka Prefecture, Japan.

== Teachings ==
PL teaches that "Life is Art" and that humans are born to express their own unique individuality in everything they do, "creating true art". To assist them in improving their lives and overcoming hardships, church members are taught why they have these problems and are guided in solving them by the Patriarch (known as oshieoya-sama, 'teacher-parent') and church ministers.

In PL Kyodan, God is referred to as Daigenrei (大元霊) (lit. 'Great Original Spirit') or Mioya Ōkami (大元霊) (lit. 'Great Parent God'), both of which are different readings of the same characters (大元霊).

=== Precepts ===
PL does not have a holy book, but it has 21 PL Precepts (PL処世訓21ヵ条) which were announced by Tokuchika Miki on September 29, 1947. They became the basic teachings of the Church.

The 21 PL precepts are:

1. Life is art (人生は芸術である)
2. To live is to express one's self (人の一生は自己表現である, hito no isshō wa jiko hyōgen de aru)
3. God appears through one's self (自己は神の表現である, jiko wa kami no hyōgen de aru)
4. Being annoyed limits your expression (表現せざれば悩がある)
5. One's self is lost by being emotional (感情に走れば自己を失う)
6. Efface your self conceptions (自我無きところに汝がある)
7. Everything exists in relativity (一切は相対と在る)
8. Live as the sun (日の如く明かに生きよ)
9. Human beings are all equal (人は平等である)
10. Love yourself and others (自他を祝福せよ)
11. Always be with god (一切を神に依れ)
12. Everything has a way according to its name (名に因って道がある, na ni yotte michi ga aru)
13. There is a way for men and a way for women (男性には男性の，女性には女性の道がある)
14. World peace is everything (世界平和の為の一切である)
15. All is a mirror (一切は鏡である)
16. All things progress and develop (一切は進歩発展する)
17. Grasp what is most essential (中心を把握せよ, chūshin o haaku seyo)
18. Each moment is a turning point (常に善悪の岐路に立つ)
19. Begin once you perceive (悟る即立つ)
20. Live maintaining equilibrium between mind and matter (物心両全の境に生きよ)
21. Live in perfect liberty (真の自由に生きよ, shin no jiyū ni ikiyo)

Other texts used by PL Kyodan include PL Gaido Bukku (PLガイドブック) [PL Guidebook] and PL kyōten (PL経典) [PL Prayer Book].

== Membership ==
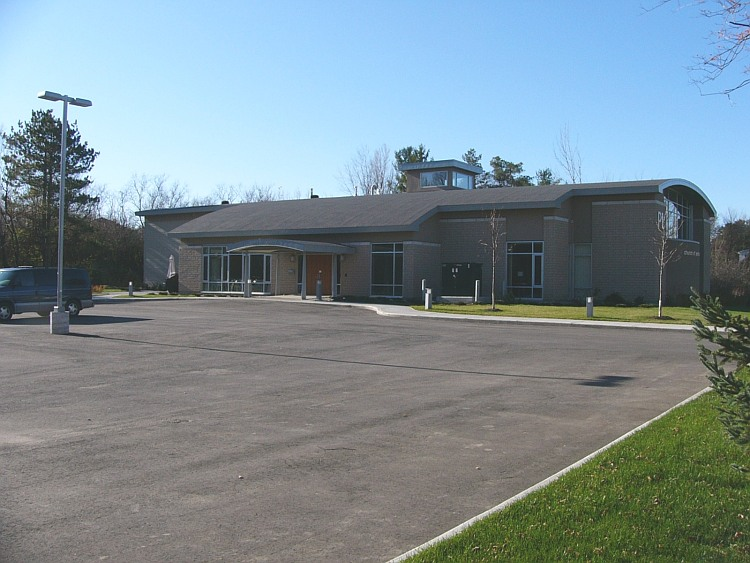
The Church of Perfect Liberty in Ottawa, Ontario, Canada

The church claims to have more than one million followers worldwide and 500 churches located in ten countries.

Most of the parishes are located in Japan, but due to the active missionary work in the 1960s PL was established in South America and the United States as well. In the 21st century it also has a presence in Canada, Brazil, Argentina, Paraguay, and Peru. The Oceanian headquarters was founded in the 1990s in Brisbane, Australia. Small communities exist in Europe as well, especially in France, Portugal, and Hungary.

1970 saw the construction of the 600-foot-tall (180 m) PL Peace Tower, a monument to all the people who have died in war, from the beginning of time.

== Organization ==
PL's spiritual leader, the Patriarch, is called Oshieoya-sama ('Father of the Teachings'). The third and current Patriarch of the church is Takahito Miki (御木貴日止). Miki is also the vice president of Shinshuren, the Federation of New Religious Organizations of Japan.

The second Patriarch, Tokuchika Miki, visited the Holy See three times, and met two popes to improve inter-religious cooperation.

== Activities ==
Every year on August 1, the PL Art of Fireworks is held to commemorate the two founders of PL Kyodan.
