= Osaka Ohtani University =

University in Osaka Prefecture, Japan

- 大阪大谷大学
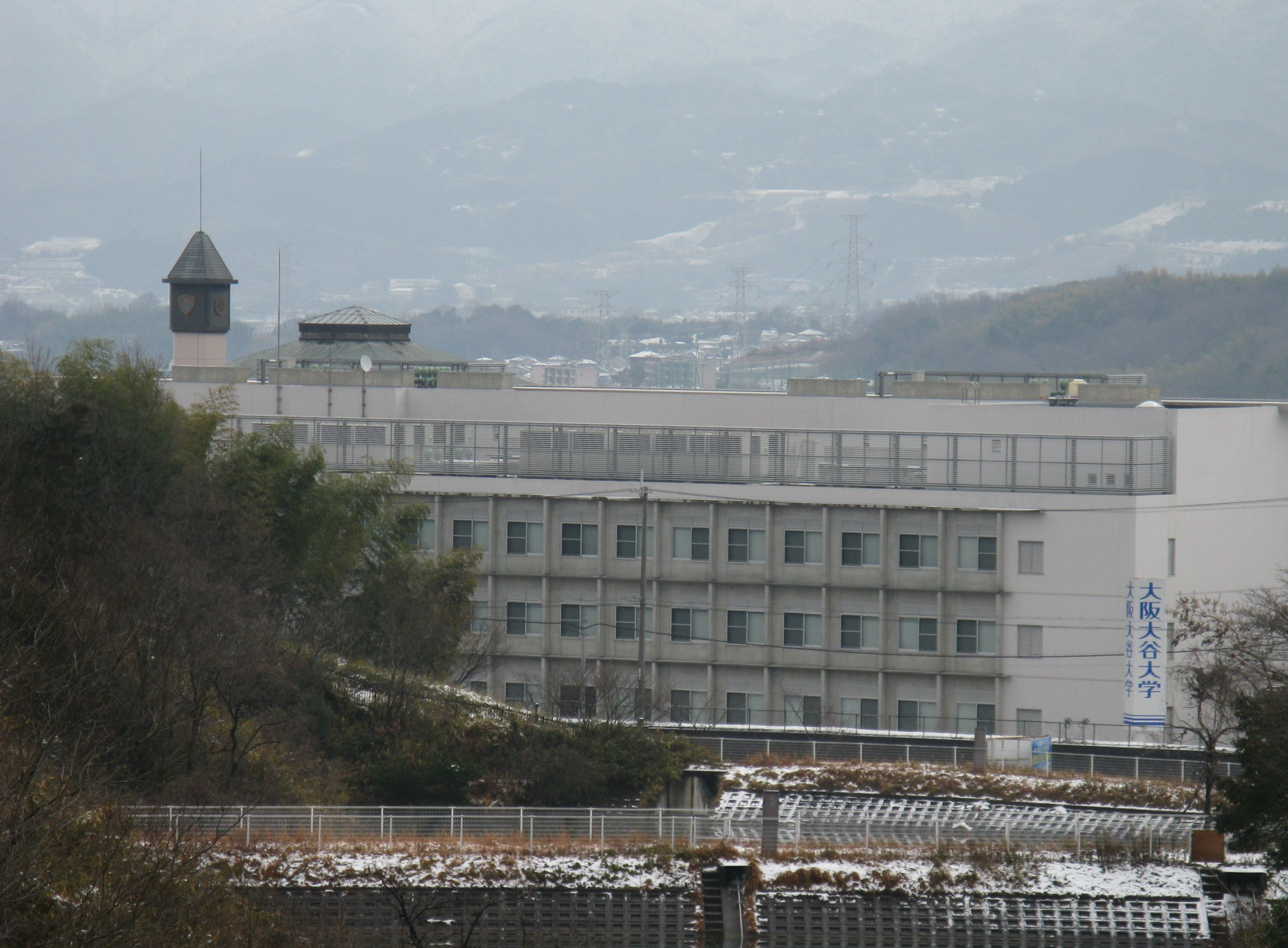
- Osaka Ohtani University
- Type: Private
- Established: 1966
- Religious affiliation: Ōtani-ha, Buddhism
- Location: Tondabayashi, Osaka, Japan; 34°28′57″N 135°34′52″E
- Campus: Suburb
- Website: www.osaka-ohtani.ac.jp
- Osaka Ohtani University

Osaka Ohtani University (大阪大谷大学, Ōsaka ōtani daigaku) is a private university in Tondabayashi, Osaka, Japan. The school was established in 1966 as a junior women's college. In 2006 it became coeducational, adopting the present name.
