= Tondabayashi =

Tondabayashi 富田林市
- City
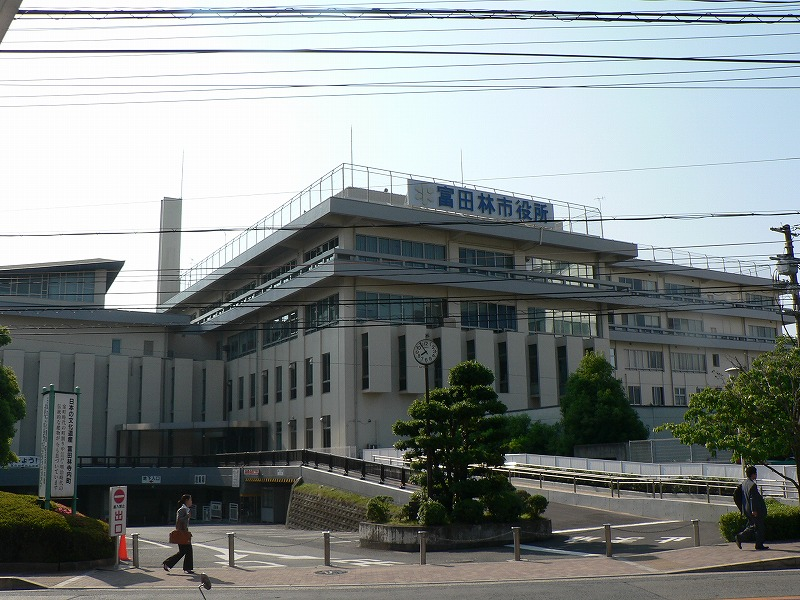
- Tondabayashi City Hall

- Flag Seal

- Location of Tondabayashi in Osaka Prefecture

- Location in Japan
- Coordinates: 34°30′N 135°36′E
- Country: Japan
- Region: Kansai
- Prefecture: Osaka

Government
  - Mayor: Toshiki Tada

Area
  - Total: 39.72 km^{2} (15.34 sq mi)

Population (January 31, 2021)
  - Total: 108,803
  - Density: 2,739/km^{2} (7,095/sq mi)
- Time zone: UTC+09:00 (JST)
- City hall address: 1-1, Tokiwachō, Tondabayashi-shi, Ōsaka-fu 584-8511
- Website: Official website
- Symbols
- Flower: Azalea
- Tree: Camphor laurel

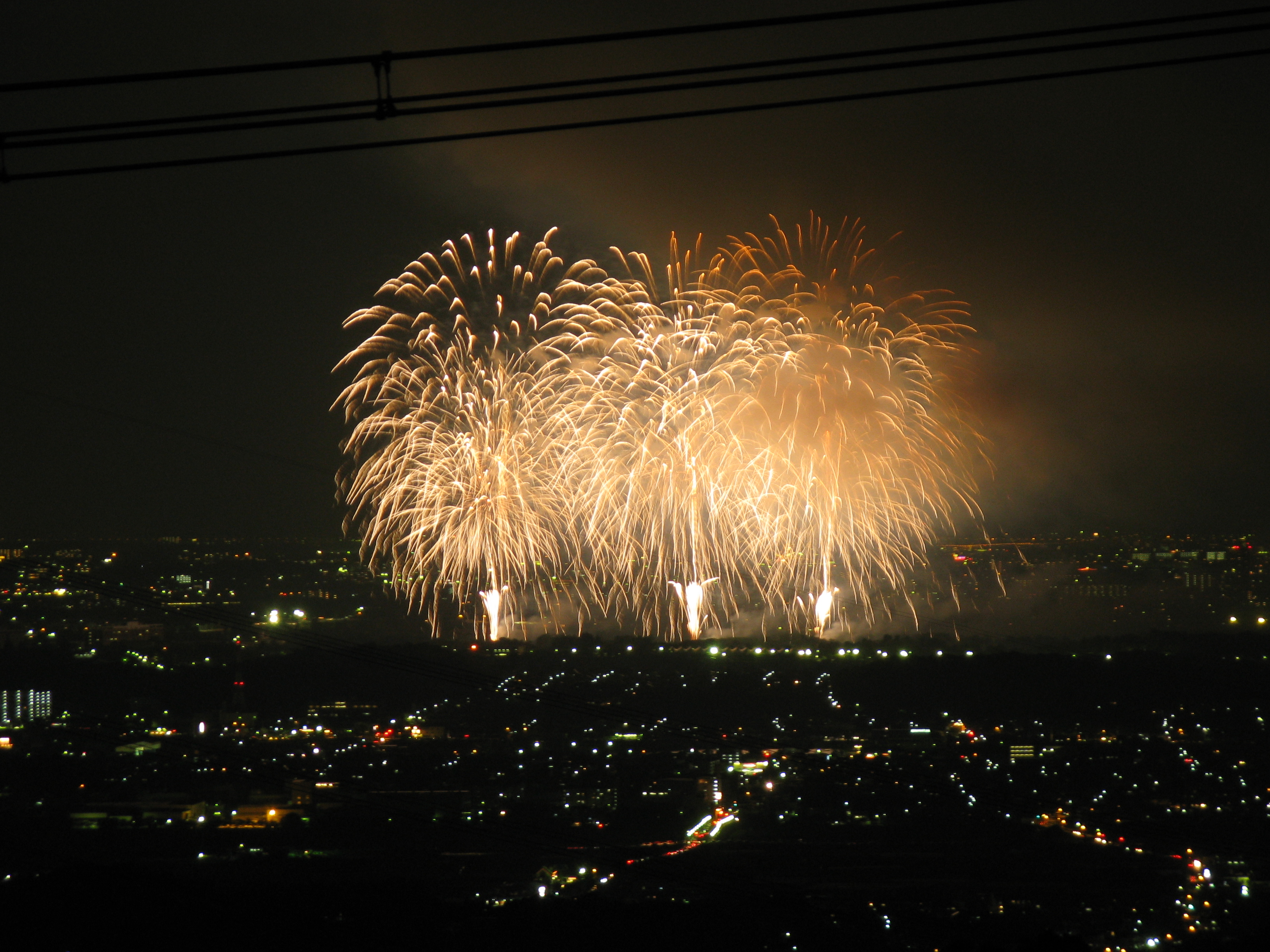
Perfect Liberty Firework Festival in August, as famous for firework festival in Japan

Tondabayashi (富田林市, Tondabayashi-shi) is a city located in Osaka Prefecture, Japan. As of 31 January 2022, the city had an estimated population of 108,803, in 51,632 households and a population density of 1200 persons per km^{2}. The total area of the city is 39.72 square kilometres (15.34 sq mi).

== Geography ==
Tondabayashi is located in the southeastern part of Osaka Prefecture.The northeastern part of the city is flat, and the Ishikawa River passes through the town. The southern part of the city is hilly, rising gradually to the Kongō Range and Katsuragi Mountains.

=== Neighboring municipalities ===
Osaka Prefecture

- Chihayaakasaka
- Habikino
- Kawachinagano
- Kanan
- Ōsakasayama
- Sakai
- Taishi

== Climate ==
Tondabayashi has a humid subtropical climate (Köppen Cfa) characterized by warm summers and cool winters with light to no snowfall. The average annual temperature in Tondabayashi is 14.2 °C. The average annual rainfall is 1475 mm with September as the wettest month. The temperatures are highest on average in August, at around 26.3 °C, and lowest in January, at around 2.7 °C.

== Demographics ==
Per Japanese census data, the population of Tondabayashi has increased rapidly in the 1960s and 1970s, and peaked at around the year 2000.

Historical population
Year	Pop.	±%
1920	19,336	—
1930	21,064	+8.9%
1940	24,035	+14.1%
1950	32,781	+36.4%
1960	36,261	+10.6%
1970	75,754	+108.9%
1980	97,495	+28.7%
1990	110,447	+13.3%
2000	126,558	+14.6%
2010	119,454	−5.6%

== History ==
The area of the modern city of Tondabayashi was within ancient Kawachi Province. During the Sengoku period, it developed as a temple town centered on the Buddhist temple of Kosho-ji Betsu-in. The village of Tondabayashi was established within Ishikawa District with the creation of the modern municipalities system on April 1, 1889. On April 1, 1896 the area became part of Minamikawachi District, Osaka. Tondabayashi was promoted to town status on August 1, 1896 and to city status on April 1, 1950.

== Government ==
Tondabayashi has a mayor-council form of government with a directly elected mayor and a unicameral city council of 18 members. Tondabayashi collectively with the city of Ōsakasayama, and other municipalities of Minamikawachi District contributes two members to the Osaka Prefectural Assembly. In terms of national politics, the city is part of Osaka 15th district of the lower house of the Diet of Japan.

== Economy ==
The city is an agricultural region, with eggplants, strawberries, cucumbers as major crops. Traditionally, the area is known for its production of bamboo blinds.

== Education ==
Tondabayashi has 16 public elementary schools and eight public middle schools operated by the city government and three public high schools operated by the Osaka Prefectural Department of Education. There are also one private elementary school, two private middle schools and two private high school. The prefecture also operated one special education school for the handicapped. Osaka Ohtani University is located in Tondabayashi and Aino University has a campus in the city. PL Gakuen Women's Junior College was active 1974 to 2009.

== Transportation ==
=== Railway ===
Kintetsu Railway – Kintetsu Nagano Line

- Kishi - Tondabayashi - Tondabayashi-nishiguchi - Kawanishi - Takidanifudō

Nankai Electric Railway - Koya Line

- Takidani

=== Highway ===
- National Route 170
- National Route 309

== Local attractions ==
- Great Peace Prayer Tower
- Kosho-ji Betsu-in
- PL Art of Fireworks Display
- Ryusen-ji, National Place of Scenic Beauty
- Shindō temple ruins and Okameishi Kofun, National Historic Sites
- Takidani Fudomyoo-ji
- Tondabayashi Jinaimachi, Important Preservation Districts for Groups of Traditional Buildings

== Sister cities ==
- Bethlehem, Pennsylvania, United States
- Pengzhou, Sichuan Province, China

== Noted people from Tondabayashi ==
- Harumi Fujita, composer
- Tadamitsu Kishimoto, scientist
- Tsuneyasu Miyamoto, football coach and player
- Chieko Naniwa, actress
