= Tondabayashi Jinaimachi =

Tondabayashi-shi Tondabayashi 富田林市富田林
- Important Preservation District for Groups of Traditional Buildings
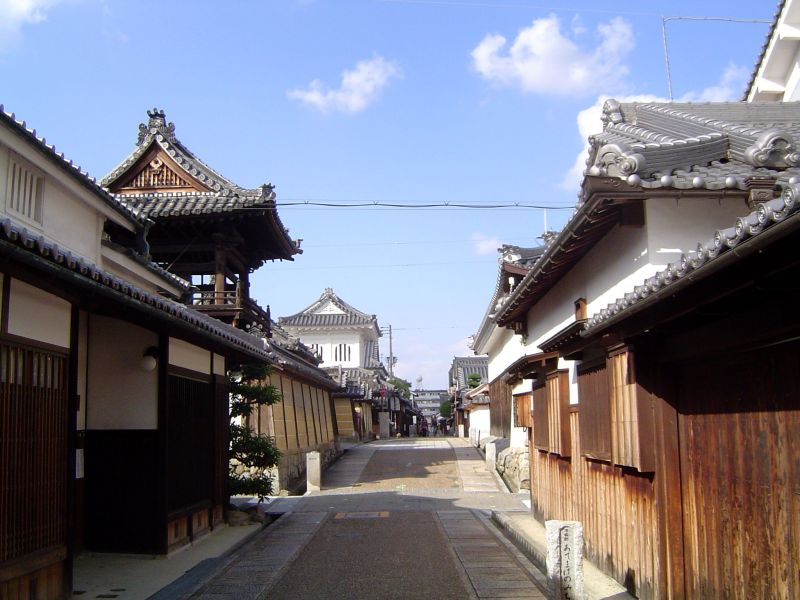
- 城之門筋(Jonomon-street)

- Location in Japan Tondabayashi-shi Tondabayashi (Japan) Tondabayashi-shi Tondabayashi (Asia)
- Coordinates: 34°30′1.181″N 135°36′9.900″E
- Country: Japan
- Region: Kansai
- Prefecture: Osaka
- Municipal: Tondabayashi
- Purchased of land: about 1558
- Founder: Shoshu, the 16th chief priest of Kosho-ji temple

Area
  - Total: 0.129 km^{2} (0.050 sq mi)
- Highest elevation: 67 m (220 ft)
- Lowest elevation: 64 m (210 ft)

Tondabayashi Jinaimachi (富田林寺内町) is a popular name of the old temple-based town (Jinaimachi) located in Tondabayashi City, Osaka Prefecture, Japan. It is one of the Important Preservation Districts for Groups of Traditional Buildings (1997) in Tondabayashi-shi Tondabayashi (富田林市富田林重要伝統的建造物群保存地区). The town retains town blocks from the Sengoku period, along with machiyas (traditional wooden town residences) built from the mid-Edo period on.

== Geography ==
Tondabayashi Jinaimachi is located at the center of the city, on a fluvial terrace at left bank of the Ishi river and the midstream. Most of the old town area falls within the jurisdiction of Tondabayashi-cho (富田林町); the rest of the area is in Hon-machi (本町). Tondabayashi-cho adheres to the old town since the Edo period.

The town has an area of 12.9 hectares. It was formed in an ellipsoidal form, measuring 400m from east to west and 350m from north to south. The town layout was designed with a grid plan, which consists of six streets in a north–south direction and seven streets in an east–west direction. There are 25 quadrilateral town blocks in the center, and 16 irregular town blocks on the outer edge.

The relative elevation is about 10m from the river to the town. It used a natural terrace cliff to construct the earthworks (土居, doi) with bamboo groves at the eastern, southern and western edge of the town, and the dug-out moat (堀割, horiwari) at the northern edge.

== History ==
About 1558 (Eiroku 1), Kosho-ji temple obtained a wasteland of the Tonda (富田) for temple grounds. Kosho-ji temple cooperated with eight headmen (八人衆) to construct a branch temple, town blocks, residences and dry fields. They changed the name of Jinaimachi to Tondabayashi (富田林).

In the Sengoku period, Kosho-ji branch temple (興正寺別院) and Jinaimachi were granted privileges and immunities by authorities. The town people governed autonomously against a background of religious authority of Kosho-ji temple.

Over the Edo period, the town forfeited its privileges and immunities. In the early Edo period, the town was developed as Zaigoumachi (在郷町, merchant town in the countryside). Many people came from the surrounding villages and the town prospered with merchants offering lumber, cotton, rapeseed oil, and sake.

After the Meiji Restoration, the town continued to prosper as the political and commercial center of southern Kawachi. From the latter Meiji period onward, the town headed gradually into a decline due to the opening of the railway, land reform, and motorization. As a result, it was left out of postwar development.

== Traditional buildings ==
=== Temples ===
- Kosho-ji branch temple
- Myokei-ji temple
- Jokoku-ji temple

=== Machiyas ===
- Old Sugiyama family residence
- Nakamura family residence

=== Modern architectures ===
- Nakauchi ophthalmic clinic

== Notable people ==
- Tsuyuko Isonokami

== See also ==
- Tondabayashi, Osaka

== Sources ==
- 富田林興正寺別院 (2012). 富田林興正寺別院伽藍総合調査報告書 (in Japanese).
- 富田林市 (1984). 富田林寺内町 歴史的町並み保全計画調査報告書 (in Japanese).
- 富田林市教育委員会 (1999). 富田林寺内町ガイド じないまち探究誌 (in Japanese).
- 全国伝統的建造物群保存地区協議会 (2017). 伝統的建造物群保存地区 歴史の町並 (in Japanese).
- 富田林市 (1987). 重要文化財 旧杉山家住宅修理工事報告書 (in Japanese).
- Tondabayashi City Boards of Education. Tondabayashi Jinai-machi Walking Tour Map.
- 富田林市 (May 18, 2018). "重要伝統的建造物群保存地区の追加選定について".
