= Nagano Line (Kintetsu) =

Railway line in Japan

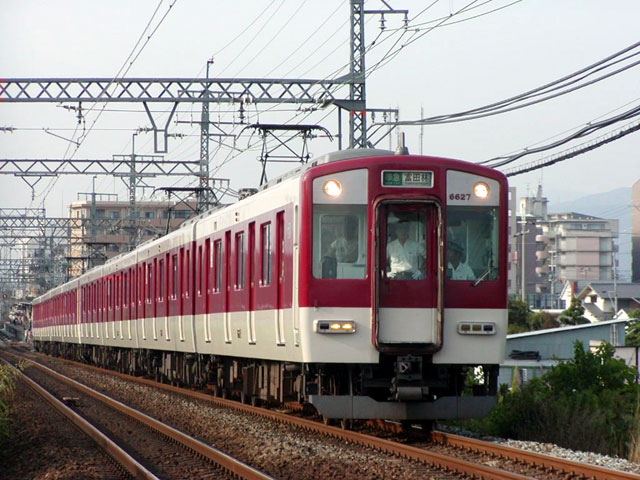

Overview
- Owner: Kintetsu Railway
- Line number: O
- Locale: Osaka Prefecture
- Termini: Kawachinagano; Furuichi
- Stations: 8
- Color on map: (#008446)

Service
- Type: Commuter rail
- System: Kintetsu Railway
- Operator(s): Kintetsu Railway

History
- Opened: 14 April 1898; 126 years ago
- Last extension: 12 December 1902; 122 years ago

Technical
- Line length: 12.5 km (7.8 mi)
- Track gauge: 1,067 mm (3 ft 6 in)
- Electrification: 1,500 V DC (overhead line)
- Operating speed: 90 km/h (56 mph)
- Signalling: Automatic closing block
- Train protection system: Kintetsu ATS

The Nagano Line (長野線, Kintetsu Nagano-sen) is a railway line of Japanese private railway company Kintetsu Railway. It branches off Minami-Osaka Line at Furuichi in southern suburbs of Osaka. The line connects cities of Habikino, Tondabayashi and Kawachi-Nagano in Osaka Prefecture, terminates at Kawachinagano with connection to Nankai Electric Railway Kōya Line.

== History ==
The Nagano Line was constructed and opened between 1898 and 1902 as the sole line of Kayō Railway (河陽鉄道, Kayō Tetsudō) who aimed to connect inland town Kawachinagano to Kashiwara on the Kansai Main Line (then of Kansei Railway (関西鉄道, Kansei Tetsudō, also read as Kwansei, Kansai)). The company renamed itself the Osaka Railway Co. in 1919 (being the second company of that name) and decided and built its own line directly to Osaka, branching from Dōmyōji. The company then opened a line diverting from Furuichi to Nara Prefecture, to complete present Minami Osaka Line. Thus the line to Kawachi-Nagano became a branch line, present Nagano Line.

The line was electrified at 1500 VDC in 1923, and the company merged with Kintetsu in 1944. The Furuichi - Kishi section was duplicated in 1957, and extended to Tondabayashi in 1974.

In September 2024, services had to be reduced due to a shortage of drivers.

== Operation ==
Nearly all trains go through up to/down from Ōsaka Abenobashi on Minami-Osaka Line. A few trains return at Tondabayashi.

=== Service ===
All trains stop at all stations on the Nagano Line. Most trains are operated as a Semi express.

Local (普通, Futsū) (L)
Limited number of operation, in the morning down to Tondabayashi or Kawachi-Nagano, in midnight up to Furuichi or Osaka Abenobashi.
Semi-Express (準急, Junkyū) (SE)
Four trains per hour per direction, all day, all to/from Osaka Abenobashi.
Express (急行, Kyūkō) (Ex)
In the rush hours, to/from Osaka Abenobashi.

== Stations ==
All stations are located in Osaka Prefecture.

Local trains (普通) stop at every station. Therefore, it is omitted here.

No.	Station	Japanese	Distance (km)	SE	Ex	Transfers	Location
O16	Furuichi	古市	0.0	●	●	F Minami Osaka Line (F16)	Habikino
O17	Kishi	喜志	3.4	●	●		Tondabayashi
O18	Tondabayashi	富田林	5.7	●	●		Tondabayashi
O19	Tondabayashi-nishiguchi	富田林西口	6.3	●	●		Tondabayashi
O20	Kawanishi	川西	7.3	●	●		Tondabayashi
O21	Takidanifudō (Osaka Otani University)	滝谷不動 (大阪大谷大学前)	8.7	●	●		Tondabayashi
O22	Shionomiya	汐ノ宮	10.5	●	●		Kawachi-Nagano
O23	Kawachinagano	河内長野	12.5	●	●	Nankai Koya Line (NK69)	Kawachi-Nagano
