= Furuichi Station (Osaka) =

Railway station in Habikino, Osaka Prefecture, Japan

Furuichi Station 古市駅
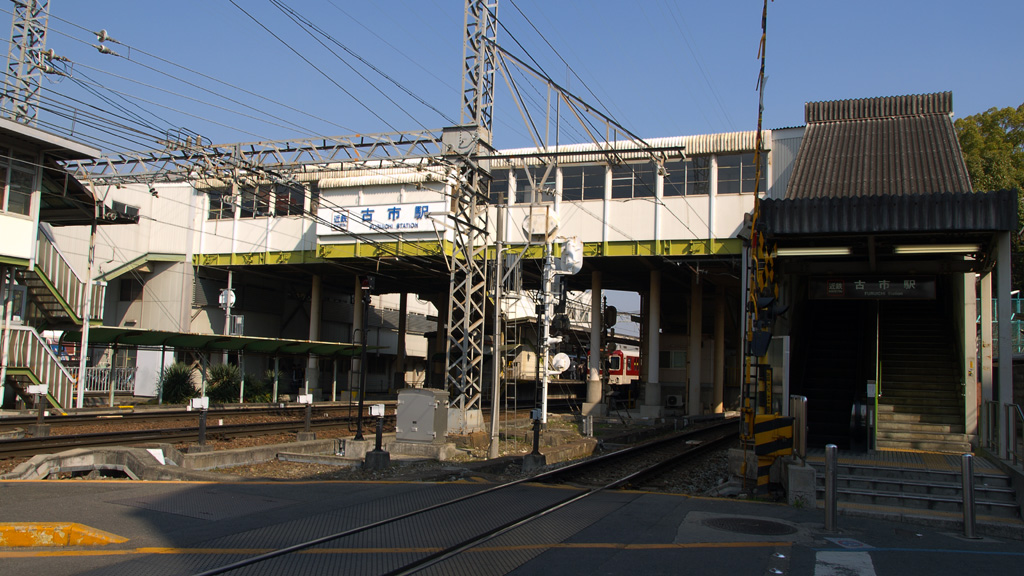
- Station building, March 2007

General information
- Location: 1-22, Furuichi 1-chōme, Habikino-shi, Osaka-fu 583-0852; Japan
- Coordinates: 34°33′12.87″N 135°36′31.91″E
- Operator: Kintetsu Railway
- Lines: Minami Osaka Line; Nagano Line
- Distance: 18.3 km (11.4 mi) from Ōsaka Abenobashi
- Platforms: 2 island platforms
- Connections: Bus terminal

Other information
- Station code: F16, O16
- Website: Official website

History
- Opened: March 24, 1898; 128 years ago

Passengers
- FY2018: 20937 daily
Location
- Location within Osaka Prefecture Location within Japan

Furuichi Station (古市駅, Furuichi-eki) is a junction passenger railway station in located in the city of Habikino, Osaka Prefecture, Japan, operated by the private railway operator Kintetsu Railway.

== Lines ==
Furuichi Station is served by the Minami Osaka Line, and is located 18.3 rail kilometers from the starting point of the line at Ōsaka Abenobashi Station. It is also a terminus of the Kintetsu Nagano Line and is 12.5 kilometers from the opposing terminus at Kawachinagano Station.

== Station layout ==
The station was consists of two ground-level island platforms connected by an elevated station building.

=== Platforms ===
| 1, 2 | ■ Minami-Osaka Line | for Kashiharajingū-mae, Yoshino and Gose |
| 1, 2 | ■ Nagano Line | for Tondabayashi and Kawachi-Nagano |
| 3, 4 | ■ Minami-Osaka Line | for Ōsaka Abenobashi |

== Adjacent stations ==
| « | Service | » |
Kintetsu
Minami-Osaka Line (F16)
| Dōmyōji (F15) | Local | Komagatani (F17) |
| Dōmyōji (F15) | Semi-Express | Komagatani (F17) |
| Ōsaka Abenobashi (F01) | Suburban Express | Shakudo (F23) |
| Ōsaka Abenobashi (F01) | Express | Shakudo (F23) |
| Ōsaka Abenobashi (F01) | Limited Express (northbound: first - 9:34 a.m. or 9:35 a.m.) (southbound: departing from Osaka Abenobashi after 8 p.m.) | Shakudo (F23) |
Nagano Line (O16)
| Dōmyōji (F15, Minami-Osaka Line) | Local | Kishi (O17) |
| Dōmyōji (F15, Minami-Osaka Line) | Semi-Express | Kishi (O17) |
| Ōsaka Abenobashi (F15, Minami-Osaka Line) | Express | Kishi (O17) |

=== Bus services ===
Kintetsu Bus Co., Ltd. - Furuichi-ekimae

- Platform 1
  - Route 64 for Fujiidera-ekimae via Karusato and Nonoue
  - Route 74 for Fujiidera-ekimae via Karusato, Nonaka, and Fujigaoka
  - Route 77 for Fujiidera-ekimae via Habikino City Hall and Fujigaoka
  - Route 84 for Osaka Prefecture University Habikino Campus via Karusato and Habikiyama Jutaku
  - Route 85 for Momoyamada Nichome and Gakuen-mae Gochome via Karusato and Habikiyama Jutaku
- Platform 2
  - Route 81 for Habikigaoka-nishi Gochome via Karusato and Habikiyama Jutaku
  - Route 82 for Shitennoji University via Karusato and Habikiyama Jutaku

Habikino Loop Bus - Furuichi-eki-suji (along Japan National Route 170)

== History ==
Furuichi Station opened on March 24, 1898.

== Passenger statistics ==
In fiscal 2018, the station was used by an average of 20,937 passengers daily.

== Surrounding area ==
- Furuichi Depot
- Habikino City Hall
- Habikino Police Station
- Konda Hachimangu
- Tomb of Yamato Takeru no Mikoto
- Shiratori Jinja Shrine
- Kintetsu Plaza

== See also ==
- List of railway stations in Japan
