= Kawachinagano Station =

Railway station in Kawachinagano, Osaka Prefecture, Japan

Kawachinagano Station 河内長野駅
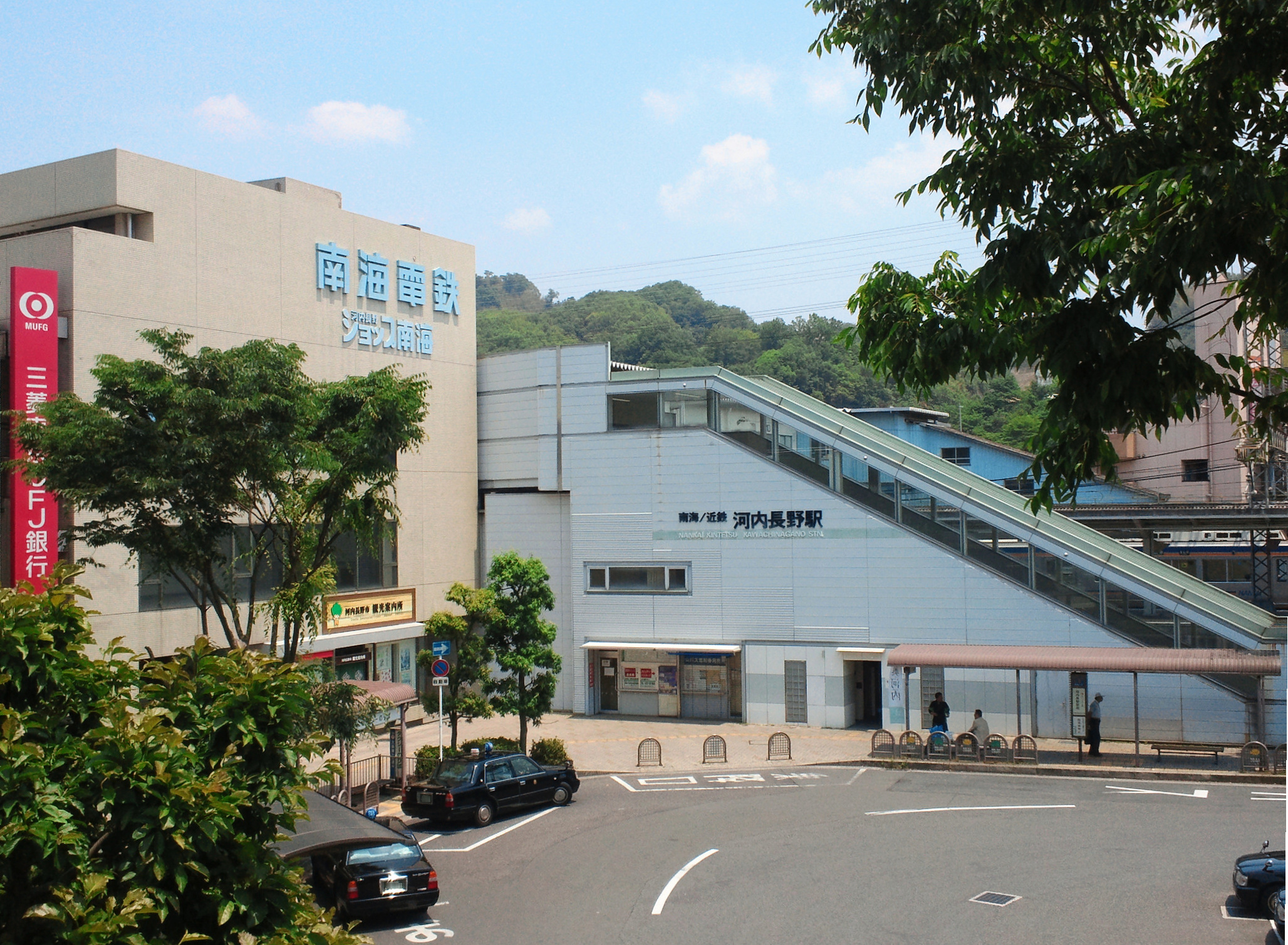
- Station building

General information
- Location: Hommachi, Kawachinagan-shio, Osaka-fu 586-0015; Japan
- Coordinates: 34°27′3.99″N 135°34′23.15″E
- Operator: Nankai Electric Railway; Kintetsu Railway
- Lines: Koya Line; Nagano Line
Track layout
Location
- Location within Osaka Prefecture Location within Japan

Kawachinagano Station (河内長野駅, Kawachi-Nagano-eki; Kawachinagano (Nankai) or Kawachi-Nagano (Kintetsu)) is an interchange passenger railway station located in the city of Kawachinagano, Osaka Prefecture, Japan, jointly operated by the private railway operators Kintetsu Railway and Nankai Electric Railway.

== Lines ==
The station is served by the Nankai Kōya Line and is 28.0 km from the terminus of the line at Shiomibashi. The station is also served by the Kintetsu Nagano Line and is 12.5 km from the terminus of that line at Furuichi.

== Nankai Railway Koya Line ==
Kawachinagano Station 河内長野駅

General information
- Location: 29-9, Hommachi, Kawachinagano-shi, Osaka-fu 586-0015; Japan
- System: Nankai Railway station
- Operator: Nankai Electric Railway
- Line: Koya Line
- Distance: 28.0 km (17.4 mi) from Shiomibashi
- Platforms: 2 island platforms

Other information
- Station code: NK69

History
- Opened: March 29, 1898
- Former names: Nagano (until 1954)

Passengers
- FY2019: 26,916 daily
Location

=== Layout ===
- Nankai station has two island platforms serving four tracks on the ground.

1	■ Kōya Line	for Kōyasan
2	■ Kōya Line	for Kōyasan returning for Namba
3, 4	■ Kōya Line	for Namba

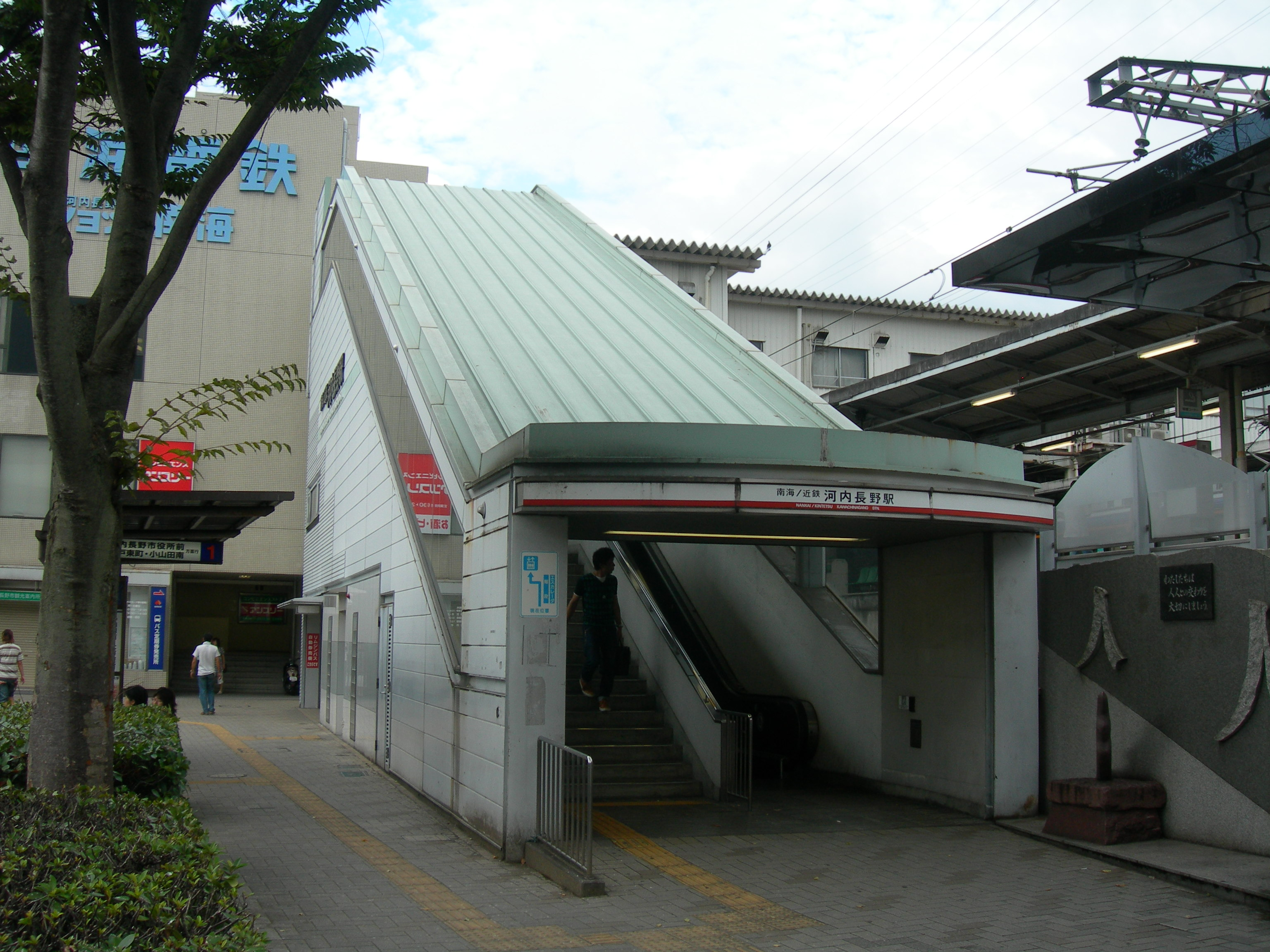
West exit

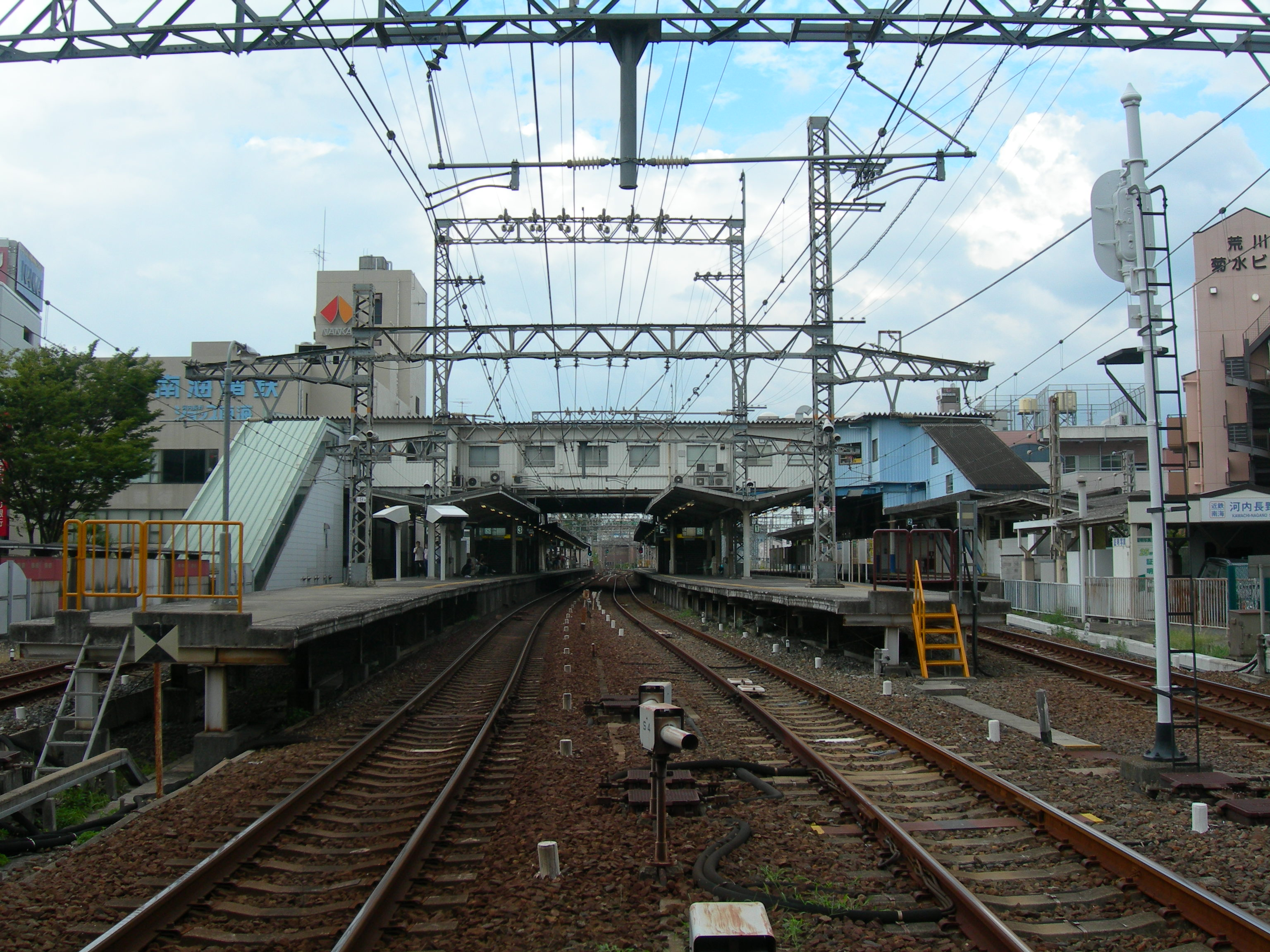
Platform

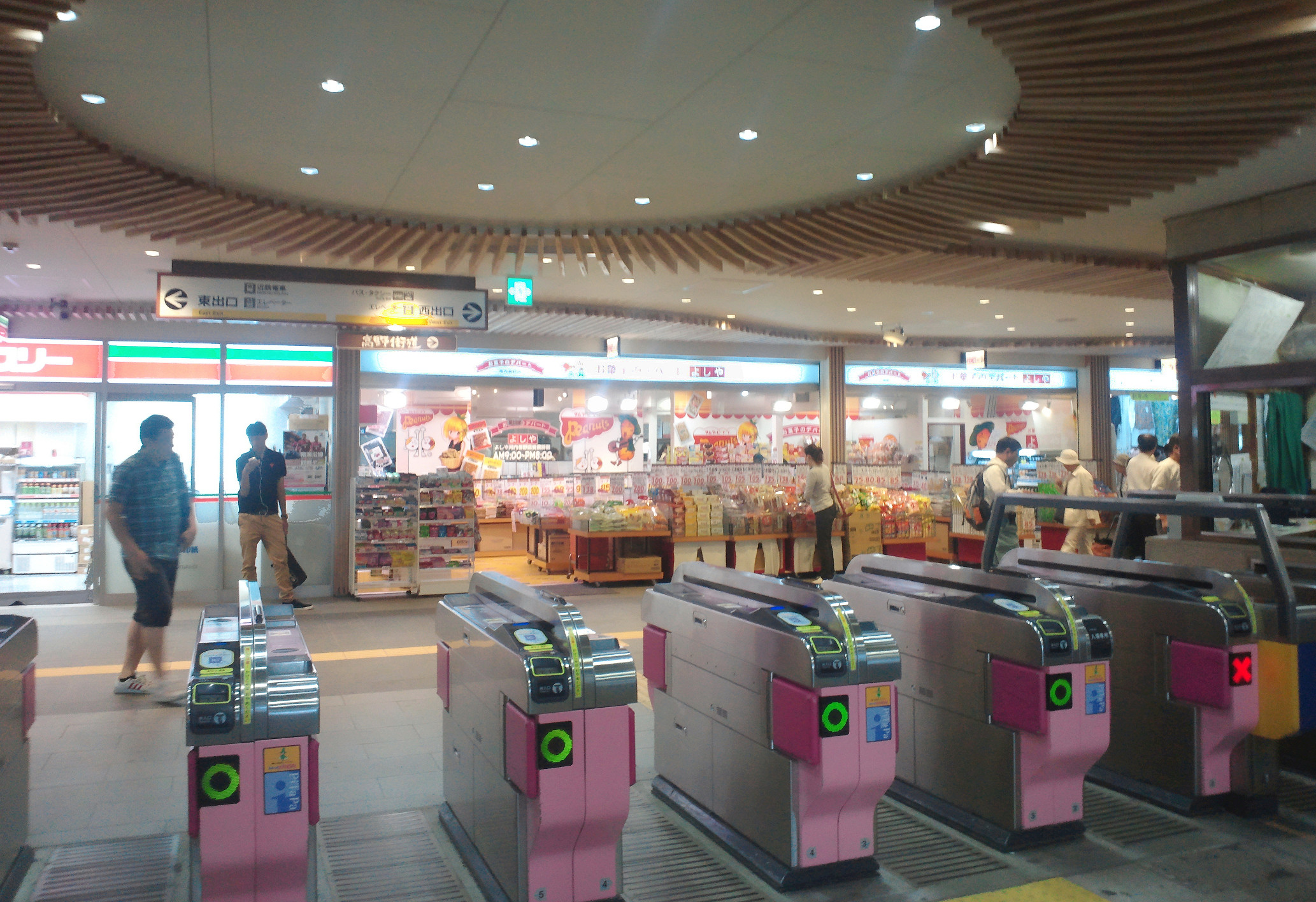
Ticket gates

=== Adjacent stations ===
«	Service	»
Koya Line (NK69)
Chiyoda (NK68)	Local (各駅停車)	Mikkaichichō (NK70)
Chiyoda (NK68)	Semi-Express	Mikkaichichō (NK70)
Chiyoda (NK68)	Sub Express	Mikkaichichō (NK70)
Kongō (NK66)	Express	Mikkaichichō (NK70)
Kongō (NK66)	Rapid Express	Mikkaichichō (NK70)
Kongō (NK66)	Limited Express "Koya", "Rinkan"	Rinkanden'entoshi (NK75)

== Kintetsu Nagano Line ==
Kawachi-Nagano Station 河内長野駅
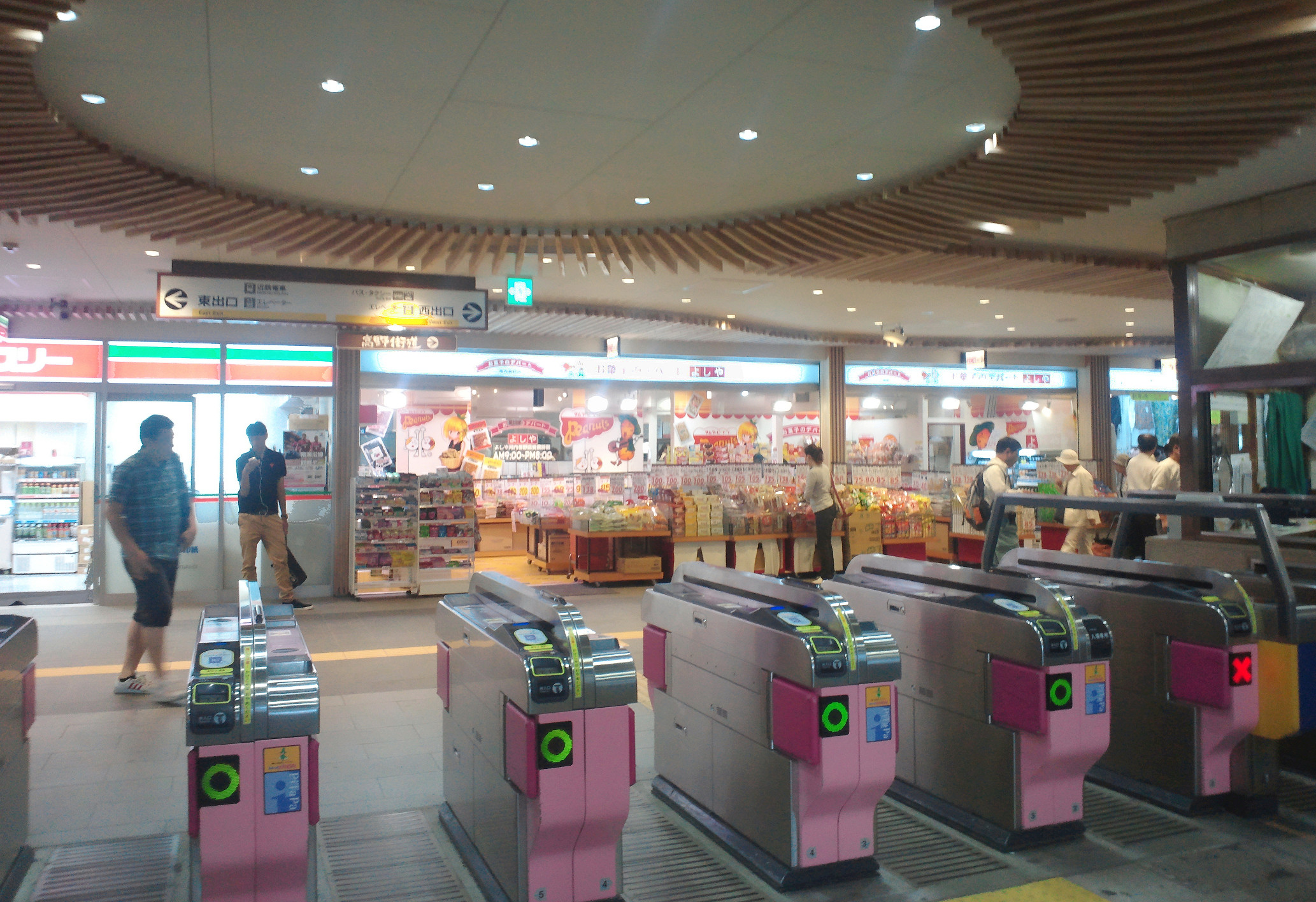
- Ticket barrier in Kawachi-Nagano Station

General information
- Location: 29-1, Hommachi, Kawachinagano-shi, Osaka-fu 586-0015; Japan
- System: Kintetsu station
- Operator: Kintetsu Railway
- Line: Nagano Line
- Distance: 12.5 km (7.8 mi) from Furuichi
- Platforms: 1 island platform

Other information
- Station code: O23

History
- Opened: December 12, 1902
- Former names: Nagano (until 1954)

Passengers
- FY2019: 7,001 daily
Location

=== Layout ===
Kintetsu station has an island platform serving two tracks on the ground; however, all trains arrive at and depart from Track 2. Track 1 is unused by revenue trains (though it is sometimes used to park track maintenance equipment), and has neither a departure signal nor overhead catenary. Much of the track-space has been cannibalized for the use of stairs and elevator to the concourse above the platform.

1	■ not used	
2	■ Nagano Line	for Furuichi and Ōsaka Abenobashi

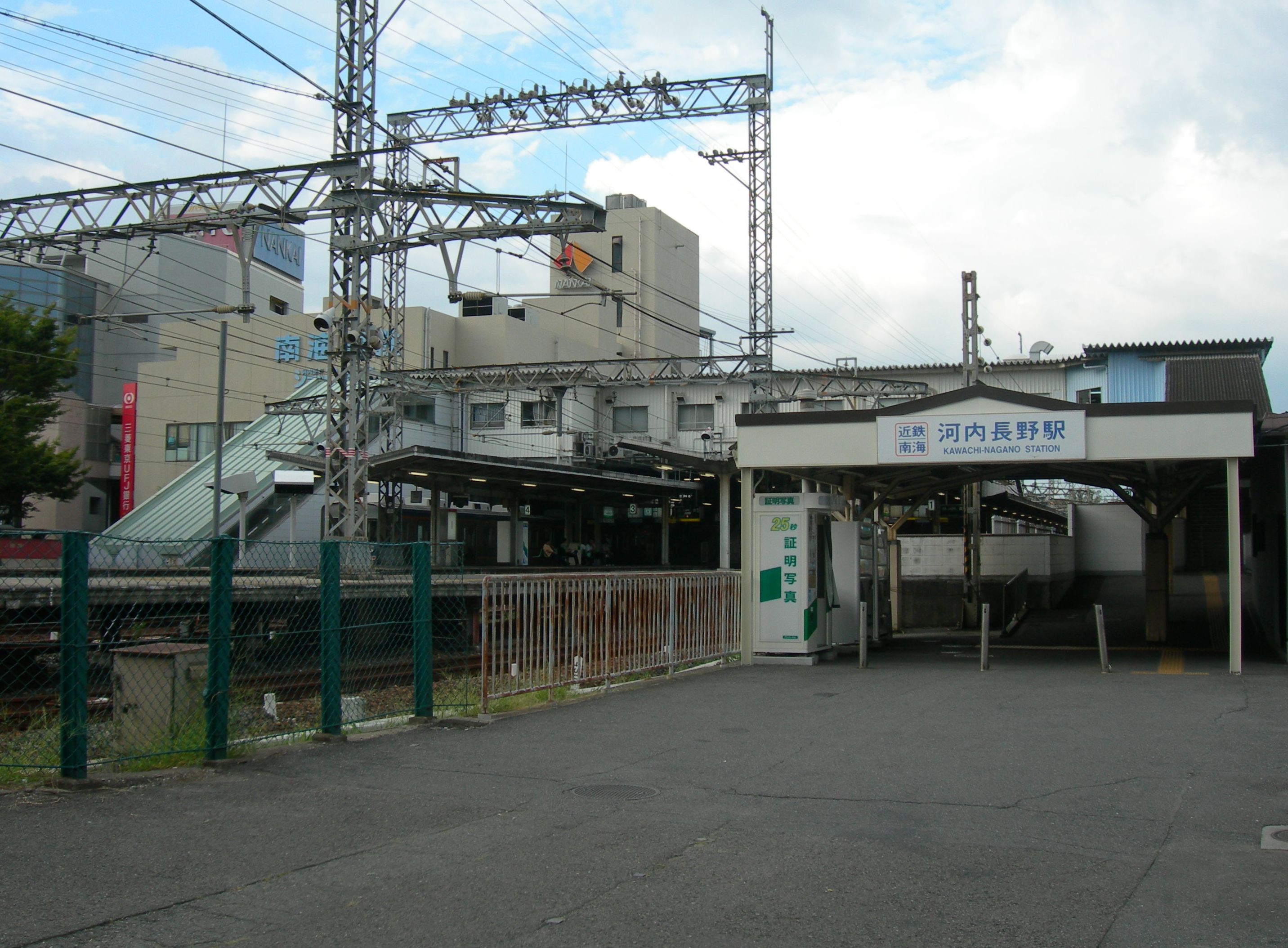
East exit

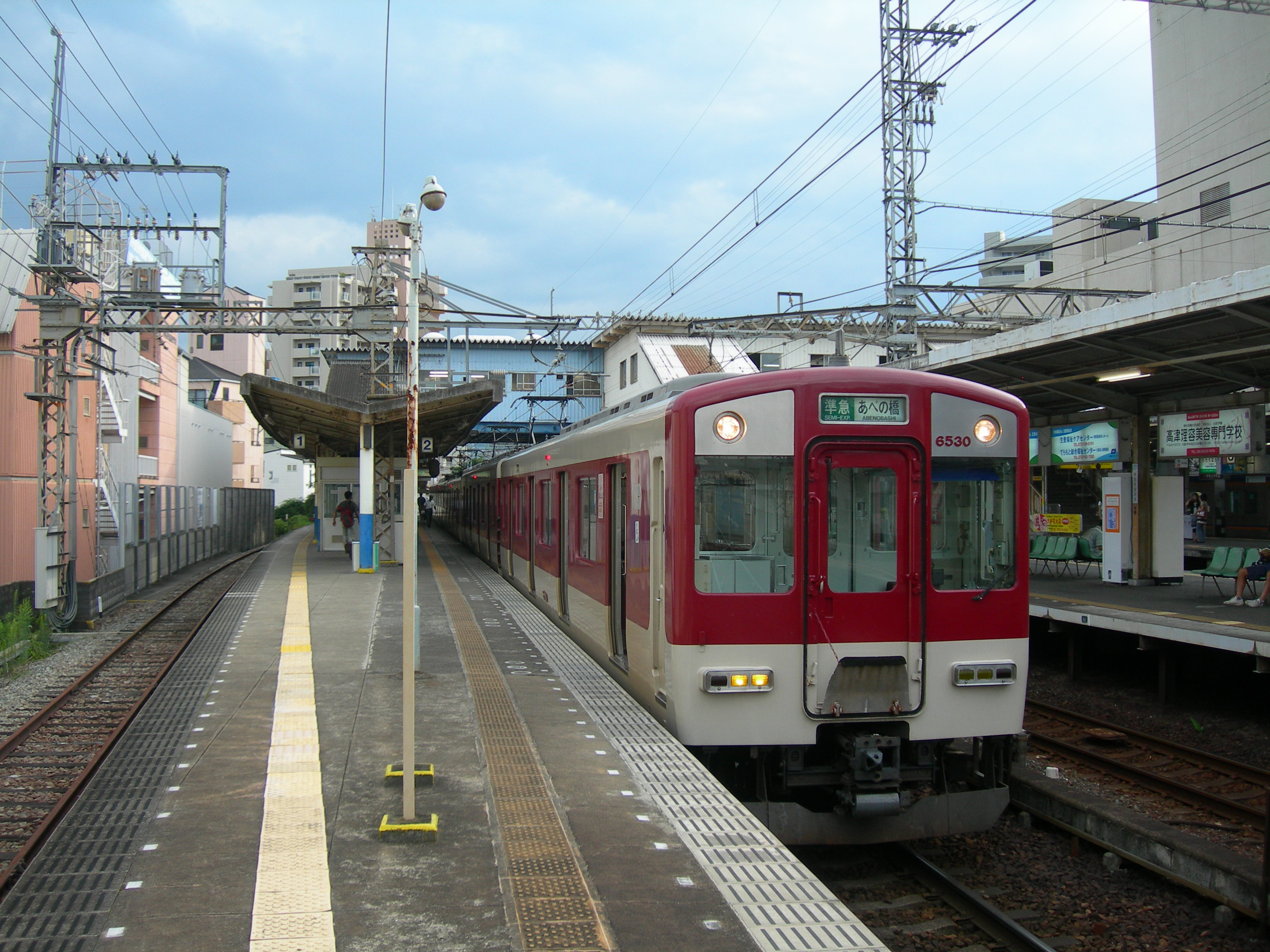
Platform

=== Adjacent station ===
«	Service	»
Nagano Line (O23)
Shionomiya (O22)	Semi-Express	Terminus
Shionomiya (O22)	Local	Terminus
Shionomiya (O22)	Express	Terminus

== Passenger statistics ==
In fiscal 2019, the Nankai portion of the station was used by an average of 26,916 passengers daily. The Kintetsu portion of the station was used by 7,001 passengers daily (boarding passengers only)

== Surrounding area ==
=== Public facilities ===
- Kawachinagano City Hall (1 km from the station)
- Lovely Hall
- Kawachinagano Police Station (Osaka Prefectural Police)
- Kawachinagano Fire Station (Kawachinagano City Fire Department)

=== Market facilities ===
- Izumiya

=== Financial institutes ===
- Japan Post Group
  - Kawachinagano Post Office
- bank, etc.
  - The Bank of Tokyo-Mitsubishi UFJ Kawachinagano Branch
  - Sumitomo Mitsui Banking Corporation Kawachinagano Branch
  - Kiyo Bank Kawachinagano Branch
  - Nanto Bank Kawachinagano Branch
  - Seikyo Shin'yo Kumiai Kawachinagano Branch

== See also ==
- List of railway stations in Japan
