= Yamato-Shinjō Station =

Railway station in Katsuragi, Nara Prefecture, Japan

Yamato-Shinjō Station 大和新庄駅
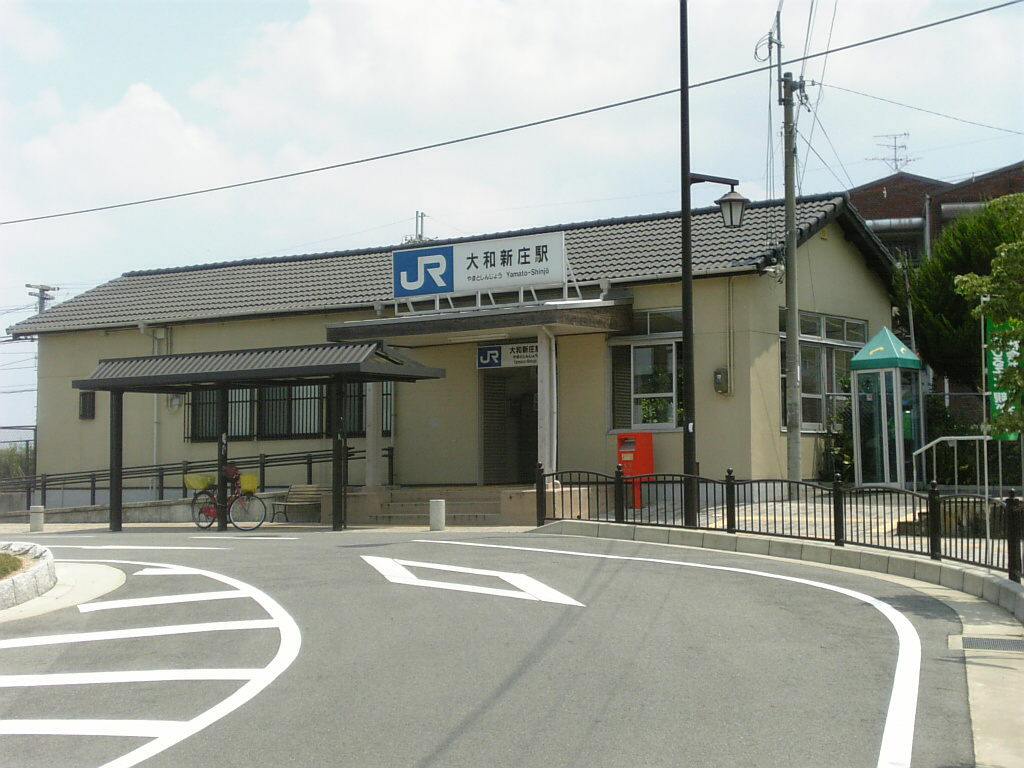
- Yamato-Shinjō Station

General information
- Location: 676-1, Kitahanauchi, Katsuragi-shi, Nara-ken 639-2113; Japan
- Coordinates: 34°29′19″N 135°44′09″E
- System: JR-West commuter rail station
- Owner: West Japan Railway Company
- Operator: West Japan Railway Company
- Line: T Wakayama Line
- Distance: 14.9 km (9.3 miles) from Ōji
- Platforms: 1 side platform
- Tracks: 1
- Train operators: West Japan Railway Company
- Bus stands: 1
- Connections: Katsuragi City Community Bus Renka-chan-gō Loop Route・Kehaya-gō Fuedō—Hajikami Route; Nara Kotsu Bus Lines 60・62・70・76・161・Tokkyu (Limited Express) at Shinjō

Construction
- Structure type: At grade
- Parking: None
- Cycle facilities: Available
- Accessible: No

Other information
- Website: http://www.jr-odekake.net/eki/top.php?id=0621806

History
- Opened: 10 May 1896
- Former names: Shinjō (1896—1915)

Passengers
- 2022: 425 daily

Services
Preceding station	JR West	Following station
Takada towards Ōji	Wakayama Line Local	Gose towards Wakayama
Location

Yamato-Shinjō Station (大和新庄駅, Yamato-shinjō-eki) is a passenger railway station in located in the city of Katsuragi, Nara Prefecture, Japan, operated by West Japan Railway Company (JR West).

== Lines ==
Yamato-Shinjō Station is served by the Wakayama Line, and is located 14.9 kilometers from the terminus of the line at Ōji.

== Station layout ==
The station is an above-ground station with one side platform and is connected to a small station building by a footbridge. The station is staffed.

== History ==
Yamato-Shinjō Station opened as Shinjō Station (新庄駅) on 10 May 1894 on the Nanwa Railway . The Nanwa Railway was taken over by the Kansai Railway on 9 December 1904, which was then nationalized on 1 October 1907. The station name was changed to its present name on 11 September 1915. With the privatization of the Japan National Railways (JNR) on April 1, 1987, the station came under the aegis of the West Japan Railway Company.

== Passenger statistics ==
In fiscal 2022, the station was used by an average of 312 passengers daily (boarding passengers only).

== Surrounding Area ==
- Japan National Route 24
- Kintetsu Shinjō Station (Kintetsu Gose Line)

== See also ==
- List of railway stations in Japan
