= Katsuraki Hitokotonushi Shrine =

Coordinates: 34°28′18″N 135°42′36″E

- 葛木坐火雷神社
- Main hall

Religion
- Affiliation: Shinto
- Prefecture: Nara Prefecture
- Region: Kansai
- Deity: Yakusanoikazuchi

Location
- Location: 448 Fuefuki, Katsuragi 639-2132
- Country: Japan
- Interactive map of Katsuraki Hitokotonushi Shrine
- Prefecture: Nara Prefecture

Website
- http://fuefukijinja.org/index.html

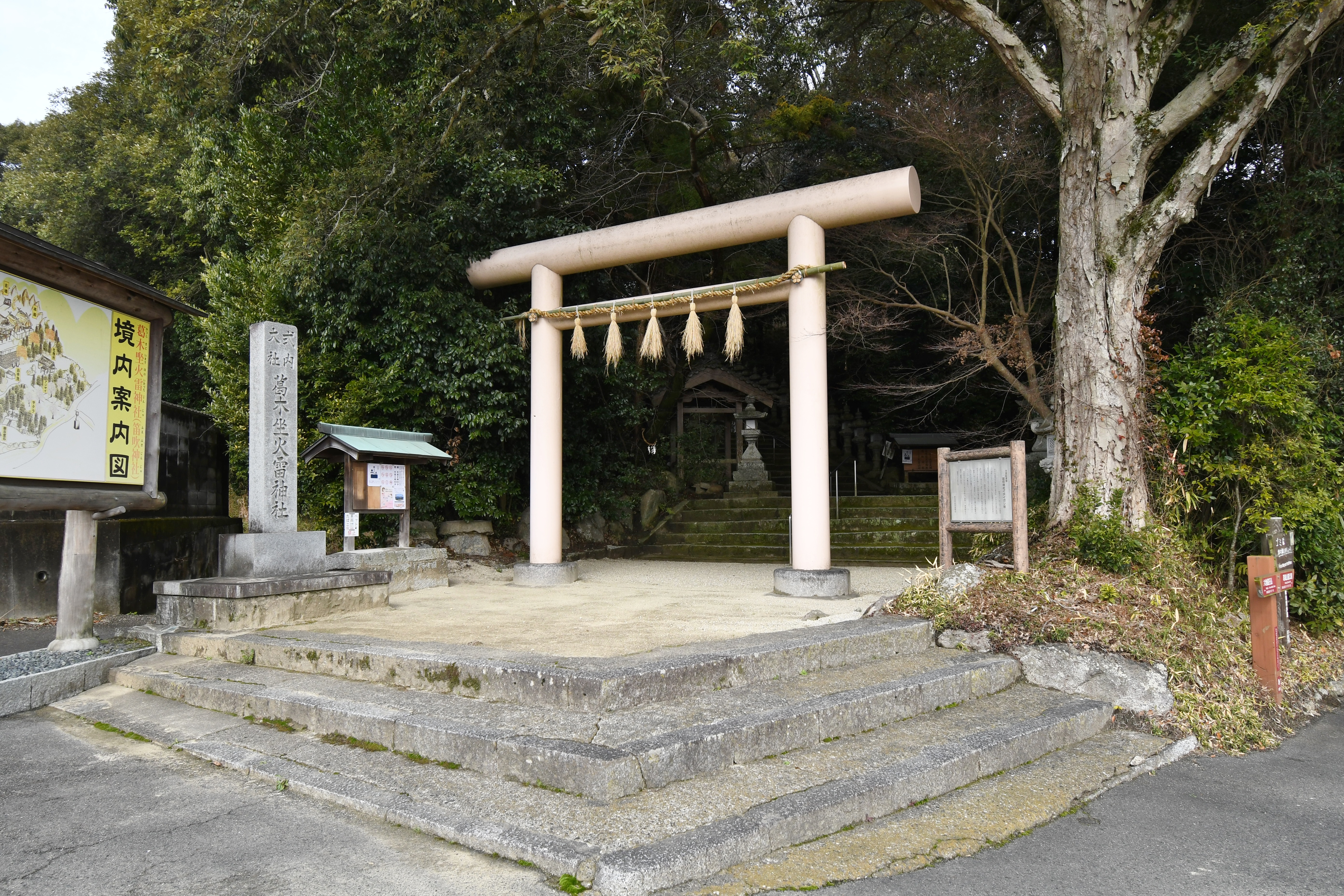
Torii

Katsuraki Hitokotonushi Shrine（葛木坐火雷神社, Katsuraki ni Imasu Honoikazuchi-jinja）is a Shinto shrine in Fuefuki, Katsuragi City, Nara Prefecture, Japan. Locally, it is commonly known as "Fuefuki Shrine".

== Deities shrined ==
It enshrines the deities Yakusanoikazuchi and a local deity, Amakayama no Mikoto (天香山命), the god of flutes and music.

== History ==
=== Overview ===
It is unknown when the shrine was constructed. It is said that it was founded during the reign of Emperor Jinmu, but the details are unclear.

== Precincts ==
On the temple grounds stands a Russian-made cannon donated by the government after the Russo-Japanese War.

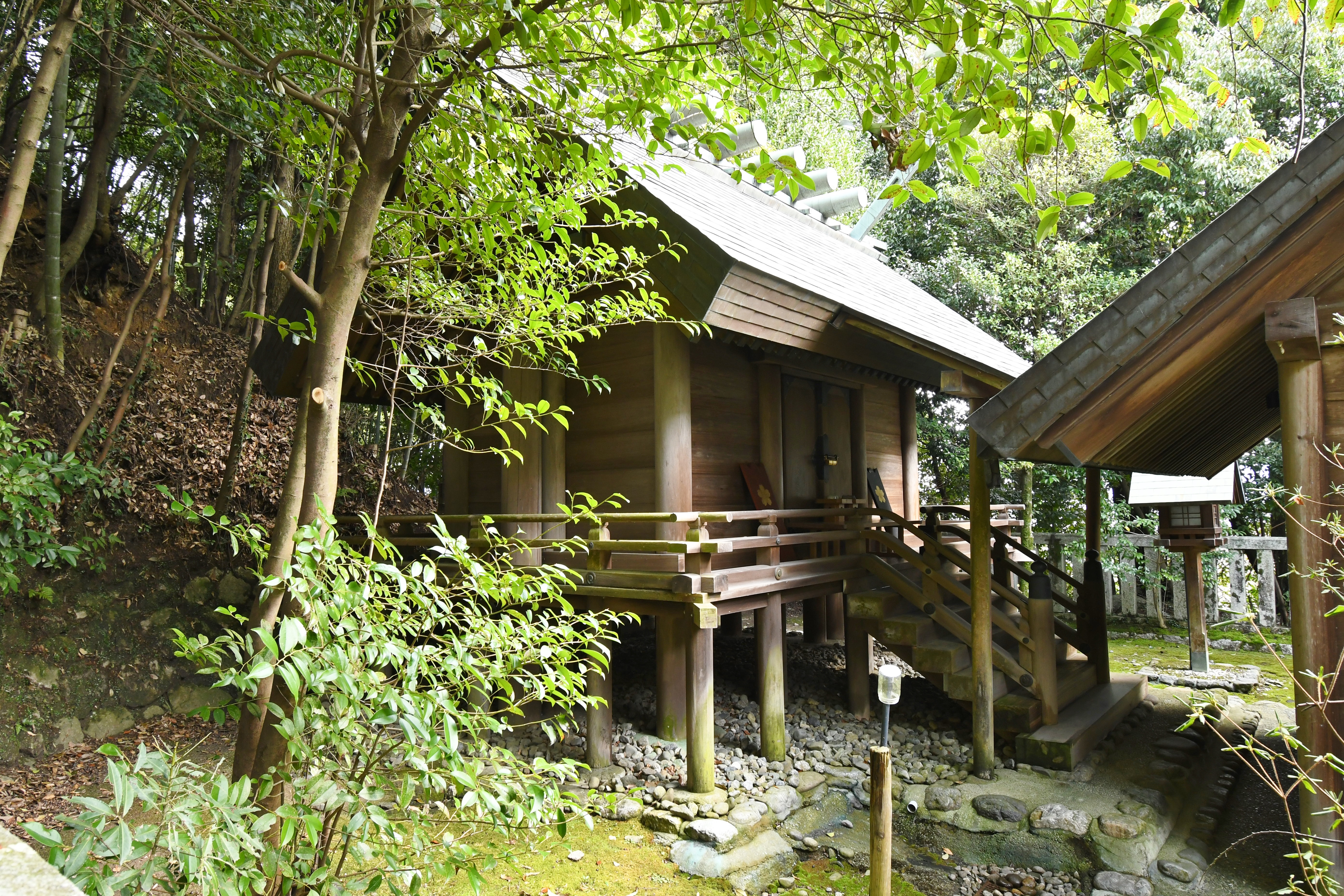
Honden

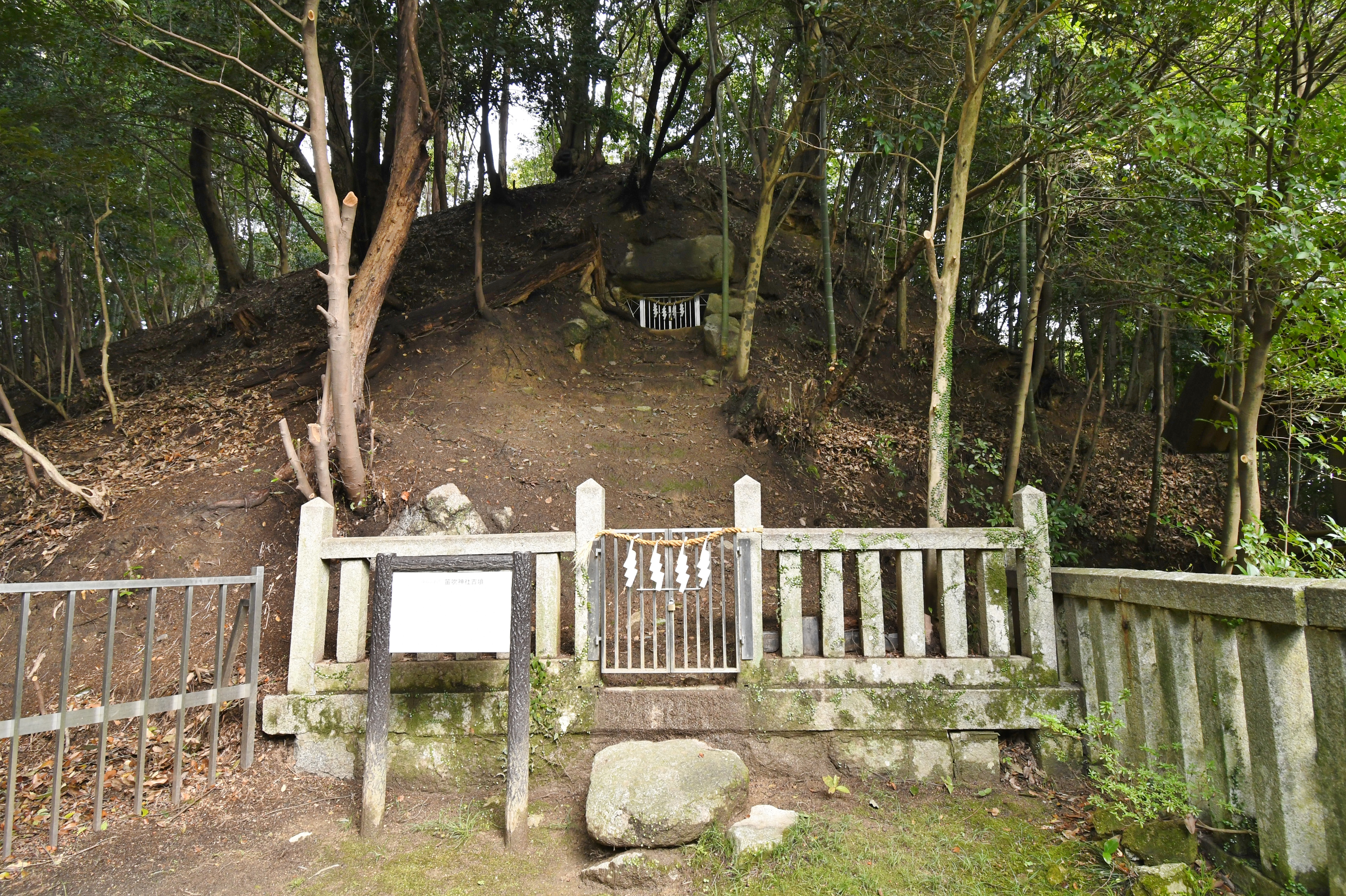
The Fuefuki Shrine Tomb behind the Honden

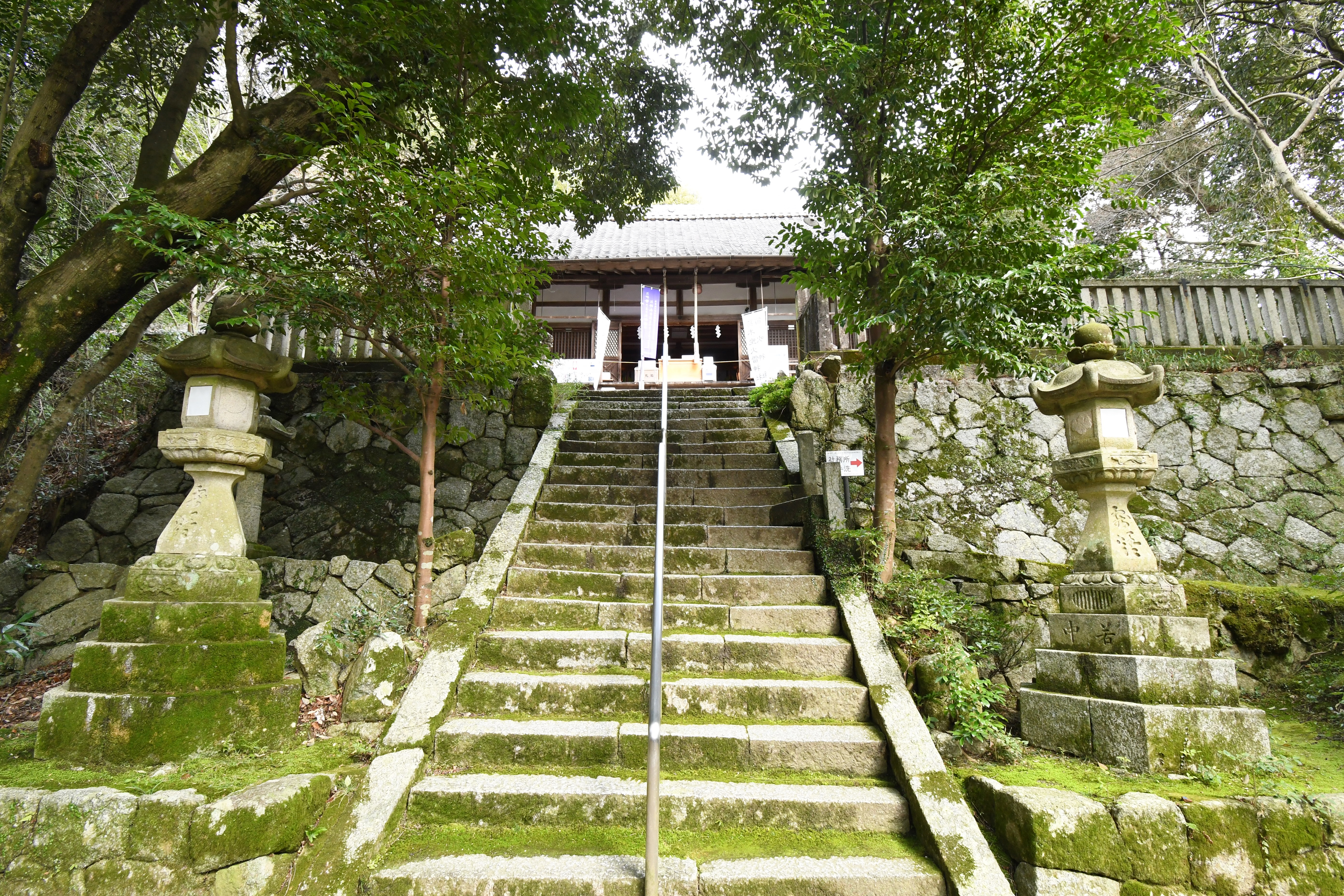
Entrance to the Honden

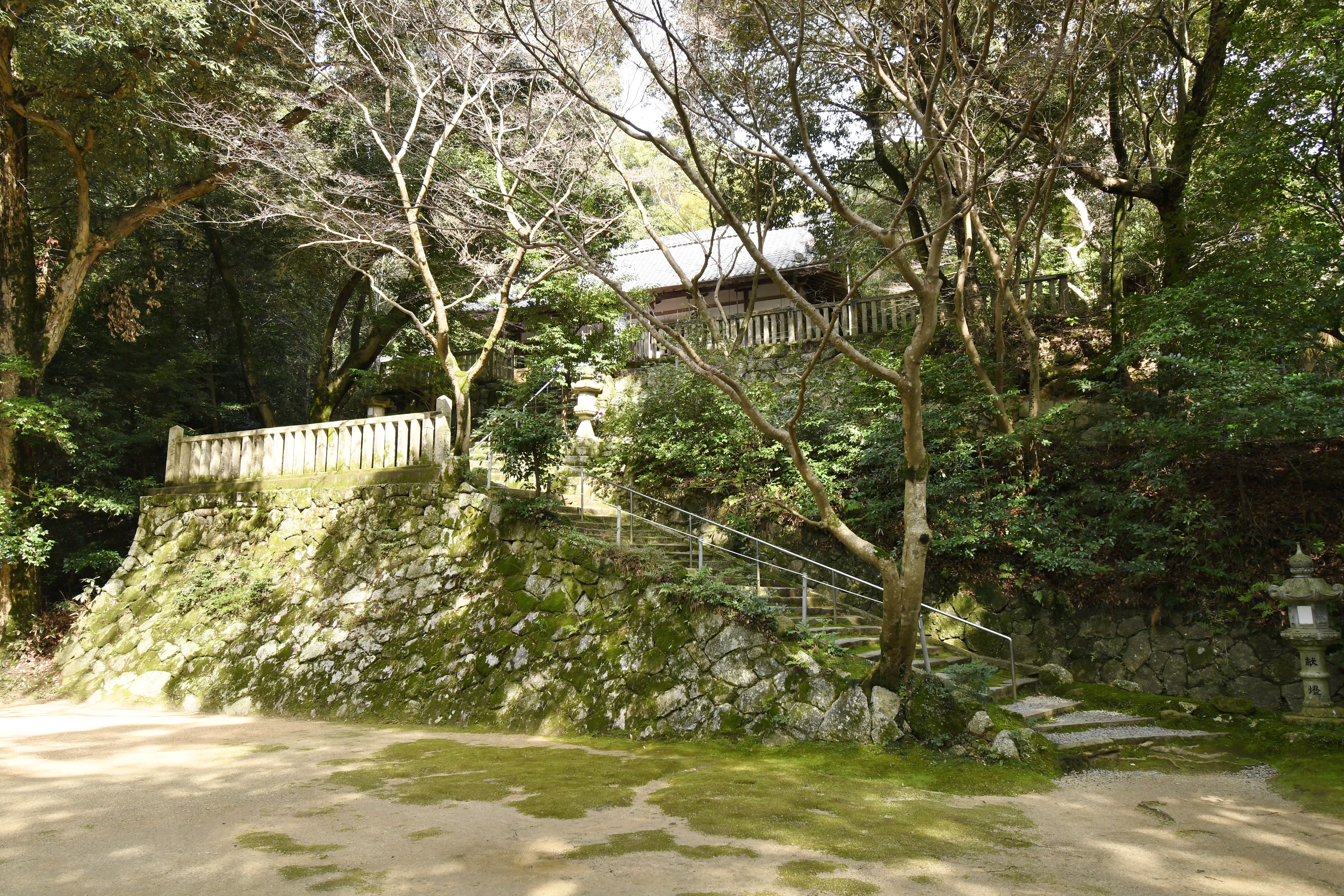
Temple grounds

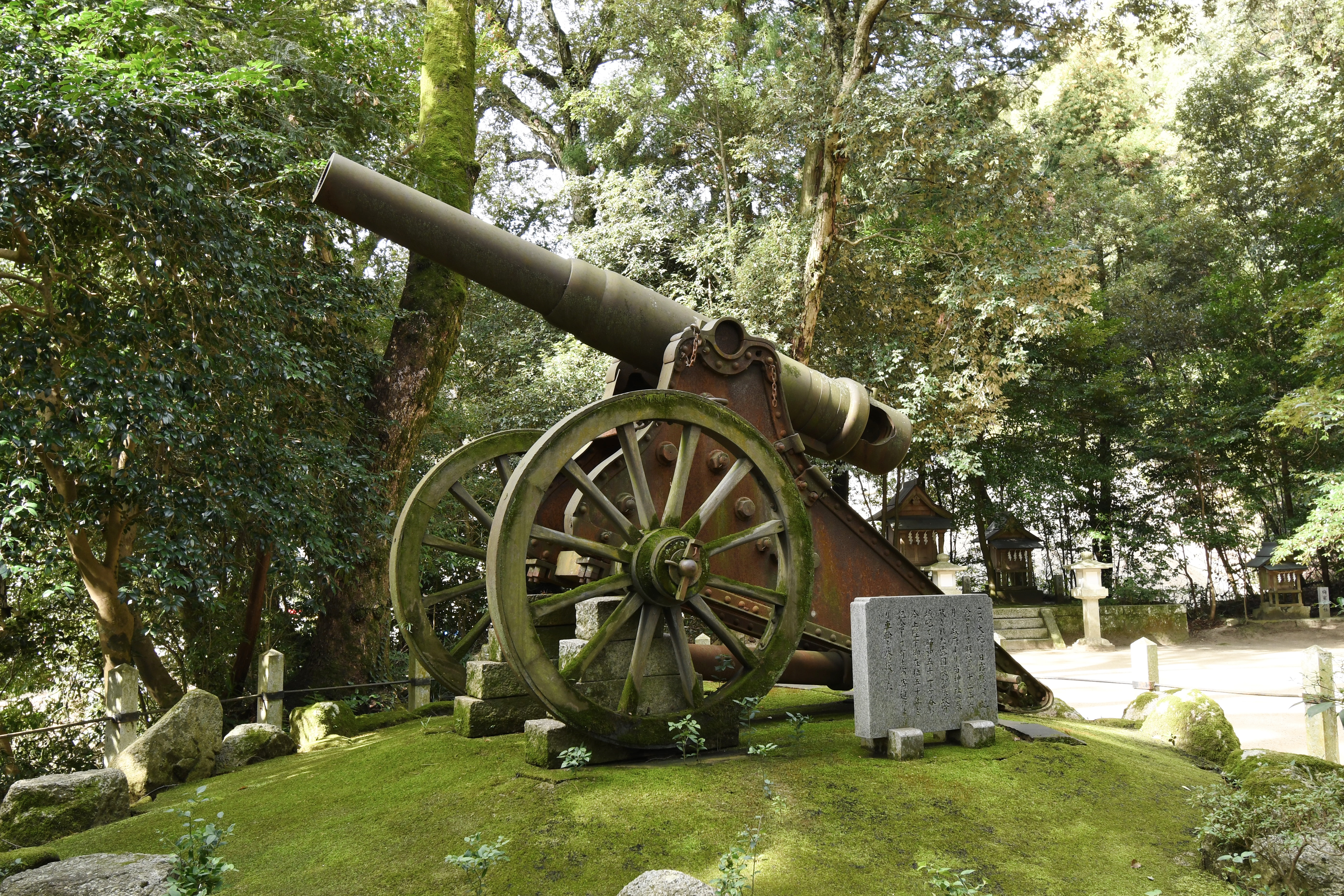
Russian-made cannon in the precincts

== Festivals ==
- Otaue Festival
  - February 11
  - An early spring festival heralding the arrival of spring in Katsuragi.
  - After the Harvest Prayer Ceremony is held in the main hall, the Otaue or Rice Planting Festival is performed in the large courtyard. During the ceremony, participants perform gestures mimicking the act of planting rice. This is followed by a rice-cake tossing ceremony.
- Nagoe Festival
  - July 17
  - Parishioners carrying twelve lanterns pay their respects while singing and playing the Ise Ondo. There are numerous lanterns lined up in the spacious courtyard.
  - The "Katsuragi Taiko Preservation Society" does a dedication performance among other events.
- Chinka Festival
  - November 15
  - A Shinto ritual is held in accordance with ancient tradition, during which a fire is lit using a fire-striker to express gratitude for the fire and pray for fire safety.
