= Iwaki Station =

Iwaki Station may refer to:

- Iwaki Station (Fukushima)
- Iwaki Station (Nara)
