= Oshimi Station =

Railway station in Katsuragi, Nara Prefecture, Japan

Oshimi Station 忍海駅
- Oshimi Station, August 2026

General information
- Location: 342-2, Oshimi, Katsuragi-shi, Nara-ken 639-2123; Japan
- Coordinates: 34°28′34.8″N 135°43′55.24″E
- System: Kintetsu Railway commuter rail station
- Owner: Kintetsu Railway
- Operator: Kintetsu Railway
- Line: P Gose Line
- Distance: 3.9 km (2.4 miles) from Shakudo
- Platforms: 1 side platform
- Tracks: 1
- Train operators: Kintetsu Railway
- Connections: Bus terminal

Construction
- Cycle facilities: Available
- Accessible: Yes

Other information
- Station code: P25
- Website: www.kintetsu.co.jp/station/station_info/station15007.html

History
- Opened: 9 December 1930

Passengers
- FY2019: 767 daily

Services
Preceding station	Kintetsu Railway	Following station
Kintetsu Shinjō towards Shakudo	Gose Line Local Semi-Express	Kintetsu Gose Terminus
Location

Oshimi Station (忍海駅, Oshimi-eki) is a passenger railway station located in the city of Katsuragi, Nara Prefecture, Japan. It is operated by the private transportation company, Kintetsu Railway.

== Line ==
Oshimi Station is served by the Gose Line and is 3.9 kilometers from the starting point of the line at Shakudo.

== Layout ==
The station is an above-ground station with one single side platform. The effective length of the platform is four cars. The station is unattended.

Ticket gates

Platform

Signage

== Platforms ==
1	■ P Gose Line	for Kintetsu Gose for Shakudo

== History ==
Oshimi Station was opened 9 December 1930 on the Nanwa Electric Railway. It became a Kansai Express Railway station due to a company merger on 1 April 1944, and through a subsequent merger became a station on the Kintetsu Railway on 1 June 1944. The station was relocated 96 meters south to its present location on 17 September 1984.

== Passenger statistics ==
In fiscal 2019 the station was used by an average of 767 passengers daily (boarding passengers only).

== Surrounding area ==
- Tsunozashi Shrine
- Katsuragi City History Museum
- Katsuragi City Oshimi Elementary School

== See also ==
- List of railway stations in Japan
