= Tamade =

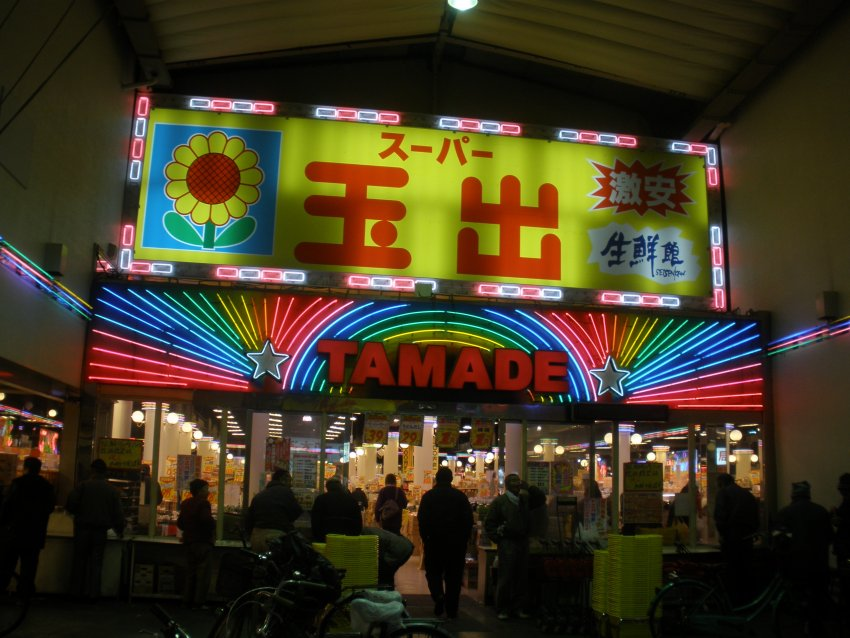
Tamade supermarket chain

Tamade may refer to:

- Tamade Station, the name of two train stations in Japan.
  - Tamade Station (Nara) (玉手駅)
  - Tamade Station (Osaka) (玉出駅)
- Tamade (玉出), a supermarket chain in Japan
- "Tāmāde" (他媽的), a commonly used vulgar word in Chinese.
