= Tamade Station =

Tamade Station may refer to:

- Tamade Station (Osaka), a subway station in Nishinari-ku, Osaka, Japan
- Tamade Station (Nara), a railway station in Gose, Nara, Japan
