= Shinjō, Nara =

Dissolved municipality in Nara prefecture, Japan

Shinjō (新庄町, Shinjō-chō) was a town located in Kitakatsuragi District, Nara Prefecture, Japan.

On October 1, 2004, Shinjō, along with the town of Taima (also from Kitakatsuragi District), was merged to create the city of Katsuragi.
