= Kintetsu Shinjō Station =

Railway station in Katsuragi, Nara Prefecture, Japan

Kintetsu Shinjō Station 近鉄新庄駅
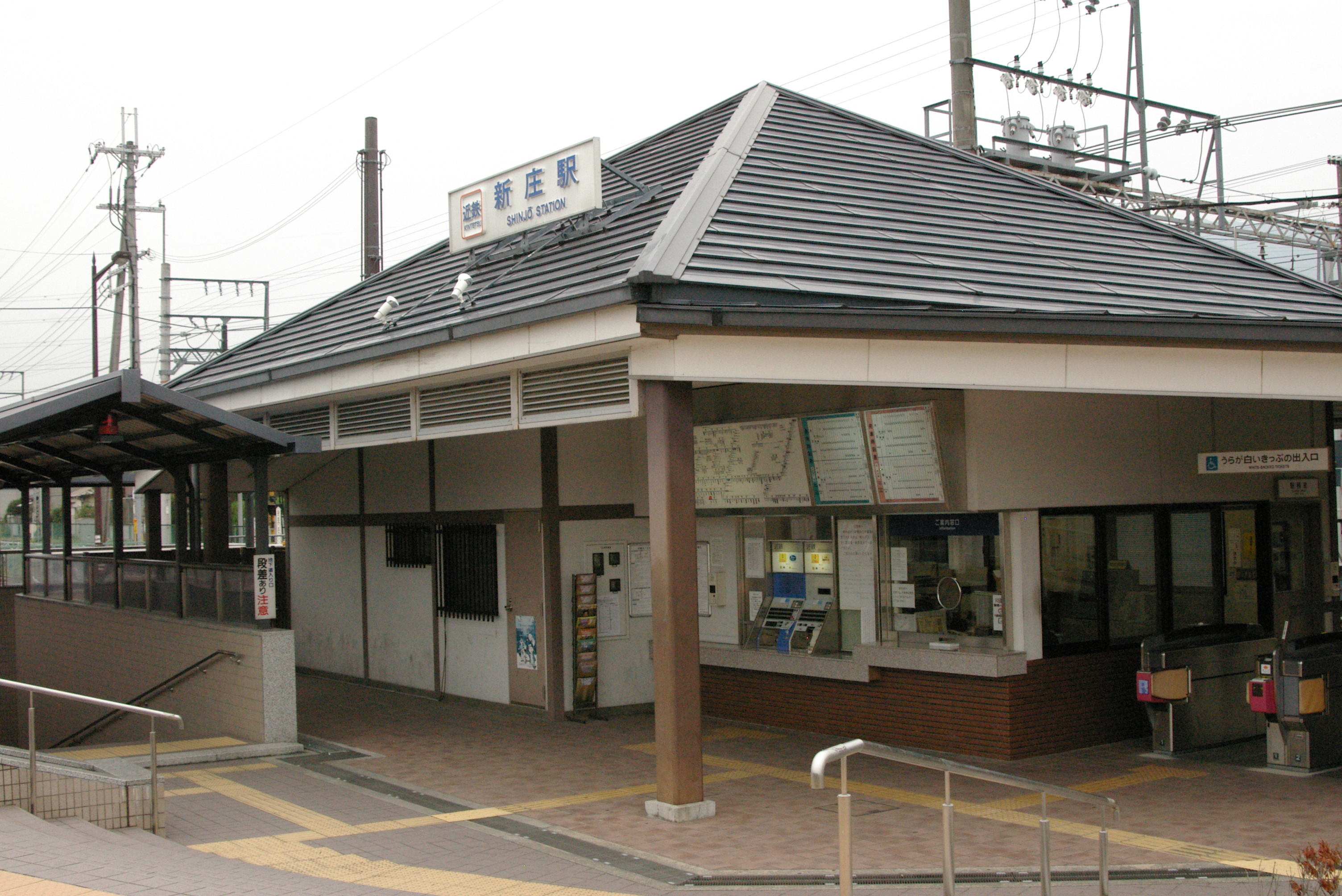
- Kintetsu Shinjō Station

General information
- Location: 157-4, Kakinomoto, Katsuragi-shi, Nara-ken 639-2111; Japan
- Coordinates: 34°29′19.62″N 135°43′38.92″E
- System: Kintetsu Railway commuter rail station
- Owner: Kintetsu Railway
- Operator: Kintetsu Railway
- Line: P Gose Line
- Distance: 2.4 km (1.5 miles) from Shakudo
- Platforms: 2 side platforms
- Tracks: 2
- Train operators: Kintetsu Railway
- Connections: Bus terminal

Construction
- Cycle facilities: Available
- Accessible: Yes

Other information
- Station code: P24
- Website: www.kintetsu.co.jp/station/station_info/station15006.html

History
- Opened: 9 December 1930
- Former names: Minamiwa Shinjō-chō (to 1944), Kinki Nippon Shinjo Station (to 1970)

Passengers
- FY2019: 1473 daily

Services
Preceding station	Kintetsu Railway	Following station
Shakudo Terminus	Gose Line Local Semi-Express	Oshimi towards Kintetsu Gose
Location

Kintetsu Shinjō Station (近鉄新庄駅, Kintetsu Shinjō-eki) is a passenger railway station located in the city of Katsuragi, Nara Prefecture, Japan. It is operated by the private transportation company, Kintetsu Railway.

== Line ==
Kintetsu Shinjō Station is served by the Gose Line and is 2.4 kilometers from the starting point of the line at Shakudo.

== Layout ==
The station is an above-ground station with two opposed side platforms and two tracks. Both the ticket gates and concourse are at ground level. The entrance and exit is at platform 1, and a level crossing connects to platform 2 on the opposite side. The effective length of the platform is long enough for four cars. The station is unattended.

== Platforms ==
1	■ P Gose Line	for Kintetsu Gose
2	■ P Gose Line	for Shakudo

== History ==
Kintetsu Shinjō Station was opened 9 December 1930 as Minamiwa Shinjō-chō Station (南和新庄町駅) on the Nanwa Electric Railway. It became a Kansai Express Railway station due to a company merger on 1 April 1944, and through a subsequent merger became a station on the Kintetsu Railway on 1 June 1944, becoming Kankyu Shinjō Station (関急新庄駅). It was renamed tKinki Nippon Shinjo Station (畿日本新庄駅) at that time. It renamed to its present name on 1 March 1970.

== Passenger statistics ==
In fiscal 2019 the station was used by an average of 1473 passengers daily (boarding passengers only).

== Surrounding area ==
- Katsuragi City Hall Shinjo Building
- Kakimoto Shrine

== See also ==
- List of railway stations in Japan
