= Wakigami Station =

Railway station in Gose, Nara Prefecture, Japan

Wakigami Station 掖上駅
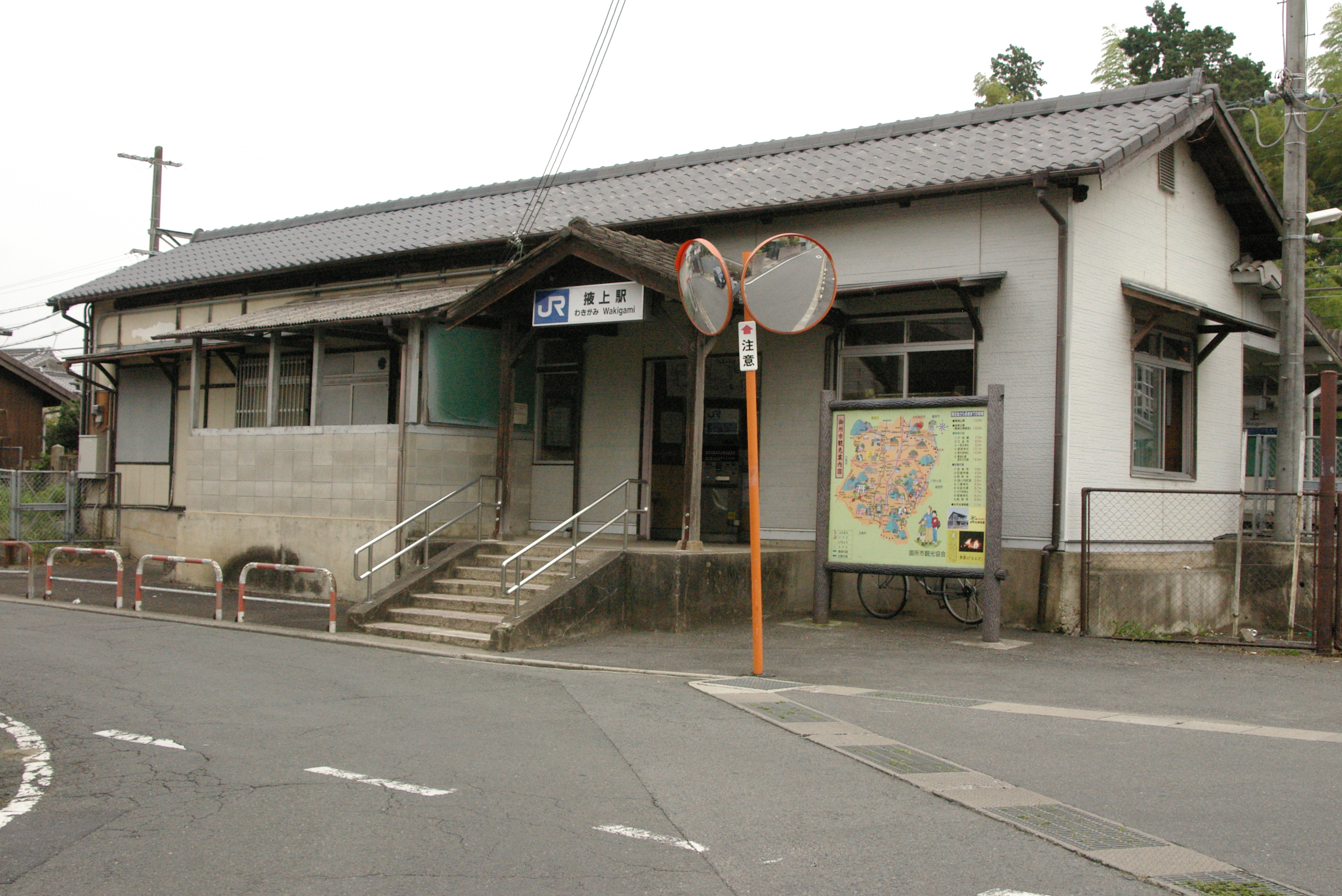
- Wakigami Station—September 2008

General information
- Location: 146, Ōaza Kashihara, Gose-shi, Nara-ken 639-2244; Japan
- Coordinates: 34°27′08″N 135°45′48″E
- System: JR-West commuter rail station
- Owner: West Japan Railway Company
- Operator: West Japan Railway Company
- Line: T Wakayama Line
- Distance: 20.9 km (13.0 miles) from Ōji
- Platforms: 2 side platforms
- Tracks: 2
- Train operators: West Japan Railway Company
- Bus stands: 1
- Connections: Gose City Community Bus Himawari-gō East Course

Construction
- Structure type: At grade
- Parking: None
- Cycle facilities: Available

Other information
- Website: http://www.jr-odekake.net/eki/top.php?id=0621808

History
- Opened: 25 October 1896
- Electrified: 1980
- Former names: Yakugami (to 1903); Tsubosaki (to 1940)

Passengers
- 2019: 119 daily
Services
Preceding station	JR-West	Following station
T Wakayama Line
Yoshinoguchi	Local	Tamade
Yoshinoguchi	Regional Rapid Service	Tamade; One-way
Yoshinoguchi; One-way	Rapid Service (through to the Yamatoji Line)	Tamade
Yoshinoguchi	Yamatoji Rapid Service	Tamade
Location

Wakigami Station (掖上駅, Wakigami-eki) is a passenger railway station in located in the city of Gose, Nara Prefecture, Japan, operated by West Japan Railway Company (JR West).

== Lines ==
Wakigami Station is served by the Wakayama Line, and is located 20.9 kilometers from the terminus of the line at Ōji.

== Station layout ==
The station is an above-ground station with two side platforms and two tracks where trains can pass each other. The old wooden station building was located on the north side of the outbound platform, and a footbridge was used to access the inbound platform, but it was removed in 2020 when a new simplified station building was installed on the inbound platform. It is an unstaffed station.

=== Platforms ===
1	■ T Wakayama Line	for Takada, Gojō and Hashimoto
2	■ T Wakayama Line	for Takada and Ōji

== History ==
Wakigami Station opened as a signal stop on 10 May 1896 as Yakugami Station (掖上駅) on the Nawa Railway. It was renamed Tsubosaki Station (壺阪駅) on 15 May 1903. The Nanwa Railway was absorbed by the Kansai Railway in 1904, which was nationalized in 1907. The station was renamed to its present name on 1 April 1940. With the privatization of the Japan National Railways (JNR) on April 1, 1987, the station came under the aegis of the West Japan Railway Company.

== Passenger statistics ==
In fiscal 2019, the station was used by an average of 129 passengers daily (boarding passengers only).

== Surrounding Area ==
The area around the station is a residential area.

== See also ==
- List of railway stations in Japan
