= Fuefuki Shrine Kofun =

- 笛吹神社古墳 (Japanese)
- Fuefuki Kofun Number 46
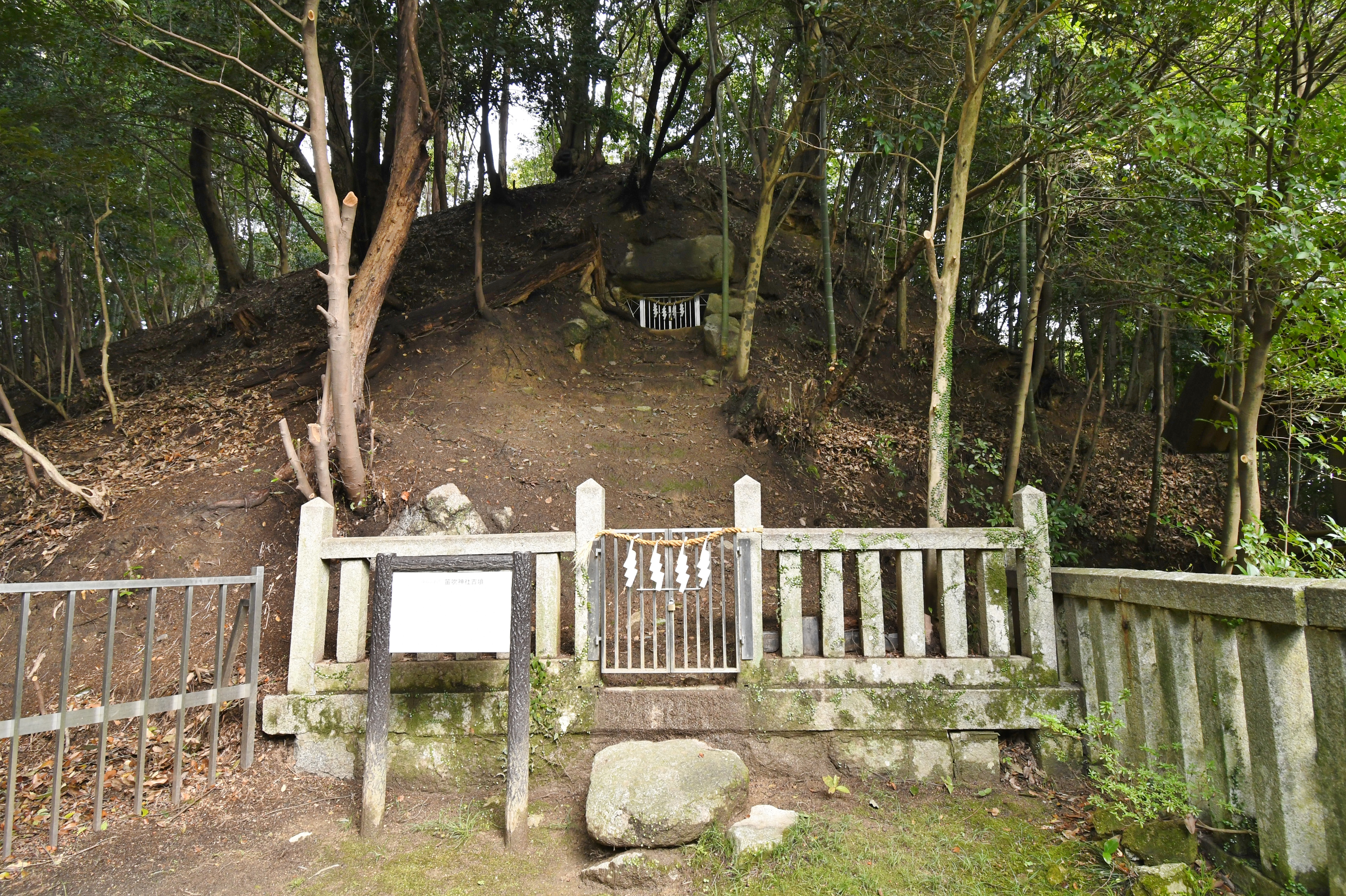
- Opening to the stone chamber at the top
- Interactive map of Fuefuki Shrine Kofun
- 34°28′18″N 135°42′36″E
- Type: Kofun
- Periods: Kofun Period
- Location: 448 Fuefuki, Katsuragi 639–2132, Nara Prefecture, Japan
- Region: Kansai

History
- Built: 6th Century

Site notes
- Excavation dates: 1987
- Public access: Partially

Fuefuki Shrine Kofun (笛吹神社古墳, Fuefuki Jinja Kofun) is a Kofun in Fuefuki, Katsuragi City, Nara Prefecture, Japan.

== Overview ==
Located on the eastern foothills of Mount Katsuragi, and behind the Honden within the grounds of the Katsuraki Hitokotonushi Shrine is a group of approximately 80 burial mounds, mainly dating to the mid-6th century during the Kofun Period.

The mound itself is circular, measuring roughly 25 meters east–west, 20 meters north–south, and about 4 meters in height. Its burial facility is a large horizontal stone chamber of the single side-chamber type, opening to the south, with a total length of approximately 12.5 meters. Constructed from massive granite blocks, the chamber contains a house-shaped stone coffin, regarded as an example of an early or archaic style. Although the Fuefuki Shrine Kofun has not been formally excavated, surveys conducted in 1987 on other mounds in the cluster revealed that most are small circular tombs with horizontal stone chambers, alongside a few keyhole-shaped mounds.

Goods reported from the cluster include iron swords, arrowheads, agricultural implements, beads, iron slag, and gilt-bronze ornaments, suggesting strong connections to iron production and metallurgy. This interpretation is reinforced by the proximity of the Wakita archaeological site, known for ironworking, and by possible links to immigrant-associated groups such as the Oshiumi clan.

The kofun area was designated a Nara Prefecture Historic Site in 1998 (Heisei 10). Nowadays, entry into the interior of the stone chamber is restricted.

== Cultural Property ==
The shrine has been designated as a Nara Prefecture cultural property. Its historic tomb was designated on 20 March 1998.

== See also ==
- List of Historic Sites of Japan (Nara)
