= Kitakatsuragi District, Nara =

District in Nara prefecture, Japan

Coordinates: 34.5659°N 135.728°E

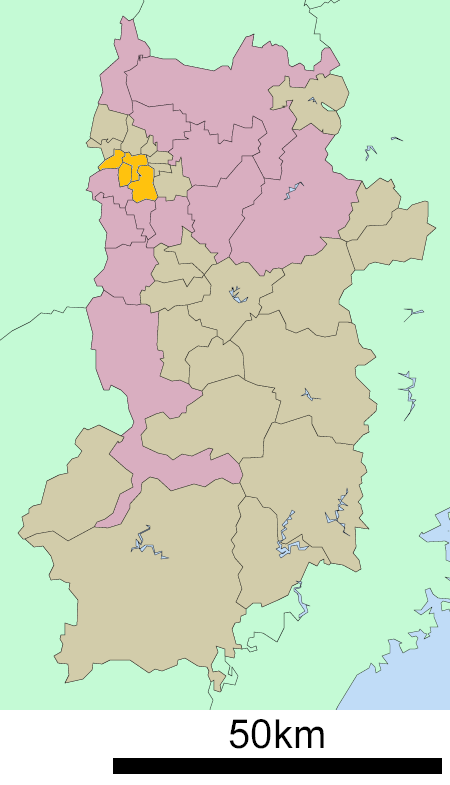
Location of Kitakatsuragi District in Nara Prefecture

Kitakatsuragi (北葛城郡, Kitakatsuragi-gun) is a district located in Nara Prefecture, Japan.

As of 2003, the district has an estimated population of 134,816 and a density of 1,886.07 persons per km^{2}. The total area is 71.48 km^{2}.

== Towns and villages ==
- Kanmaki
- Kawai
- Kōryō
- Ōji

== Mergers ==
- On October 1, 2004 the towns of Shinjō and Taima merged to form the new city of Katsuragi.
