= Shakudo Station =

Railway station in Katsuragi, Nara Prefecture, Japan

Shakudo Station 尺土駅
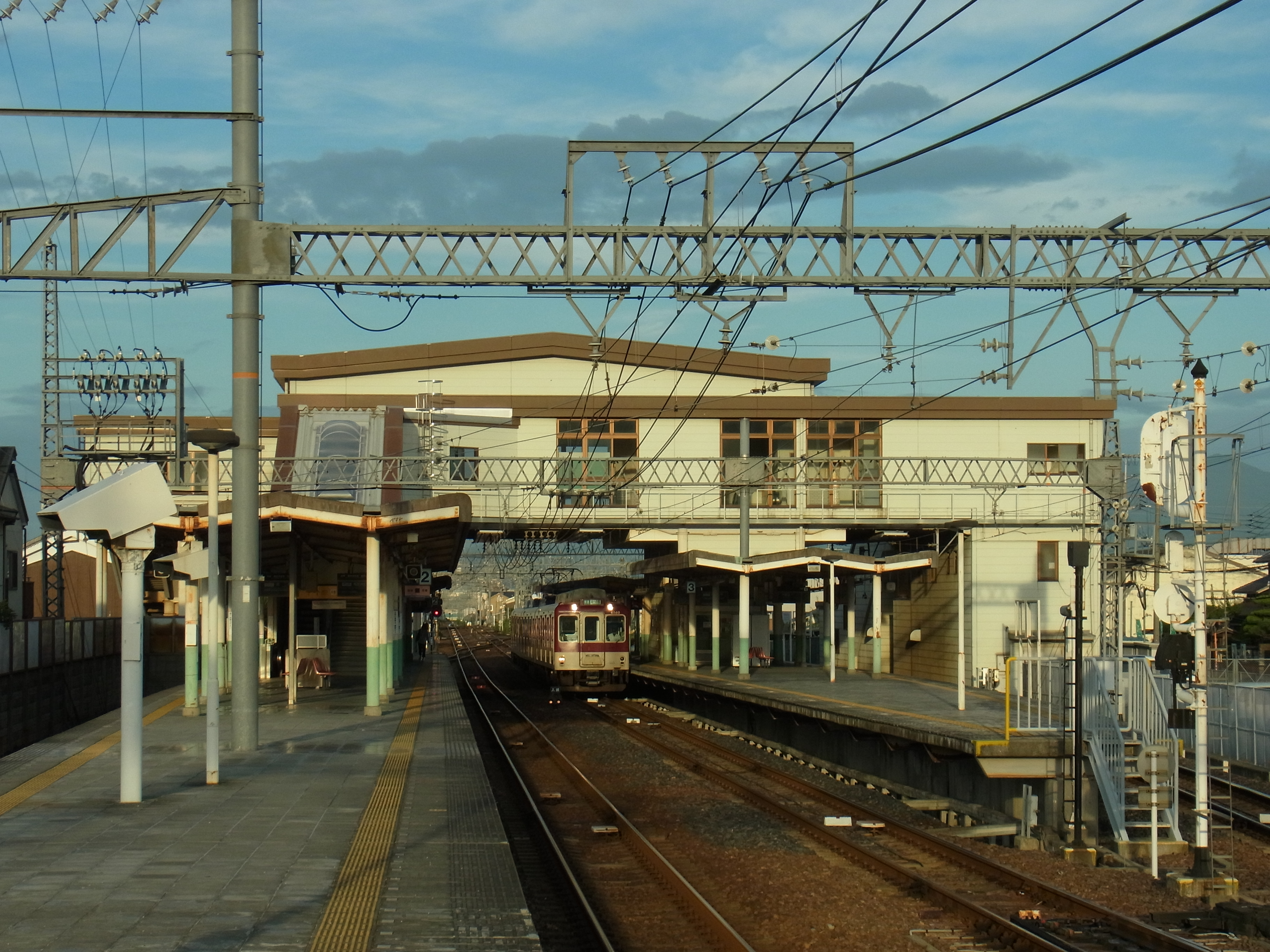
- Shakudo Station in August 2011

General information
- Location: 228, Shakudo, Katsuragi-shi, Nara-ken 639-2162; Japan
- Coordinates: 34°30′31″N 135°43′16″E
- System: Kintetsu Railway commuter rail station
- Owner: Kintetsu Railway
- Operator: Kintetsu Railway
- Lines: F Minami Osaka Line; P Gose Line
- Distance: 32.3 km (20.1 miles) from Osaka Abenobashi
- Platforms: 2 island platforms
- Connections: Bus terminal

Construction
- Cycle facilities: Available
- Accessible: Yes

Other information
- Station code: F23 P23
- Website: www.kintetsu.co.jp/station/station_info/station07023.html

History
- Opened: 29 March 1929

Passengers
- FY2019: 632 daily

Services
| Preceding station | Kintetsu Railway | Following station |
|---|---|---|
| Furuichi towards Ōsaka Abenobashi | Minami Osaka Line Express Rapid Express | Takadashi towards Kashiharajingū-mae |
| Iwaki towards Ōsaka Abenobashi | Minami Osaka Line Local Semi-Express | Takadashi towards Kashiharajingū-mae |
| Terminus | Gose Line Local Semi-Express | Kintetsu Shinjō towards Kintetsu Gose |
Location

Shakudo Station (尺土駅, Shakudo-eki) is a junction passenger railway station located in the city of Katsuragi, Nara Prefecture, Japan. It is operated by the private transportation company, Kintetsu Railway.

== Line ==
Shakudo Station is served by the Minami Osaka Line and is 32.3 kilometers from the starting point of the line at Osaka Abenobashi. It is also the terminus of the Gose Line, and is 5.2 kilometers from the opposing terminus of the line at Kintetsu Gose

== Layout ==
The station consists of two ground level island platforms connected by an elevated station building. This is an elevated station with two island platforms and four tracks, allowing for passing, and only one ticket gate. The Minami-Osaka Line and the Gose Line share the platform for each direction. The effective length of the platform is for eight cars. The station is staffed.

== Platforms ==
| 1 | ■ P Gose Line | for Kintetsu Gose |
| 2 | ■ F Minami Osaka Line | for Kashiharajingū-mae |
| 3 | ■ F Minami Osaka Line | for Osaka Abenobashi |
| 2 | ■ P Gose Line | disembarking platform for trains returning to the Gose Line |

Track layout
| ← for Furuichi and Osaka Abenobashi | | → for Kashiharajingu-mae and Yoshino |
| | ↓for Gose |

== History ==
Shakudo Station was opened 29 March 1929 as a station on the Osaka Railway. The Nanwa Electric Railway (predecessor of the Gose Line) connected to the station on 9 December 1930. It became a Kansai Express Railway station due to a company merger on 1 February 1943, and through a subsequent merger became a station on the Kintetsu Railway on 1 Jube 1944.

== Passenger statistics ==
In fiscal 2019 the station was used by an average of 2403 passengers daily (boarding passengers only).

== Surrounding area ==
- Nagao Shrine
- Japan National Route 166
- Japan National Route 168

== See also ==
- List of railway stations in Japan
