= Gose Station =

Railway station in Gose, Nara Prefecture, Japan

Gose Station 御所駅
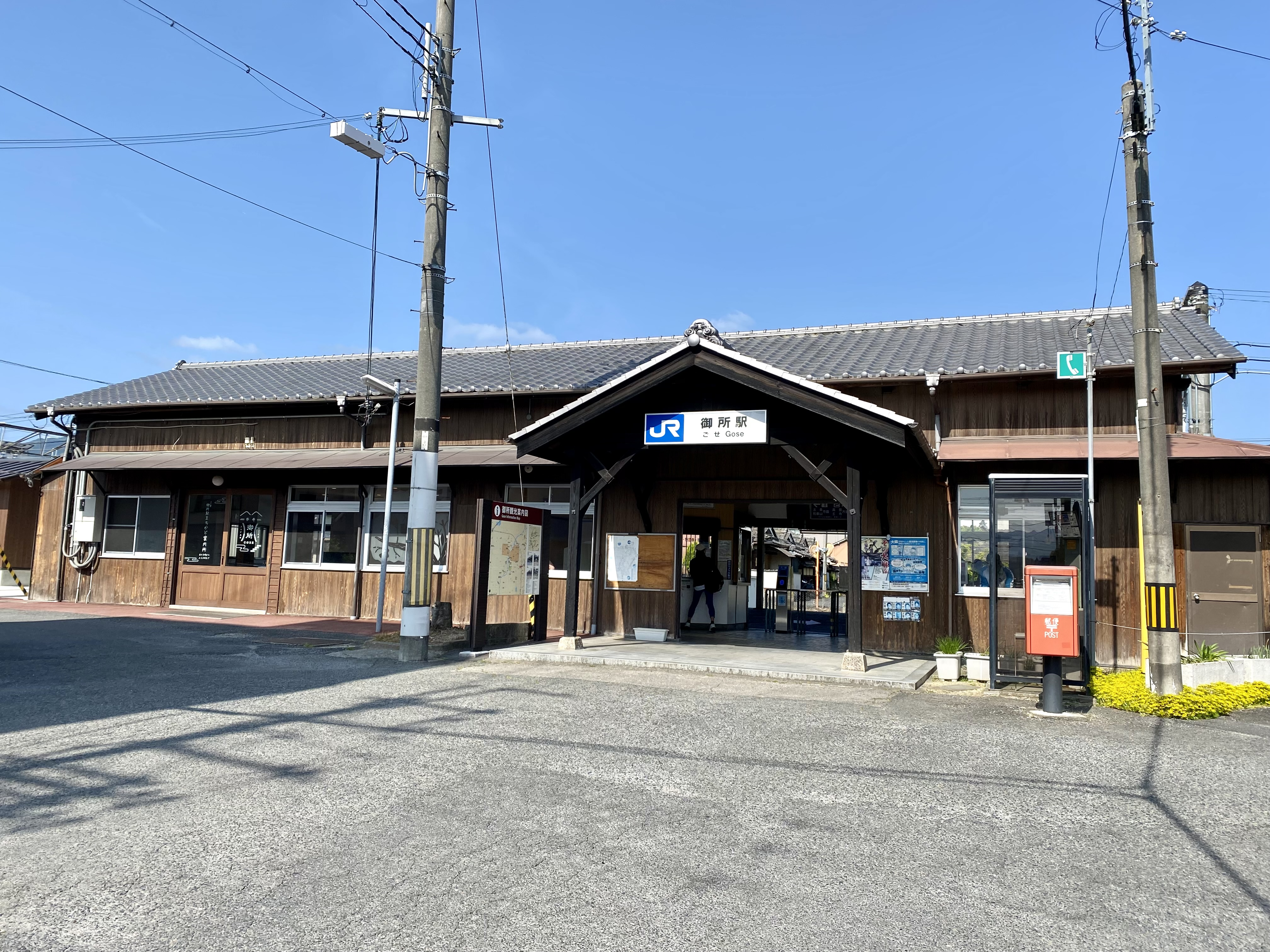
- Gose Station in May 2022

General information
- Location: 153-2, Gose-shi, Nara-ken 639-2200; Japan
- Coordinates: 34°27′53″N 135°44′02″E
- System: JR-West commuter rail station
- Owner: West Japan Railway Company
- Operator: West Japan Railway Company
- Line: T Wakayama Line
- Distance: 17.6 km (10.9 miles) from Ōji
- Platforms: 2 side platforms
- Tracks: 2
- Train operators: West Japan Railway Company
- Connections: Kanto Bus / Nara Kotsu Bus Lines Yamato-gō Shinjuku—Gojō Route at Kintetsu Gose-eki; Nara Kotsu Bus Lines 53・60・66・70・76・80・88・161・Tokkyu (Limited Express) at Kintetsu Gose-eki; Gose City Community Bus Himawari-gō East Course・West Course at Kintetsu Gose-eki

Construction
- Structure type: At grade
- Parking: None
- Cycle facilities: Available
- Accessible: None

Other information
- Website: http://www.jr-odekake.net/eki/top.php?id=0621807

History
- Opened: 10 May 1896
- Electrified: 1980

Passengers
- FY2019: 577 daily
Services
Preceding station	JR-West	Following station
T Wakayama Line
Tamade	Local	Yamato-Shinjō
Tamade	Regional Rapid Service	Yamato-Shinjō; One-way
Tamade; One-way	Rapid Service (through to the Yamatoji Line)	Yamato-Shinjō
Tamade	Yamatoji Rapid Service	Yamato-Shinjō; One-way
Location

Gose Station (御所駅, Gose-eki) is a passenger railway station in located in the city of Gose, Nara Prefecture, Japan, operated by West Japan Railway Company (JR West).

== Lines ==
Gose Station is served by the Wakayama Line, and is located 17.6 kilometers from the terminus of the line at Ōji.

== Station layout ==
The station is an above-ground station with two side platforms and two tracks. It is staffed.

=== Platforms ===
1	■ T Wakayama Line	for Gojō and Hashimoto
2	■ T Wakayama Line	for Takada and Ōji

== History ==
Gose Station opened as a signal stop on 10 May 1896 on the Nacwa Railway. The Nanwa Railway was absorbed by the Kansai Railway in 1904, which was nationalized in 1907. The station was renamed to its present name on 1 April 1940. With the privatization of the Japan National Railways (JNR) on April 1, 1987, the station came under the aegis of the West Japan Railway Company.

== Passenger statistics ==
In fiscal 2019, the station was used by an average of 577 passengers daily (boarding passengers only).

== Surrounding Area ==
- Kintetsu Gose Station
- Gose City Hall
- Katsuragi Park
- Gose Post Office
- Gose Police Building (former Gose Police Station)
- Gose Municipal Gose Elementary School
- Gose Municipal Gose Junior High School

== See also ==
- List of railway stations in Japan
