= Iwaki Station (Nara) =

Railway station in Katsuragi, Nara Prefecture, Japan

Iwaki Station 磐城駅
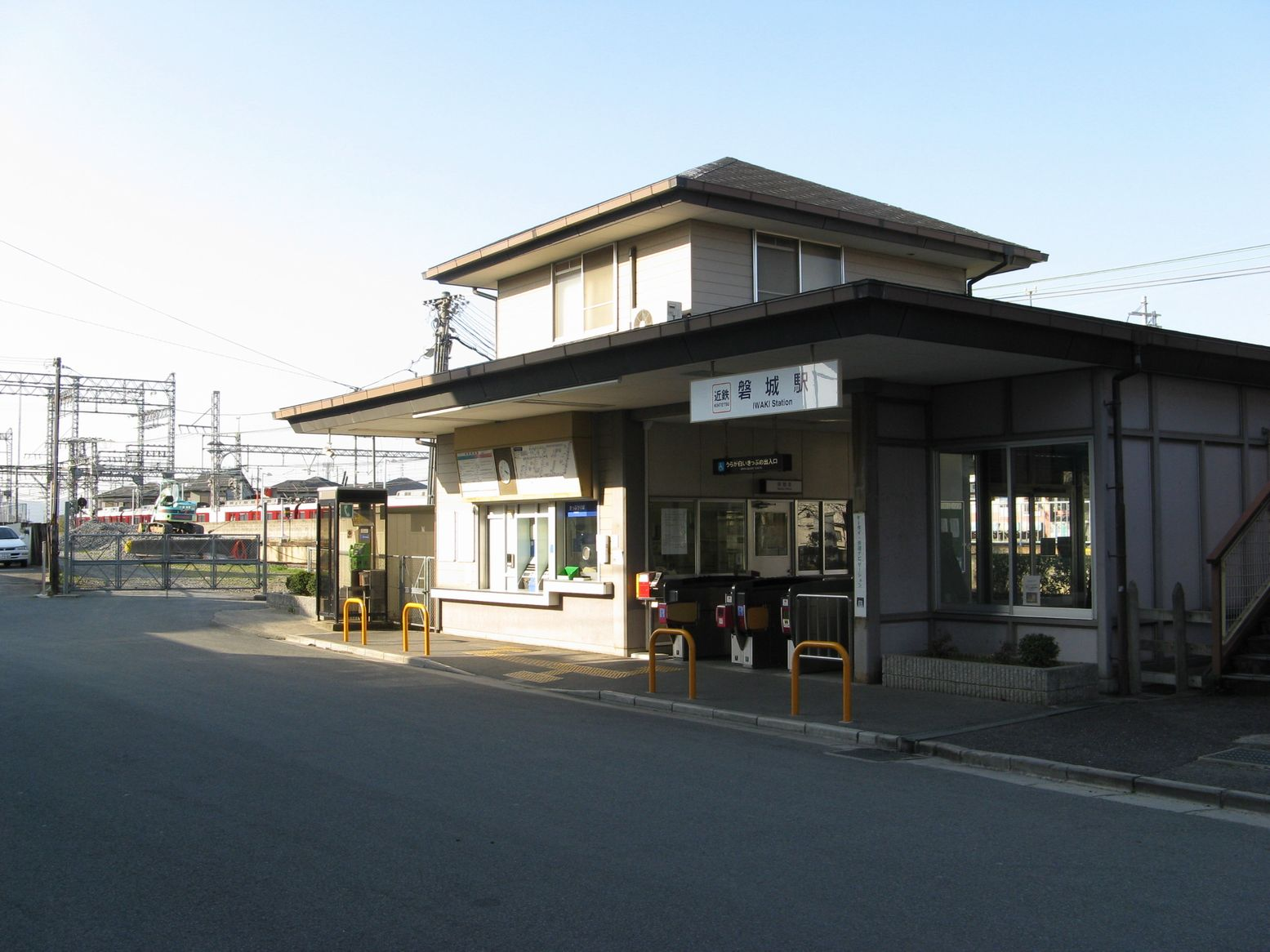
- Iwaki Station in March 2008

General information
- Location: 220-2, Nagao, Katsuragi-shi, Nara-ken 639-2164; Japan
- Coordinates: 34°30′41″N 135°42′39″E
- System: Kintetsu Railway commuter rail station
- Owner: Kintetsu Railway
- Operator: Kintetsu Railway
- Line: F Minami Osaka Line
- Distance: 31.3 km (19.4 miles) from Osaka Abenobashi
- Platforms: 2 side platforms
- Tracks: 2
- Train operators: Kintetsu Railway
- Connections: Bus terminal

Construction
- Cycle facilities: Available
- Accessible: Yes

Other information
- Station code: F22
- Website: www.kintetsu.co.jp/station/station_info/station07026.html

History
- Opened: 29 March 1929

Passengers
- FY2019: 599 daily

Services
Preceding station	Kintetsu Railway	Following station
Taimadera towards Ōsaka Abenobashi	Minami Osaka Line Local Semi-Express	Shakudo towards Kashiharajingū-mae
Location

Iwaki Station (磐城駅, Iwaki-eki) is a passenger railway station located in the city of Katsuragi, Nara Prefecture, Japan. It is operated by the private transportation company, Kintetsu Railway.

== Line ==
Iwaki Station is served by the Minami Osaka Line and is 31.3 kilometers from the starting point of the line at Osaka Abenobashi.

== Layout ==
The station is an above-ground station with two opposed side platforms and two tracks. Both the ticket gates and concourse are at ground level. The entrance and exit is at platform 1, and a level crossing connects to platform 2 on the opposite side. The effective length of the platform is long enough for four cars, and there is a siding for maintenance vehicles on the outbound platform. The station is unattended.

== Platforms ==
1	■ F Minami Osaka Line	for Kashiharajingū-mae
2	■ F Minami Osaka Line	for Osaka Abenobashi

== History ==
Iwaki Station was opened 29 March 1929 as a station on the Osaka Railway. It became a Kansai Express Railway station due to a company merger on 1 February 1943, and through a subsequent merger became a station on the Kintetsu Railway on 1 Jube 1944.

== Passenger statistics ==
In fiscal 2019 the station was used by an average of 599 passengers daily (boarding passengers only).

== Surrounding area ==
- Katsuragi City Hall Taima Building (formerly Taima Town Hall)
- Katsuragi City Hakuho Junior High School
- Nagao Shrine

== See also ==
- List of railway stations in Japan
