= Nijōzan Station =

Railway station in Kashiba, Nara Prefecture, Japan

Nijōzan Station 二上山駅
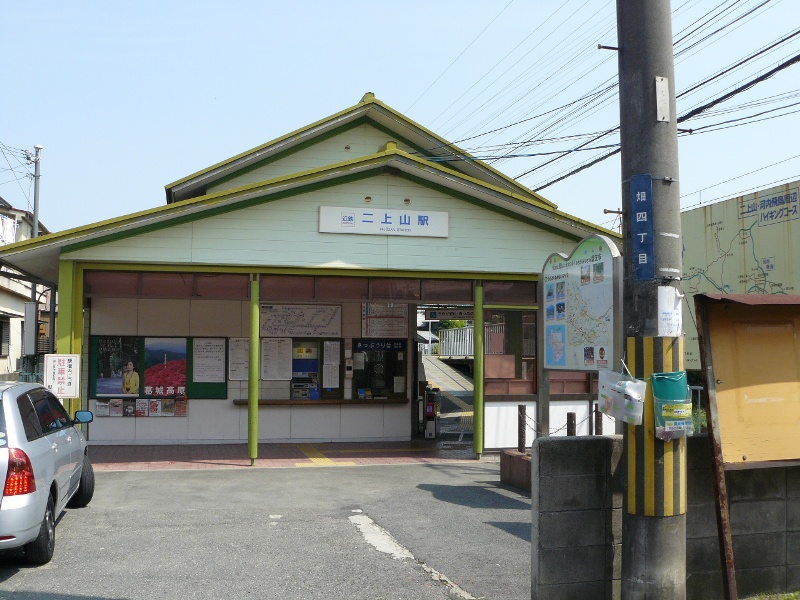
- Nijōzan Station

General information
- Location: 106-2, Hata 4-chōme, Kashiba-shi, Nara-ken 639-0245; Japan
- Coordinates: 34°32′21″N 135°41′09″E
- System: Kintetsu Railway commuter rail station
- Owner: Kintetsu Railway
- Operator: Kintetsu Railway
- Line: F Minami Osaka Line
- Distance: 27.3 km (17.0 miles) from Osaka Abenobashi
- Platforms: 2 side platforms
- Tracks: 2
- Train operators: Kintetsu Railway
- Connections: Bus terminal

Construction
- Cycle facilities: Available
- Accessible: Yes

Other information
- Station code: F19
- Website: www.kintetsu.co.jp/station/station_info/station07023.html

History
- Opened: 29 March 1929

Passengers
- FY2019: 632 daily

Services
Preceding station	Kintetsu Railway	Following station
Kaminotaishi towards Ōsaka Abenobashi	Minami Osaka Line Local Semi-Express	Nijōjinjaguchi towards Kashiharajingū-mae
Location

Nijōzan Station (二上山駅, Nijōzan-eki) is a passenger railway station located in the city of Kashiba, Nara Prefecture, Japan. It is operated by the private transportation company, Kintetsu Railway.

== Line ==
Nijōzan Station is served by the Minami Osaka Line and is 27.3 kilometers from the starting point of the line at Osaka Abenobashi.

== Layout ==
The station is an above-ground station with two opposed side platforms and two tracks. Both the ticket gates and concourse are at ground level. The entrance and exit is at platform 1, and a level crossing connects to platform 2 on the opposite side. The effective length of the platform is long enough for four cars. The station is staffed.

== Platforms ==
1	■ F Minami Osaka Line	for Kashiharajingū-mae
2	■ F Minami Osaka Line	for Osaka Abenobashi

== History ==
Nijōzan Station was opened 29 March 1929 as a station on the Osaka Railway. It became a Kansai Express Railway station due to a company merger on 1 February 1943, and through a subsequent merger became a station on the Kintetsu Railway on 1 Jube 1944.

== Passenger statistics ==
In fiscal 2019 the station was used by an average of 632 passengers daily (boarding passengers only).

== Surrounding area ==
- Mount Nijō
- Donzurubō
- Kintetsu Nijō Station

== See also ==
- List of railway stations in Japan
