= Gose Line =

Railway line in Nara Prefecture, Japan

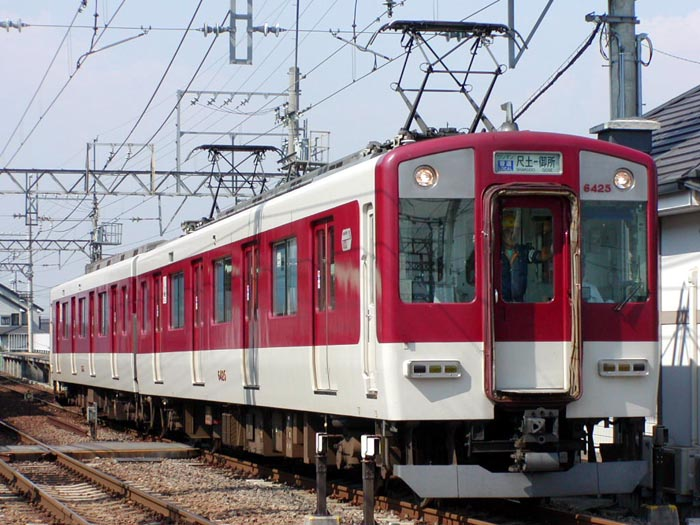
- 64320 series EMU on a one-manned Local train

Overview
- Native name: 御所線
- Owner: Kintetsu Railway
- Line number: P
- Locale: Nara Prefecture, Japan
- Termini: Shakudo; Kintetsu Gose
- Stations: 4
- Color on map: (#008446)

Service
- Type: Commuter rail
- System: Kintetsu Railway
- Operator: Kintetsu Railway

History
- Opened: December 9, 1930; 95 years ago

Technical
- Track length: 5.2 km (3.2 mi)
- Num of tracks: Single-track
- Character: Commuter rail
- Track gauge: 1,067 mm (3 ft 6 in)
- Electrification: 1,500 V DC (overhead lines)
- Operating speed: 65 km/h (40 mph)
- Signalling: Automatic closed block
- Train protection system: Kintetsu ATS

The Gose Line (御所線, Gose sen) is a railway line of Kintetsu Corporation in Nara Prefecture, Japan connecting Shakudo Station in Katsuragi and Gose Station in Gose.

== Description ==
The line has four stations including the terminal Gose and the transfer station Shakudo. It is mainly used by commuters to Osaka, as well as those who access to Mt. Katsuragi. At Gose, there is a bus headed for the Katsuragisan Ropeway, which is also run by Kintetsu.

== History ==
The Nanwa Electric Company opened the line in 1930, electrified at 1500 VDC. The company merged with Kintetsu in 1944.

== Stations ==
No.	Station	km	Connections	Location	
P23	Shakudo 尺土	0.0	Minami Osaka Line	Katsuragi	Nara Prefecture
P24	Kintetsu Shinjō 近鉄新庄	2.4		Katsuragi	Nara Prefecture
P25	Oshimi 忍海	3.9		Katsuragi	Nara Prefecture
P26	Kintetsu Gose 近鉄御所	5.2	JR West - Wakayama Line via Gose Station	Gose	Nara Prefecture
