= Taima, Nara =

Dissolved municipality in Nara prefecture, Japan

Taima (當麻町, Taima-chō) was a town located in Kitakatsuragi District, Nara Prefecture, Japan.

On October 1, 2004, Taima, along with the town of Shinjō (also from Kitakatsuragi District), was merged to create the city of Katsuragi.
