= Katsuragi, Nara =

Katsuragi 葛󠄀城市
- City
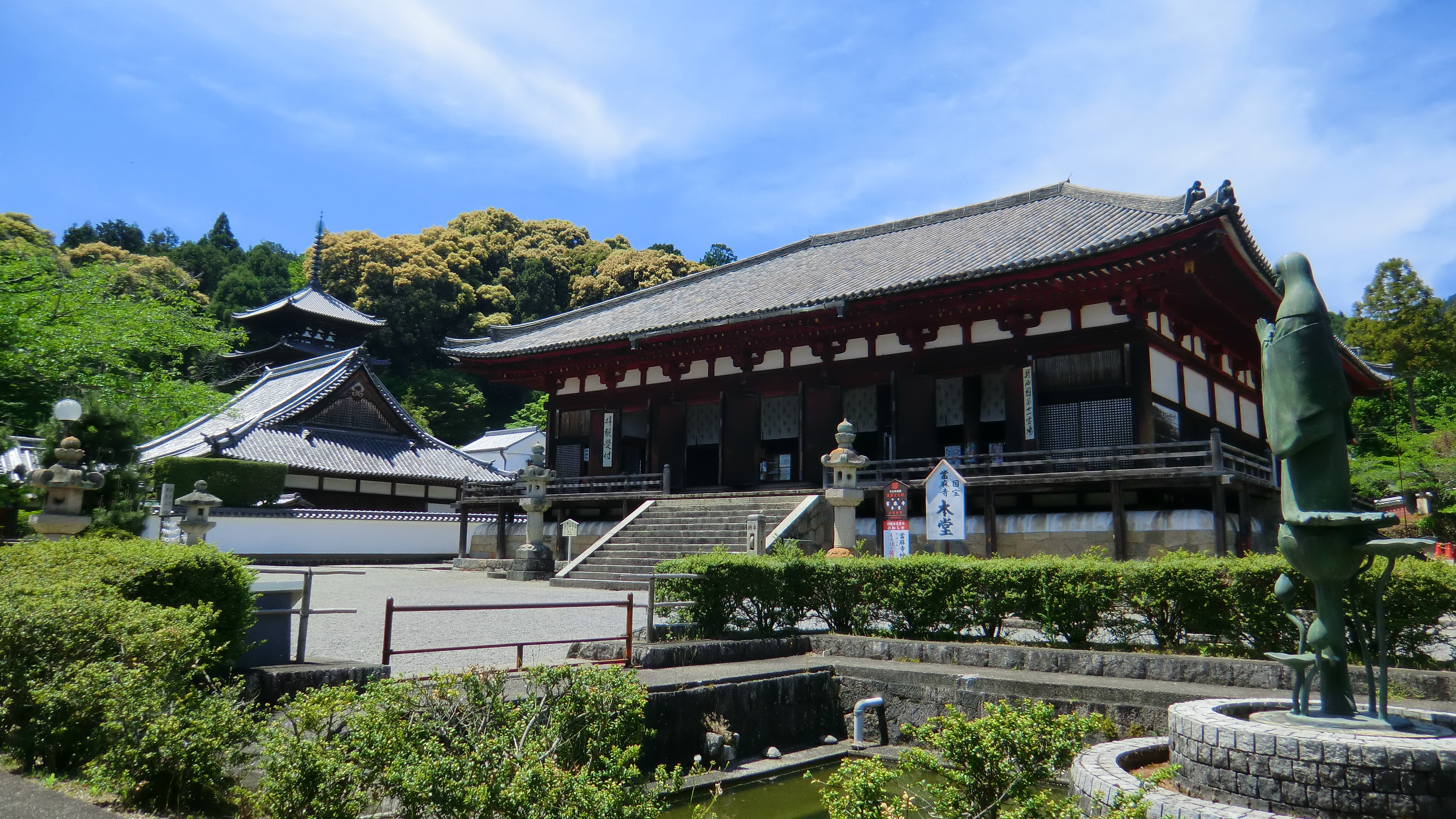
- Taima-dera

- Flag Emblem
- Interactive map of Katsuragi
- Location in Japan
- Coordinates: 34°29′21″N 135°43′35″E
- Country: Japan
- Region: Kansai
- Prefecture: Nara

Government
  - Mayor: Kazuhiko Ako

Area
  - Total: 33.72 km^{2} (13.02 sq mi)

Population (December 1, 2024)
  - Total: 37,809
  - Density: 1,121/km^{2} (2,904/sq mi)
- Time zone: UTC+09:00 (JST)
- City hall address: 166 Kakinomoto, Katsuragi-shi, Nara-ken 639-2195
- Website: www.city.katsuragi.nara.jp
- Symbols
- Bird: Japanese bush warbler
- Flower: Peony and chrysanthemum
- Tree: Quercus gilva and camphor laurel

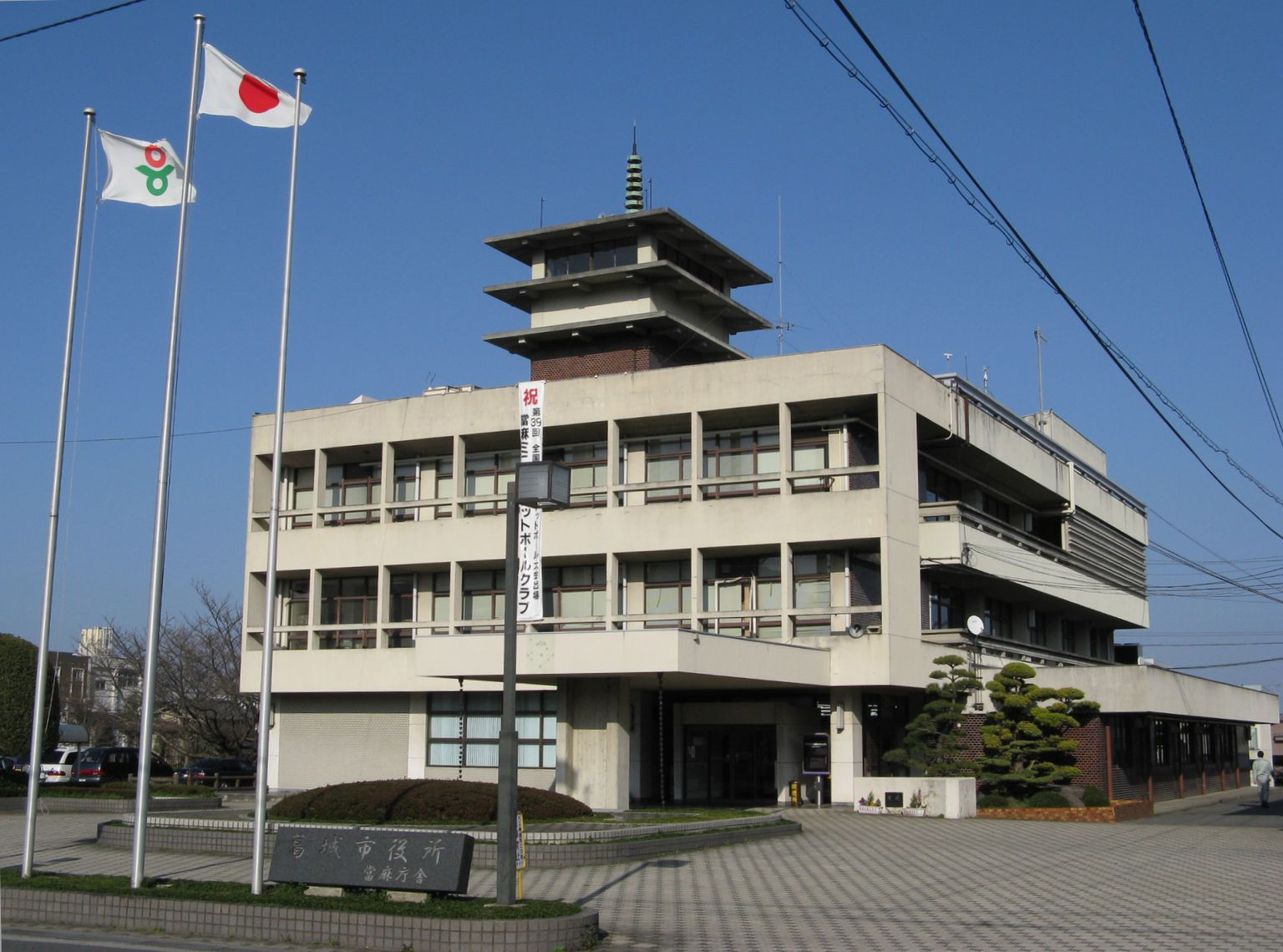
Katsuragi City Hall

Katsuragi (葛󠄀城市, Katsuragi-shi) is a city located in Nara Prefecture, Japan. As of 1 December 2024, the city had an estimated population of 37,809 in 15842 households, and a population density of 1100 persons per km^{2}. The total area of the city is 33.72 km^{2} (13.02 sq mi).

== Geography ==
Katsuragi is located at the eastern foot of the mountain range that stretches from Mount Katsuragi to Mount Nijō, bordered by Osaka Prefecture to the west. Located in the Nara Basin, the climate is cold enough to cause frost in the winter and humid in the summer. Also, since there is little rain throughout the year, there were reservoirs all over the city to deal with water shortages.

=== Mountains ===
- Mt Iwahashiyama
- Mt Katsuragi
- Mt Kongo
- Mt Nijo

=== Neighboring municipalities ===
Nara Prefecture

- Yamatotakada
- Gose
- Kashiba

Osaka Prefecture

- Taishi
- Kanan

=== Climate ===
Katsuragi has a humid subtropical climate (Köppen Cfa) characterized by warm summers and cool winters with light to no snowfall. The average annual temperature in Katsuragi is 14.2 °C. The average annual rainfall is 1636 mm with September as the wettest month. The temperatures are highest on average in August, at around 26.4 °C, and lowest in January, at around 2.7 °C.

=== Demographics ===
Per Japanese census data, the population of Katsuragi is as shown below

Historical population
Year	Pop.	±%
1960	17,428	—
1970	21,431	+23.0%
1980	29,546	+37.9%
1990	33,939	+14.9%
2000	34,950	+3.0%
2010	35,859	+2.6%
2020	36,832	+2.7%

== History ==
The area of Katsuragi was part of ancient Yamato Province. The city has many temples, shrines and kofun, many which contain important national treasures and important cultural properties. The villages of Shinjō and Taima in Kitakatsuragi District) were established with the creation of the modern municipalities system on April 1, 1889. Shinjō was raised to town status on August 31, 1923 followed by Taima on April 1, 1966. The city of Katsuragi was established on October 1, 2004, from the merger of the two towns.

== Government ==
Katsuragi has a mayor-council form of government with a directly elected mayor and a unicameral city council of 15 members. Katsuragi contributes one member to the Nara Prefectural Assembly. In terms of national politics, the city is part of the Nara 3rd district of the lower house of the Diet of Japan.

== Economy ==
Katsuragi is basically a rural area, and the production of knitted goods and socks was popular as a home industry for farmers, but it is now in decline. It also serves as a commuter town for Osaka Prefecture and the neighboring city of Yamatotakada.

== Education ==
Katsuragi has four public elementary schools and two public junior high schools operated by the city government and one public high school operated by the Nara Prefectural Board of Education.

== Transportation ==
=== Railways ===
JR West - Wakayama Line

T Yamato-Shinjō

Kintetsu Railway - Gose Line

Shakudo - Kintetsu Shinjō - Oshimi

Kintetsu Railway - Minami Osaka Line

Nijō-jinjaguchi - Taimadera - Iwaki - Shakudo

=== Highways ===
- Minami-Hanna Road
- National Route 24
- National Route 165
- National Route 166
- National Route 168

== Local attractions ==
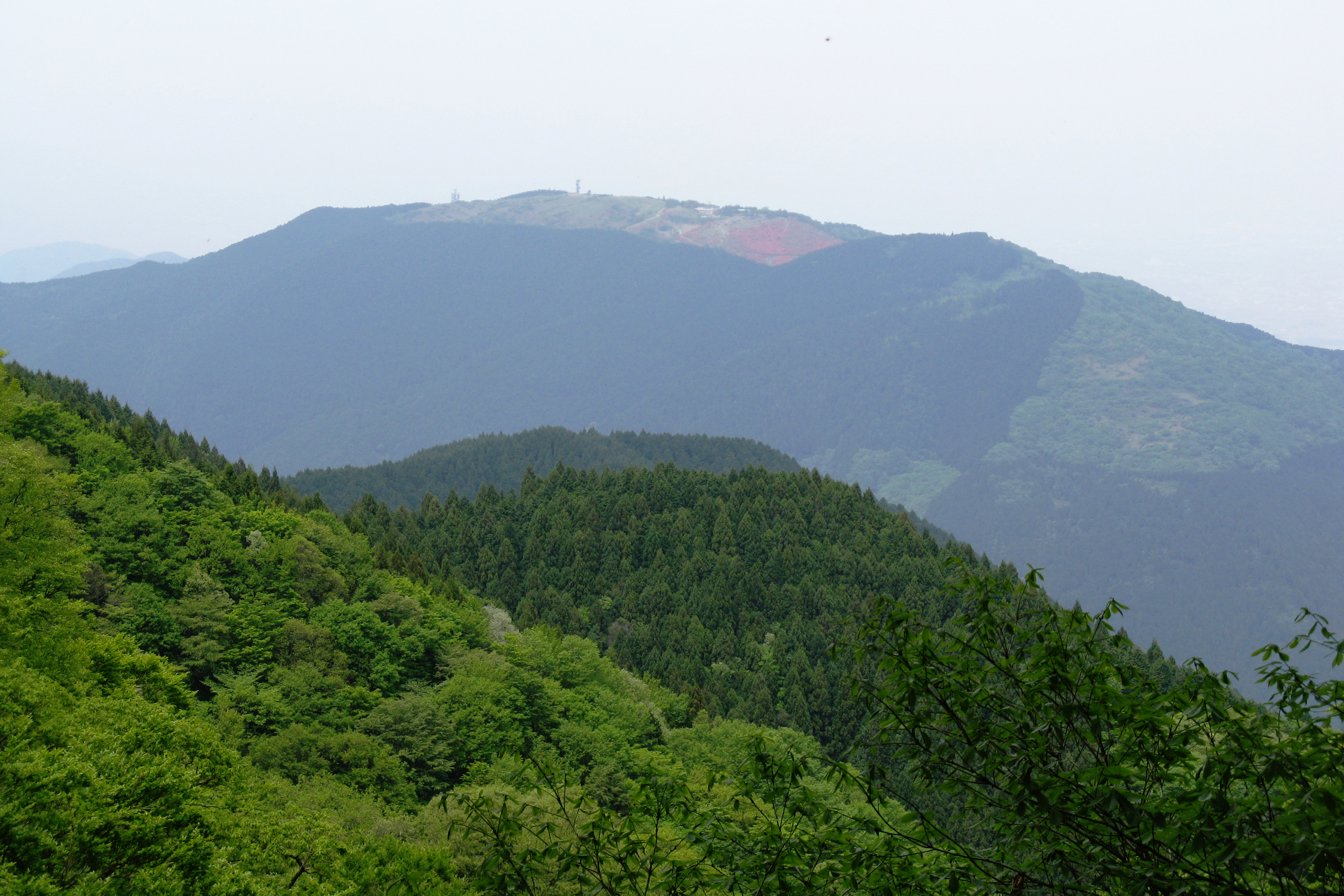
Mount Katsuragi

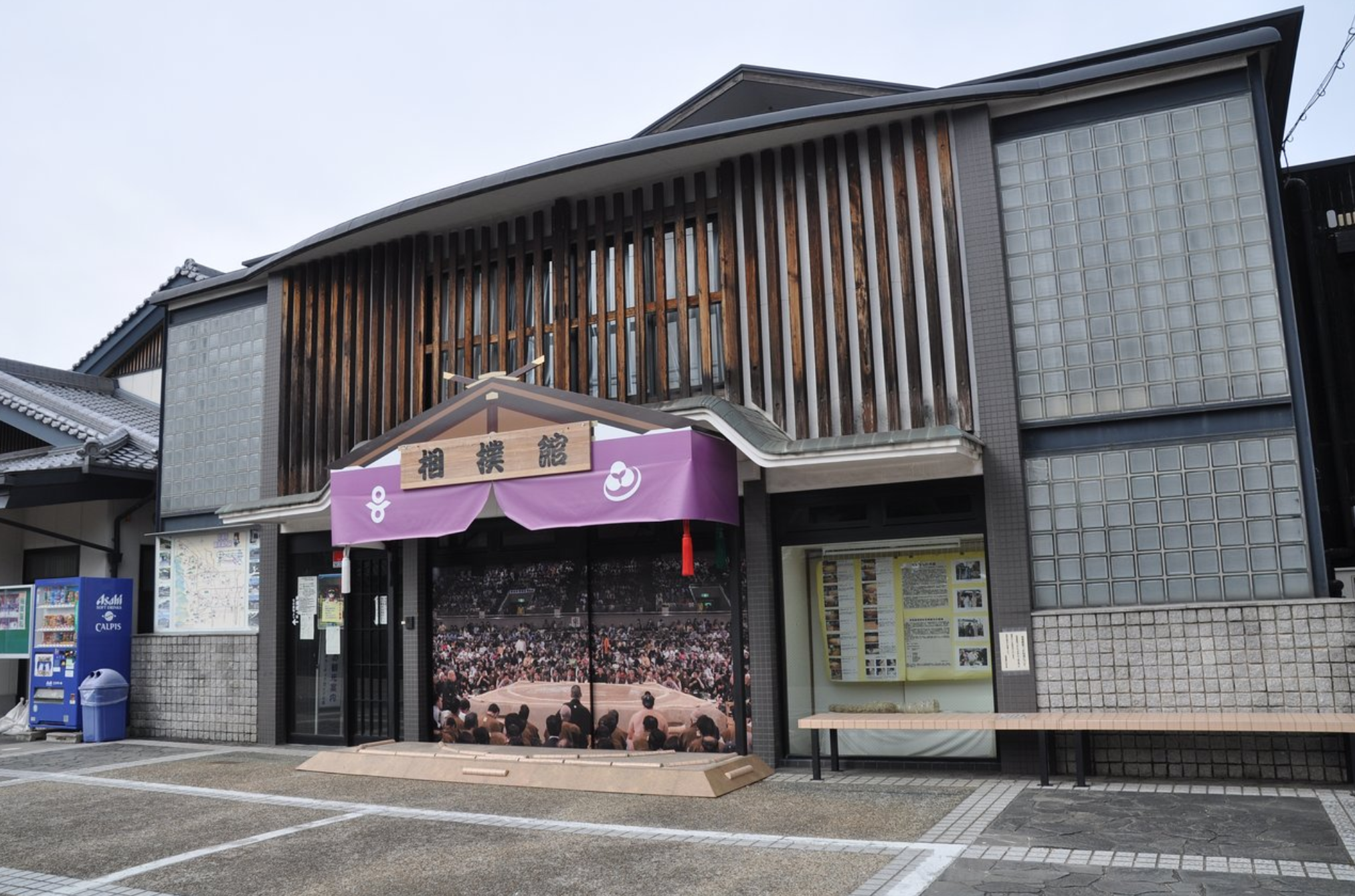
Kehayaza Sumo Museum

=== Buddhist temples ===
- Sekko-ji
- Taima-dera

=== Shrines ===
- Fuefuki Shrine
- Kakinomoto Shrine
- Nagao Shrine

=== Kofun ===
- Kitahanachi Otsuka Kofun
- Tomb of Prince Otsu
- Fuefuki Shrine Kofun

=== Other ===
- Katsuragi city history museum
- Sanroku Park
- Sumo Pavilion
- Takenouchi route

== Notable people from Katsuragi ==
- Empress Iitoyo (Iitoyo Tenno)
- Kakinomotono Hitomaro
- Maekawa Samio
- Princess Chujyo (Chujyohime)
- Princess Oku (Okunohimemiko) and Prince Otsu (Otsunomiko)
- Ryōtarō Shiba, author
- Mitsuo Fuchida, Imperial Japanese Navy admiral
