= Tamade Station (Nara) =

Railway station in Gose, Nara Prefecture, Japan

Tamade Station 玉手駅
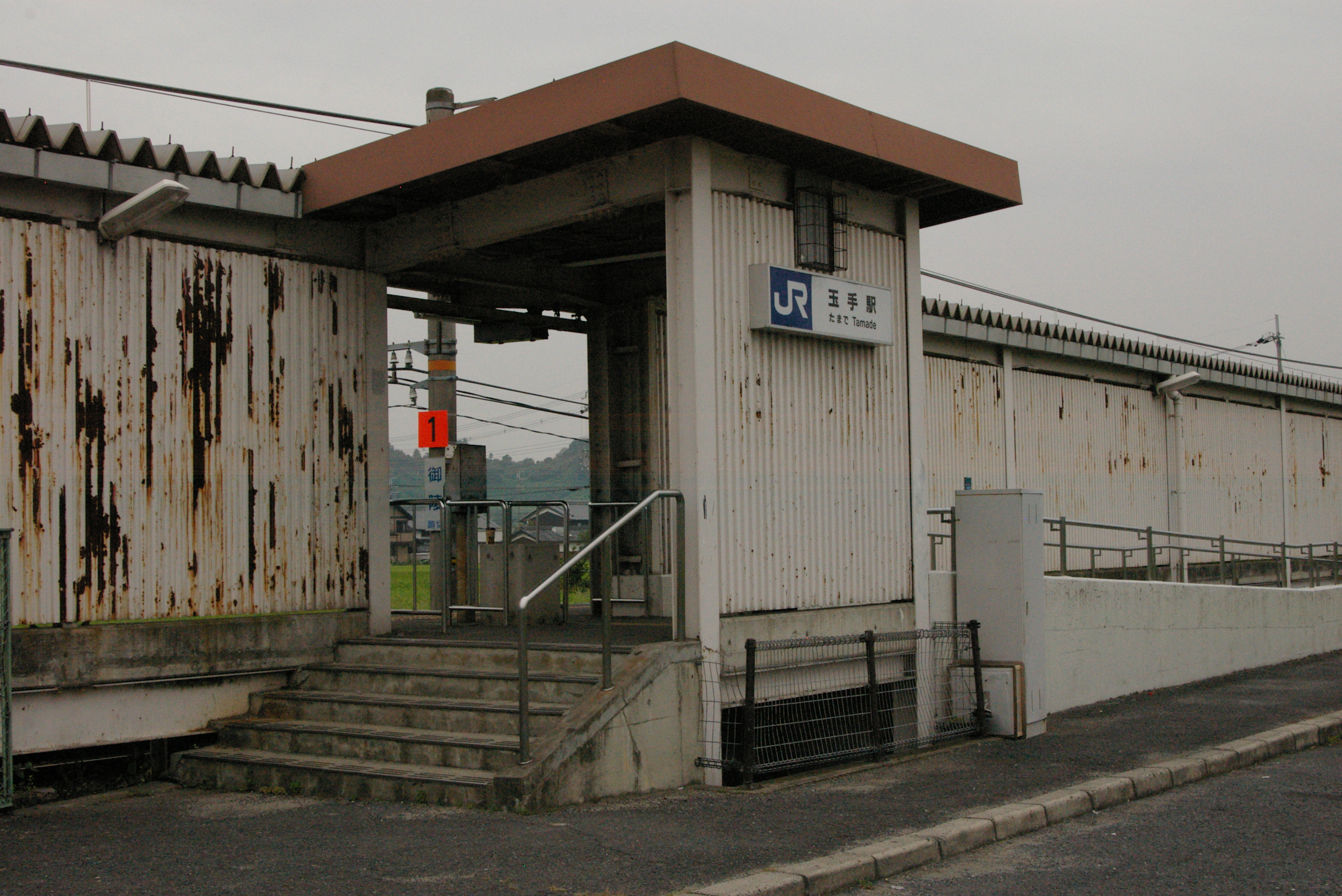
- Tamade Station—September 2008

General information
- Location: 129-7, Aza Hatada, Ōaza Tamade, Gose-shi, Nara-ken 639-2247; Japan
- Coordinates: 34°27′30″N 135°44′57″E
- System: JR-West commuter rail station
- Owner: West Japan Railway Company
- Operator: West Japan Railway Company
- Line: T Wakayama Line
- Distance: 19.4 km (12.1 miles) from Ōji
- Platforms: 1 side platform
- Tracks: 1
- Train operators: West Japan Railway Company
- Connections: Nara Kotsu Bus Lines 53 at Chihara

Construction
- Structure type: At grade
- Parking: None
- Cycle facilities: Available
- Accessible: None

Other information
- Website: https://www.jr-odekake.net/eki/top.php?id=0621833

History
- Opened: 11 March 1989

Passengers
- 2019: 417 daily
Services
Preceding station	JR-West	Following station
T Wakayama Line
Wakigami	Local	Gose
Wakigami	Regional Rapid Service	Gose; One-way
Wakigami; One-way	Rapid Service (through to the Yamatoji Line)	Gose
Wakigami	Yamatoji Rapid Service	Gose
Location

Tamade Station (玉手駅, Tamade-eki) is a passenger railway station in located in the city of Gose, Nara Prefecture, Japan, operated by West Japan Railway Company (JR West).

== Lines ==
Tamade Station is served by the Wakayama Line, and is located 19.4 kilometers from the terminus of the line at Ōji.

== Station layout ==
The station is an above-ground station with a single side platform located on the right side of the station toward Gojo. There is no structure that can be called a station building, but the platform is almost entirely covered. The effective length of the platform is 125 meters enough for six carriages. It is equipped with upright automatic ticket vending machines and simple ICOCA ticket gates. It is an unstaffed station.

== History ==
Tamade Station opened on 11 March 1989.

== Passenger statistics ==
In fiscal 2019, the station was used by an average of 417 passengers daily (boarding passengers only).

== Surrounding Area ==
The viaduct of the Keihanawa Expressway (Yamato-Gose Road) passes directly above the station.

- The tumulus of Emperor Kōan
- Kisshōsō-ji Temple (the Birthplace of En no Gyōja)
- Nara Prefectural Gose Technical High School

== See also ==
- List of railway stations in Japan
