= Kintetsu Gose Station =

Railway station in Gose, Nara Prefecture, Japan

Kintetsu Gose 近鉄御所
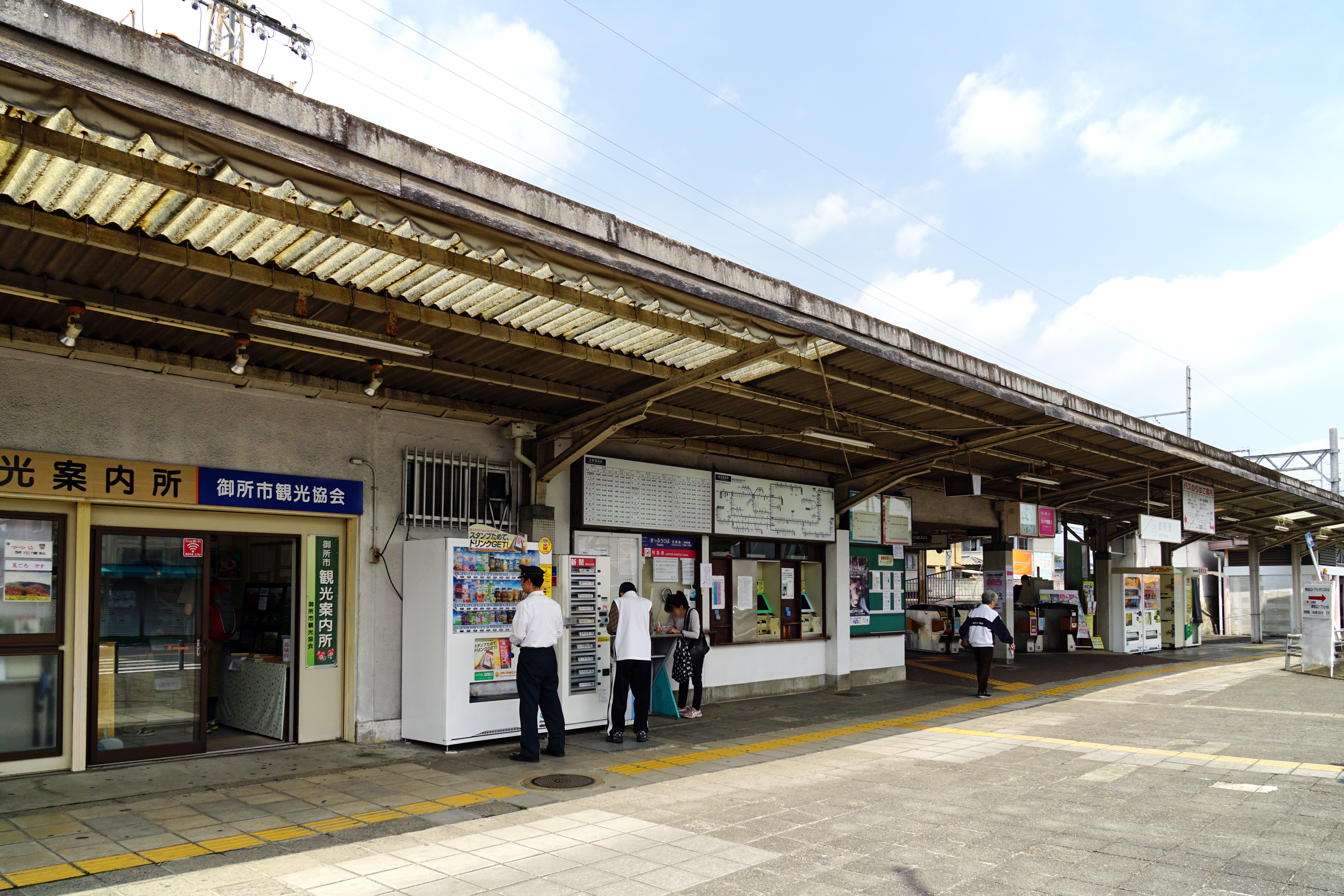
- Kintetsu Gose Station entrance

General information
- Location: 180-1 Suehirocho, Gose-shi, Nara-ken 639-2303; Japan
- Coordinates: 34°27′51.84″N 135°43′57.15″E
- System: Kintetsu Railway commuter rail station
- Owner: Kintetsu Railway
- Operator: Kintetsu Railway
- Line: P Gose Line
- Distance: 5.2 km (3.2 miles) from Shakudo
- Platforms: 1 side platforms
- Tracks: 1
- Train operators: Kintetsu Railway
- Connections: Bus terminal

Construction
- Cycle facilities: Available
- Accessible: Yes

Other information
- Station code: P25
- Website: www.kintetsu.co.jp/station/station_info/station15008.html

History
- Opened: 9 December 1930
- Former names: Nanwa-Gosemachi (to 1944), Kinki Nippon Gose Station (to 1970)

Passengers
- FY2019: 1473 daily

Services
Preceding station	Kintetsu Railway	Following station
Oshimi towards Shakudo	Gose Line Local Semi-Express	Terminus
Location

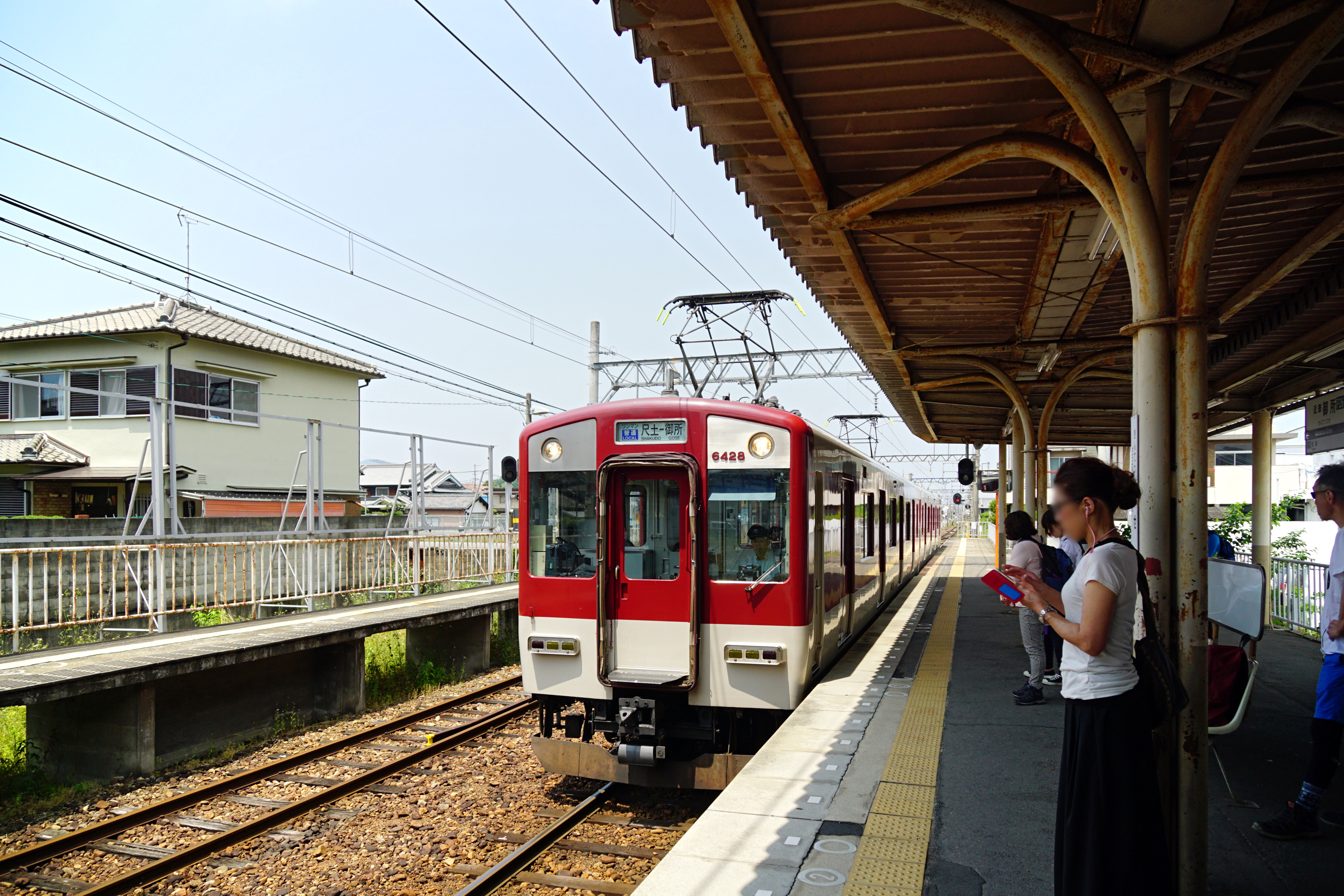
Platform

Kintetsu Gose Station (近鉄御所駅, Kintetsu-Gose-eki) is a passenger railway station located in the city of Gose, Nara Prefecture, Japan. It is operated by the private transportation company, Kintetsu Railway.

== Line ==
Kintetsu Gose Station is served by the Gose Line and is 5.2 kilometers from the starting point of the line at Shakudo.

== Layout ==
The station is an above-ground station with two opposed side platforms and two tracks. Both the ticket gates and concourse are at ground level. The entrance and exit is at platform 1, and a level crossing connects to platform 2 on the opposite side. The effective length of the platform is long enough for four cars. The station is unattended.

== Platforms ==
1	■ P Gose Line	for Shakudo

== History ==
Kintetsu Gose Station was opened 9 December 1930 as Nanwa-Gosemachi Station (南和御所町駅) on the Nanwa Electric Railway. It became a Kansai Express Railway station due to a company merger on 1 April 1944, and through a subsequent merger became a station on the Kintetsu Railway on 1 June 1944, becoming Kankyu Gose Station (関急御所駅). It was renamed to Kinki Nippon Gose Station (畿日本御所駅) at that time. It renamed to its present name on 1 March 1970.

== Passenger statistics ==
In fiscal 2019 the station was used by an average of 1887 passengers daily (boarding passengers only).

== Surrounding area ==
- Gose Police Building (former Gose Police Station)
- Gose City Hall
- Saiseikai Gose Hospital
- Nara Prefectural Seisho High School

=== Buses ===
Buses are operated by Nara Kotsu Bus Lines Co., Ltd. (Nara Kotsu website)

- Bus stop 1
  - limited express buses for Shingu Station via Kamokimi no Yu, Gojo Bus Station, Totsukawa Onsen, Hongu Taisha, Yunomine Onsen and Kawayu Onsen
  - for Gojo Bus Station
  - for Gojo Bus Station via Kamokimi no Yu
  - for Gojo Bus Station via Techno Chuo-dori higashi
- Bus stop 2
  - expressway bus "Yamato" for Shinjuku (Expressway Bus Terminal) - operation with Kanto Bus Co., Ltd.
  - for Yagi Station via Takadashi Station, AEON Mall Kashihara-kita and Idai-byoin-mae (Nara Medical University Hospital)
  - for Kintetsu Takada Station via Takadashi Station
  - for Oshimi
- Bus stop 3
  - for Katsuragi Ropeway-mae
- Bus stop 4
  - for Yagi Station via Gunkaibashi, Kashiharajingu-mae Station, Ousa and Idai-byoin Genkanguchi (Nara Medical University Hospital)

== See also ==
- List of railway stations in Japan
