= Nagao Shrine =

Shinto shrine in Nara Prefecture, Japan

Nagao Shrine 長尾神社
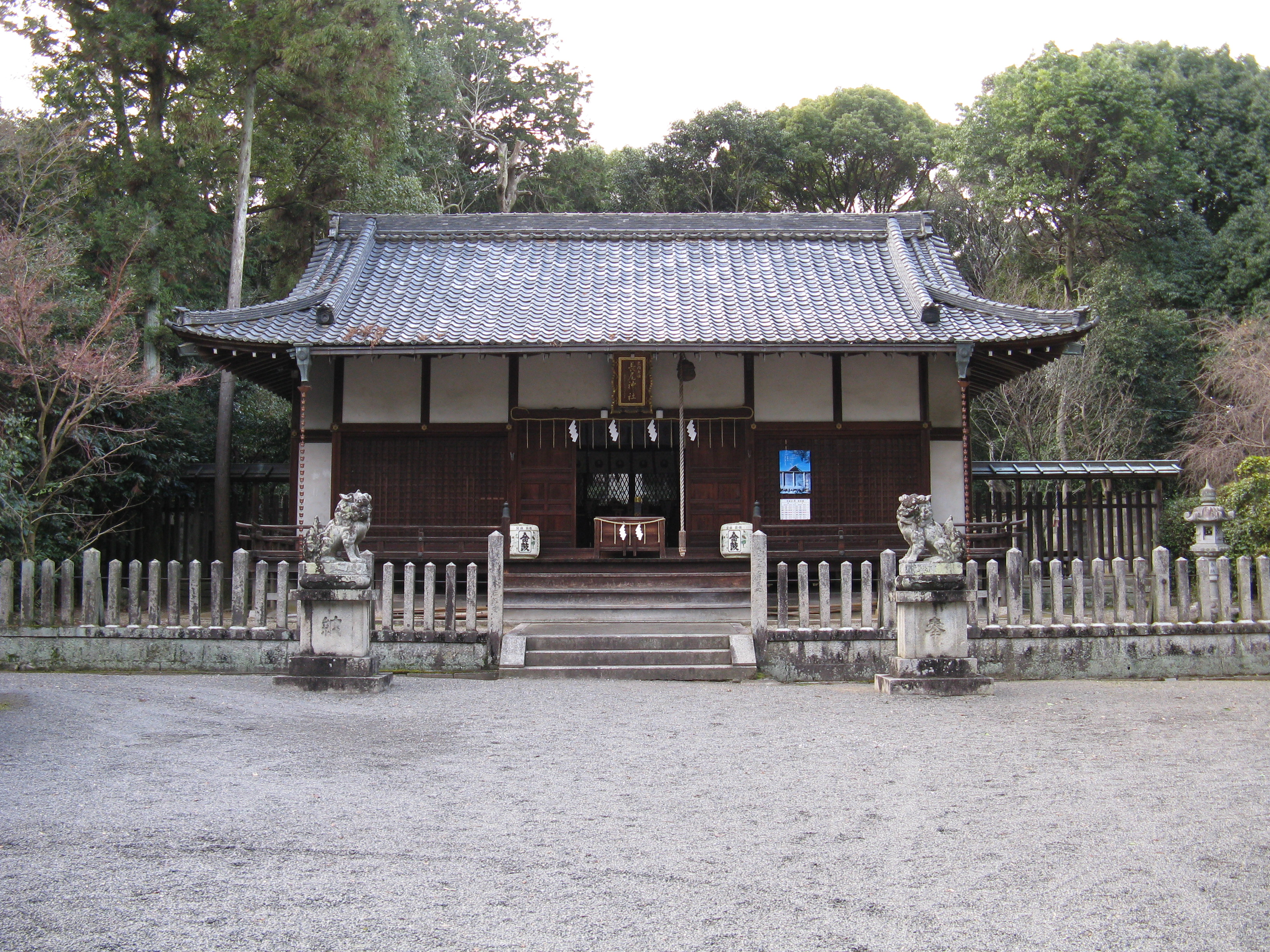
- The haiden or hall of worship

- Location within Japan

Religion
- Affiliation: Shinto
- Deity: Amaterasu
- Type: Shikinai Grand Shrine

Location
- Location: Nagao, Katsuragi; Nara, Japan 639-2164
- Interactive map of Nagao Shrine 長尾神社
- Coordinates: 34°30′31.7″N 135°42′37.9″E

Architecture
- Established: unknown

Nagao Shrine (長尾神社, Nagao-jinja) is a Shinto shrine dedicated to the goddesses Amaterasu-ōmikami, Toyouke-ōmikami, Mihikahime-mikoto and Shirakumowake-mikoto. It is located in the city of Katsuragi in Nara Prefecture, Japan.

== Sandō ==
In typical Shinto style the outermost gate, Ichi-no-torii, leads to the second gate, Ni-no-torii, through a 200 meter long path called a sandō.

== Temizusha ==
After crossing the sandō, a traditional Shinto style road, pilgrims to the shrine encounter the Temizusha, a small, roofed structure containing a pool of water for use in ritual purification. The god of this pool is Dragon. Prayers purify their hands and purify their mouths there as a symbolic act to purify the mind and body. The second of two torii gates stands just behind the Temizusha.

== Haiden ==
This spiritual hall for visitors, located just after the second large torii gate, is open to the public for the offering of prayers to the god (Kami), the giving of donations, and the purchase of special talismans of protection, such as amulets (omamori) and hanging scrolls (ofuda).

On special days, one may be invited to a kagura. The miko (shrine maiden) guides into the haiden. Lay down your head totally and Kan-Nushi (Shinto priest) purifies us. After that, Oriental Miko dance in sync with the music playing bell(Suzu), flute (Ryu-teki), taiko, and Gagaku. Urayasu-no-Mai (means 'dance at the seashore') is famous in Nagao shrine. You pass from item by Hatsuho Ryou prayer from Kan-Nushi, the prayer is finished. Especial of one, we can get to commemorate the dish made of earthenware after the reception as a special shrine, Miko serve a sacred Omiki (sake of the gods).

== Matsuri festivals ==
- 1 January - Saitan-Sai (New Year Shinto Festival, Miko)
- 4 March - Onda-Matsuri (Taue praying for the rich harvest, Gokumaki(mochi-maki))
- around 15 July - Natsu-Matsuri (pray for dynamic summer, Karaoke)
- 4 October - YoMiya (for newborn children, Mystic Miko Dance)
- 2 October Saturday and Sunday - Danjiri
- 23 November - Niiname-Sai (thanksgiving day for rich harvest, New Kome)
