= Shimoichi, Nara =

Shimoichi 下市町
- Town
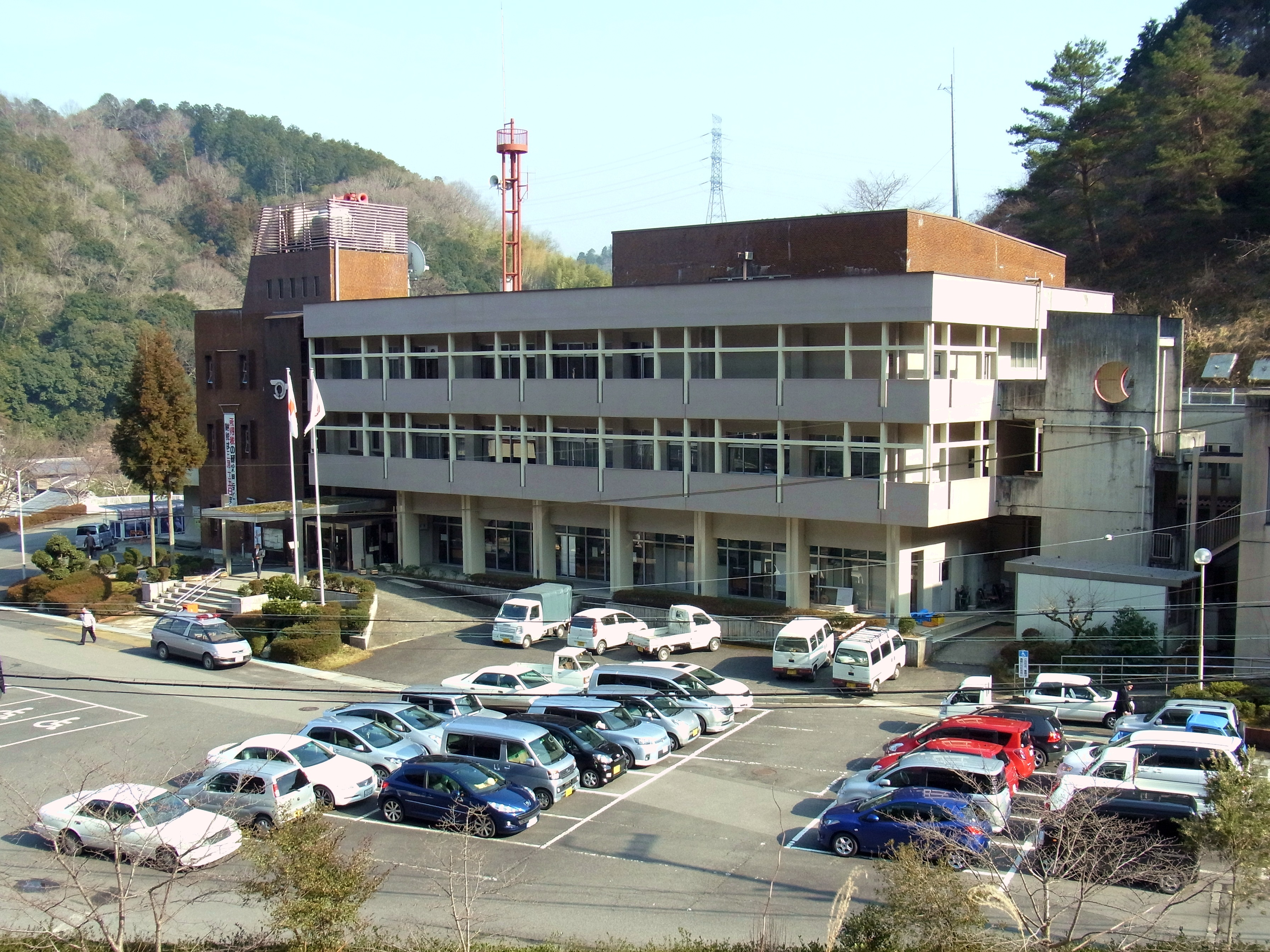
- Shimoichi Town Office

- Flag Chapter
- Location of Shimoichi in Nara Prefecture

- Location in Japan
- Coordinates: 34°21′40″N 135°47′31″E
- Country: Japan
- Region: Kansai
- Prefecture: Nara
- District: Yoshino

Area
  - Total: 61.99 km^{2} (23.93 sq mi)

Population (January 1, 2025)
  - Total: 4,294
  - Density: 69.27/km^{2} (179.4/sq mi)
- Time zone: UTC+09:00 (JST)
- City hall address: 1960 Ōaza Shimoichi, Shimoichi-machi, Nara-ken 638-8510
- Website: Official website
- Symbols
- Flower: Portulaca grandiflora
- Tree: Cryptomeria

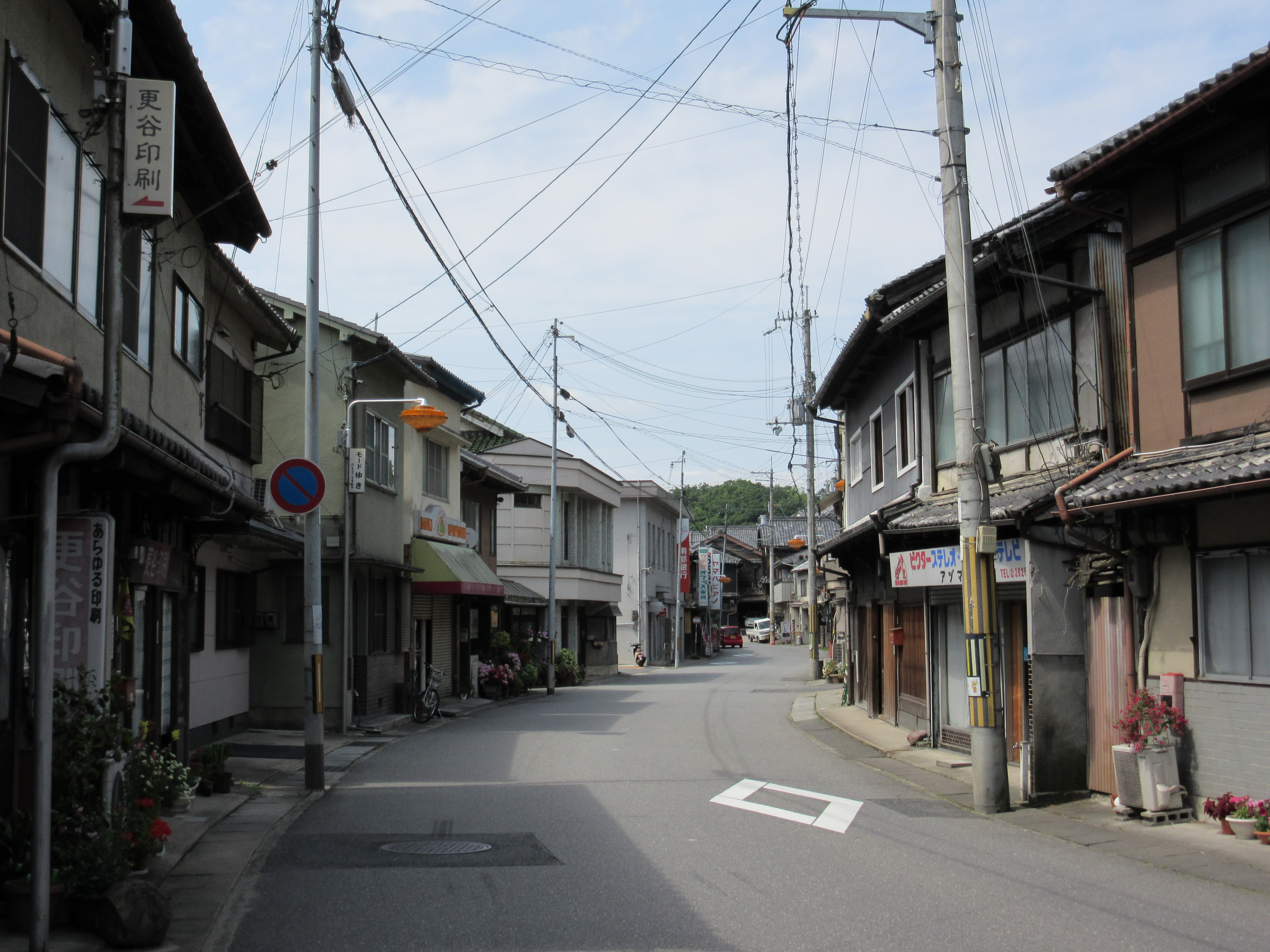
downtown Shimoichi

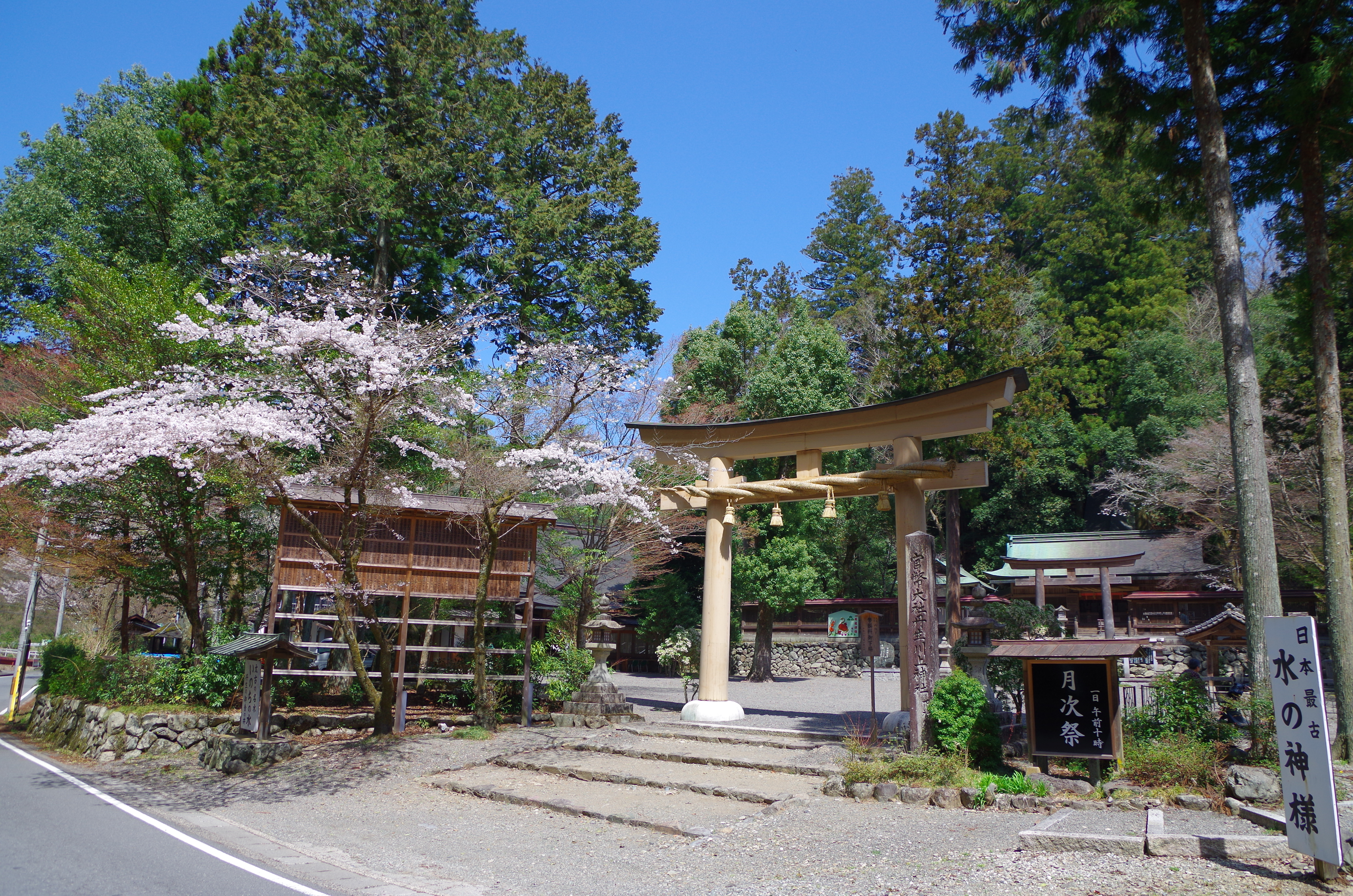
Niukawakami Shrine

Shimoichi (下市町, Shimoichi-chō) is a town in Yoshino District, Nara Prefecture, Japan. As of 1 January 2025, the town had an estimated population of 4,294 and a population density of 69 persons per km^{2}. The total area of the town is 61.99 km^{2} (23.93 sq mi).

== Geography ==
Shimoichi is located in south-central Nara Prefecture. It sits between forested mountains along the Yoshino River.

=== Surrounding municipalities ===
Nara Prefecture

- Gojō
- Kurotaki
- Ōyodo
- Yoshino

=== Climate ===
Shimoichi has a humid subtropical climate (Köppen Cfa) characterized by warm summers and cool winters with light to no snowfall. The average annual temperature in Shimoichi is 12.9 °C. The average annual rainfall is 2119 mm with September as the wettest month. The temperatures are highest on average in August, at around 24.6 °C, and lowest in January, at around 1.4 °C.

=== Demographics ===
Per Japanese census data, the population of Shimoichi is as shown below:

Historical population
Year	Pop.	±%
1950	15,877	—
1960	14,545	−8.4%
1970	12,725	−12.5%
1980	11,460	−9.9%
1990	9,950	−13.2%
2000	8,670	−12.9%
2010	7,020	−19.0%
2020	5,037	−28.2%

== History ==
The area of Shimoichi was part of ancient Yamato Province. It flourished as the gateway to Yoshino from the Heian period, and a market for the Yoshino region. The Tsurube sushi shop, which is featured in the popular kabuki play Yoshitsune Senbon Zakura, still operates today and claims to have existed as far back as the 17th century. The village of Shimoichi was established on April 1, 1889, with the creation of the modern municipalities system. On February 24, 1890 it was raised to town status. Shimoichi annexed the neighboring villages of Nyu and Akino in 1956.

== Government ==
Shimoichi has a mayor-council form of government with a directly elected mayor and a unicameral town council of eight members. Shimoichi, collectively with the other municipalities of Yoshino District, contributes two members to the Nara Prefectural Assembly. In terms of national politics, the village is part of the Nara 3rd district of the lower house of the Diet of Japan.

== Economy ==
The local economy is based on forestry and agriculture. However, the fields are mostly terraced rice fields on sloping land, and the production scale is small due to serious animal damage, so the main purpose is for self-consumption. The area is traditionally noted for its production of konnyaku.

== Education ==
Shimoichi has one public elementary school and one public junior high schools operated by the town government. The town does not have a high school.

The junior high school has over 200 students, and about 30 faculty and staff members. Its mascot is a dragonfly. School clubs include volleyball, chorus, brass band, art, shuji (calligraphy), baseball, track and field, English, and table tennis. The chorus club has a 50-year first-place winning streak. The baseball club also has a good prefectural reputation and was chosen to participate in a prefectural baseball tournament during the 2007-2008 school year.

The Shimoichi Board of Education is a participant in the JET (Japan Exchange and Teaching) Programme. The JET Programme is a Japanese government initiative which aims to promote internationalization in Japan’s local communities by helping to improve foreign language education and developing international exchange at the community level. Shimoichi has two native English speakers who work as Assistant Language Teachers (ALT). One is placed predominantly at Shimoichi Elementary, while the other is placed at Shimoichi Junior High. The junior high school has had an ALT since 1997, while the elementary school first acquired an ALT in 2006.

== Transportation ==
=== Railways ===
Shimoichi has no passenger railway service. The nearest train station is Shimoichiguchi Station on the Kintetsu Yoshino Line in Ōyodo.

=== Highways ===
- National Route 309

== Local attractions ==
- Gangyō-ji
- Niukawakami Shrine

=== Festivals ===
Hatsuichi, which means "first market", is an annual festival in early February. Before supermarkets and other modern conveniences existed, the townspeople gathered every ten days for a market. Hatsuichi marked the first market of the new lunar year. Over time Hatsuichi and the local Ebisu Shrine joined in creating the modern festival. Ebisu is a god of business and one of the seven "lucky gods" derived from China. The Ebisu Shrine is decorated with lanterns, traditional ornaments and colors for the festival, which now marks the annual opening of the shrine. On the afternoon of Hatsuichi a portable shrine is paraded through the town.

In July, the neighboring town of Oyodo hosts the Yoshino-gawa festival, which includes a fireworks display.

In early October, the town holds a sports festival in honor of Japan's national Health and Sports Day. An opening ceremony including fireworks and the lighting of an Olympic-style torch takes place as neighborhoods compete in various games. Prizes are awarded on the neighborhood and town level, and may include items such as bags of rice, bicycles, toaster ovens, heaters, tissues, beer, game systems, and various household items. The town's schools also participate in the event with various dances and performances.

The Aki Matsuri (Fall or Autumn Festival) is held in mid- to late October. Activities include a parade of lanterns and drums down the main street to one of the town's temples near the top of a mountain. The town's bunkasai (cultural festival) also takes place around this time, with numerous performances by townspeople and local school children, as well as displays of calligraphy, pottery, paintings, and flower arrangements by local artists in the town's cultural hall.
