= Fukugami Station =

Railway station in Ōyodo, Nara Prefecture, Japan

Fukugami Station 福神駅
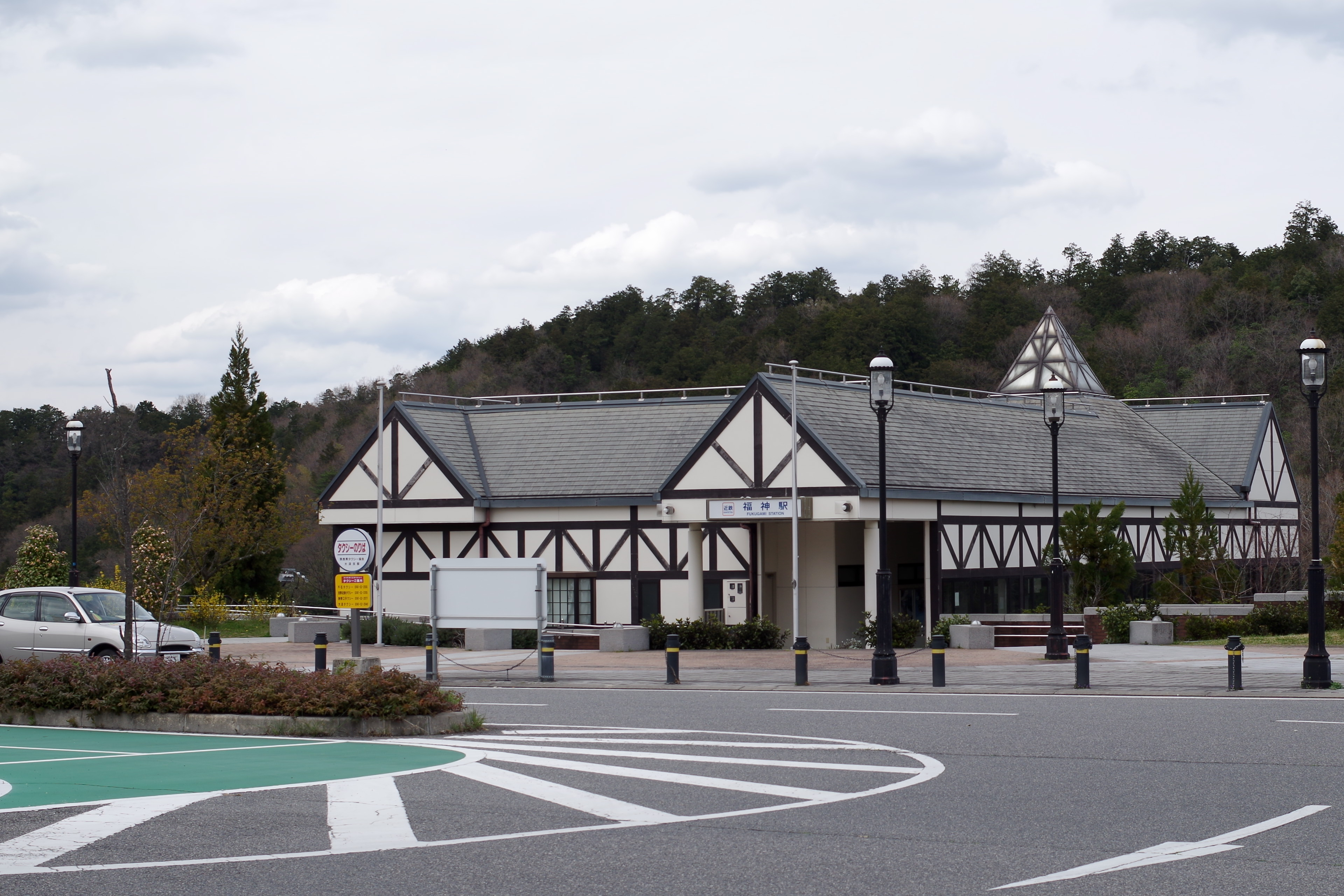
- The station in 2014

General information
- Location: 599-4, Kusurimizu, Ōyodo-cho, Yoshino-gun, Nara-ken 638-0832; Japan
- Coordinates: 34°23′43″N 135°45′01″E
- System: Kintetsu Railway commuter rail station
- Owner: Kintetsu Railway
- Operator: Kintetsu Railway
- Line: F Yoshino Line
- Distance: 12.8 km (8.0 miles)
- Platforms: 2 side platforms
- Tracks: 2
- Train operators: Kintetsu Railway
- Bus stands: 1
- Connections: Gojo City Community Bus: Minami-Nara General Medical Center Ambulatory Line; Oyodo Town Community Bus: Yodori Bus Trunk Route

Construction
- Structure type: At grade
- Parking: None
- Cycle facilities: Available
- Accessible: Yes (2 elevators for the ticket gate and 2 for each platform, 1 accessible bathroom, and equipped wheelchairs)

Other information
- Station code: F50
- Website: www.kintetsu.co.jp/station/station_info/en_station08013.html

History
- Opened: 11 May 1924
- Rebuilt: 1999

Passengers
- 2019: 1374
Services
Preceding station	Kintetsu Railway	Following station
F Yoshino Line
Kusurimizu towards Ōsaka-Abenobashi, Furuichi or Kashiharajingū-mae	Local	Ōada towards Yoshino or Muda
Kusurimizu towards Ōsaka-Abenobashi	Semi-express	Ōada towards Yoshino
Kusurimizu towards Ōsaka-Abenobashi	Express	Ōada towards Yoshino
Yoshinoguchi towards Ōsaka-Abenobashi	Limited Express	Shimoichiguchi towards Yoshino
Yoshinoguchi towards Ōsaka-Abenobashi	Sakura Liner	Shimoichiguchi towards Yoshino
Location
- Location within Nara Prefecture Location within Japan

Fukugami Station (福神駅, Fukugami-eki) is a passenger railway station located in the town of Ōyodo, Yoshino District, Nara Prefecture, Japan. It is operated by the private transportation company, Kintetsu Railway.

== Line ==
Fukugami Station is served by the Yoshino Line and is 12.8 kilometers from the starting point of the line at Kashiharajingū-mae and 52.5 kilometers from Ōsaka Abenobashi.

== Layout ==
The station consists of two opposing side platforms and two tracks. In 1999, when Kintetsu developed a new town around Fukujin Station, the station underwent extensive renovations and was reborn as an elevated station building with a "British pastoral design".The station building is located on the bridge, and is connected to the platform by elevator. The elevator connecting the inside-ticket concourse and the outbound platform is a rare type called an "inside-outside shared type" that also connects the outside-ticket concourse and the east side of the station, and this station was the first in Japan to have one like this.

=== Platforms ===
1	■ F Yoshino Line	for Yoshino
2	■ F Yoshino Line	for Ōsaka Abenobashi

== History ==
The station opened on 11 May 1924 on the Yoshino Railway. The Yoshino Railway merged with the Osaka Electric Tramway on 1 August 1929, which in turn merged with the Sangu Express Railway on 15 March 1941 to form the Kansai Express Railway. The Kansai Express Rail merged with Nankai Railway on 1 June 1944 to form the Kintetsu Railway Yoshino Line

== Passenger statistics ==
In fiscal 2019, the station was used by an average of 1374 passengers daily (boarding passengers only).

== Surrounding area ==
- Hanayoshino Residential Area (Hanayoshino Garden Hills)
- Kintetsu Farm Hanayoshino - An agricultural facility opened in July 2012 as a collaboration between Kintetsu Railway, Marubeni, and Kinki University. The facility's plant factory produces lettuce and other leafy vegetables and radishes, while the agricultural greenhouse produces tomatoes, which are sold as part of the "Vegetables from Hanayoshino" series at Kintetsu Group's Kinsho Stores and supplied as ingredients to hotels and restaurants.

== See also ==
- List of railway stations in Japan
