= Seson-ji =

Buddhist temple in Ōyodo, Nara Prefecture, Japan

- 世尊寺
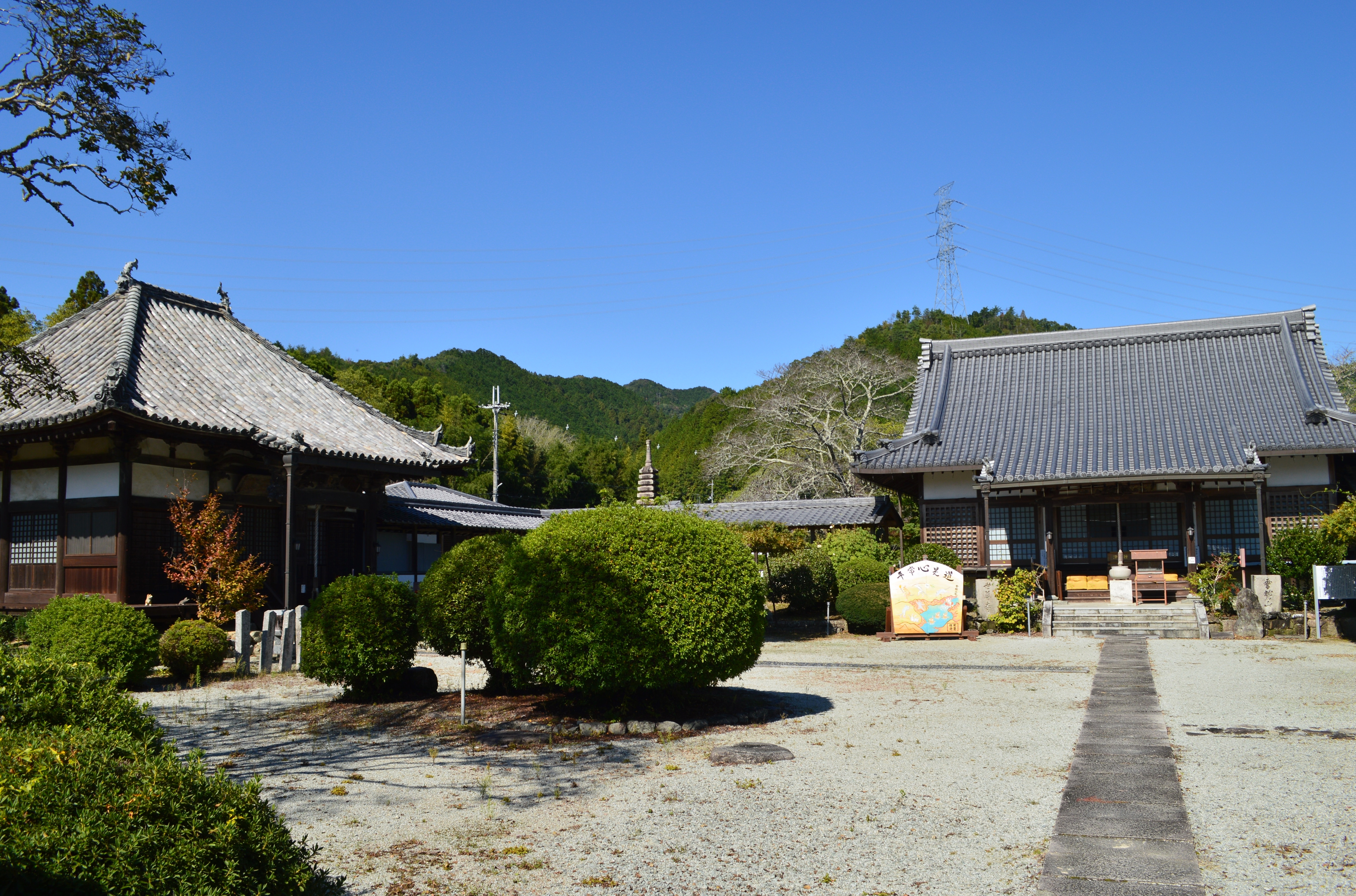
- Seison-ji

- Location within Nara Prefecture Location within Japan

Religion
- Affiliation: Buddhist
- Deity: Amida Nyorai
- Rite: Sōtō
- Status: functional

Location
- Location: 762 Hiso, Oyodo-cho, Yoshino-gun, Nara-ken 639-3128
- Country: Japan
- Coordinates: 34°24′16.7″N 135°49′52.7″E

Architecture
- Founder: c.Prince Shōtoku
- Completed: Asuka period

Website
- Official website
- National Historic Site

Seson-ji (世尊寺) is a Buddhist temple located in the Hiso neighborhood of the town of Ōyodo, Nara Prefecture, Japan. It belongs to the Sōtō school of Japanese Zen and its honzon is a statue of Amida Nyorai. Founded by Prince Shōtoku, it is 7th of the Historical Sites of Prince Shōtoku and the temple precincts have been designated a National Historic Site of Japan in 1927.

== Overview ==
Originally known as Yoshino-ji (吉野寺), the temple is one of the 48 temples said to have been built by Prince Shōtoku during his lifetime. Based on roof tiles found at the temple during archaeological excavations and the Yakushi-ji style layout of the original temple structures (including twin three-story pagodas), the foundation of the temple dates from the Asuka period (late 7th century). During the Nara period, the temple was called was called Yoshino-ji Hiso-san-ji ( 吉野寺比曽比蘇山寺), and was entrusted to the monk Dao-xuan, an immigrant from Tang China. The famous monk Shin'ei from Silla also resided at the temple, and studied the Tripitaka here for 20 years. In the Heian period, the temple was renamed Genko-ji (現光寺), after the legend that its honzon statue of Amida Nyorai and a wooden standing eleven-headed Kannon Bodhisattva statue, were emitting light. This legend is also recorded in the Nihon Shoki, which states that during the reign of Emperor Kinmei a log from a camphor tree which has washed ashore in Izumi Province was shining "like sunlight", so the emperor ordered that a craftsman to make two Buddhist statues, one of which is the Amida at Yoshino-ji. A separate entry in the Nihon Shoki states that during the reign of Empress Suiko a log which emitted light like lightning washed ashore in Tosa Province, and when burned gave off a "wonderful fragrance". This is the first record of agarwood in Japanese chronicles. The empress ordered that a statue of Kannon Bosatsu be carved from this log and enshrined Yoshino-ji. The temple flourished in the Heian period, and was visited by Fujiwara Michinaga, Emperor Seiwa, Emperor Uda and others. However, it gradually fell into decline. It was renamed Hiso-ji (比曽寺) after a reconstruction in 1279, and became a Shingon Risshu temple after restoration by Eison. During the Nanboku-chō period, it was visited by Emperor Go-Daigo, who renamed it Rittenhō-ji (栗天奉寺).

The temple's west pagoda had been destroyed during the wars of the Azuchi-Momoyama period, but the east pagoda, which dates from the end of the Kamakura period remained intact. This structure was dismantled by Toyotomi Hideyoshi in 1594 and relocated to Fushimi Castle. Subsequently, it was relocated again by Tokugawa Ieyasu in 1601 to Mii-dera, where it remains to this day. This structure is an Important Cultural Property. The temple declined again, and was restored with the aid of its sub-temple, Hōrin-ji and converting to the Jōdo sect before Horin-ji was destroyed in a fire in 1731. During the mid-Edo Period (1751), the temple converted to the Sōtō school and became independent of Hōrin-ji.

The Main Hall of the modern temple is built on the site of the Lecture Hall of the ancient temple, the foundation stones of which remain surrounding the modern building. The foundation stones of the east and west pagodas also remain in situ. The temple is located seven minutes by car or 40 minutes on foot from Muda Station or Yamato-Kamiichi Station on the Kintetsu Yoshino Line.

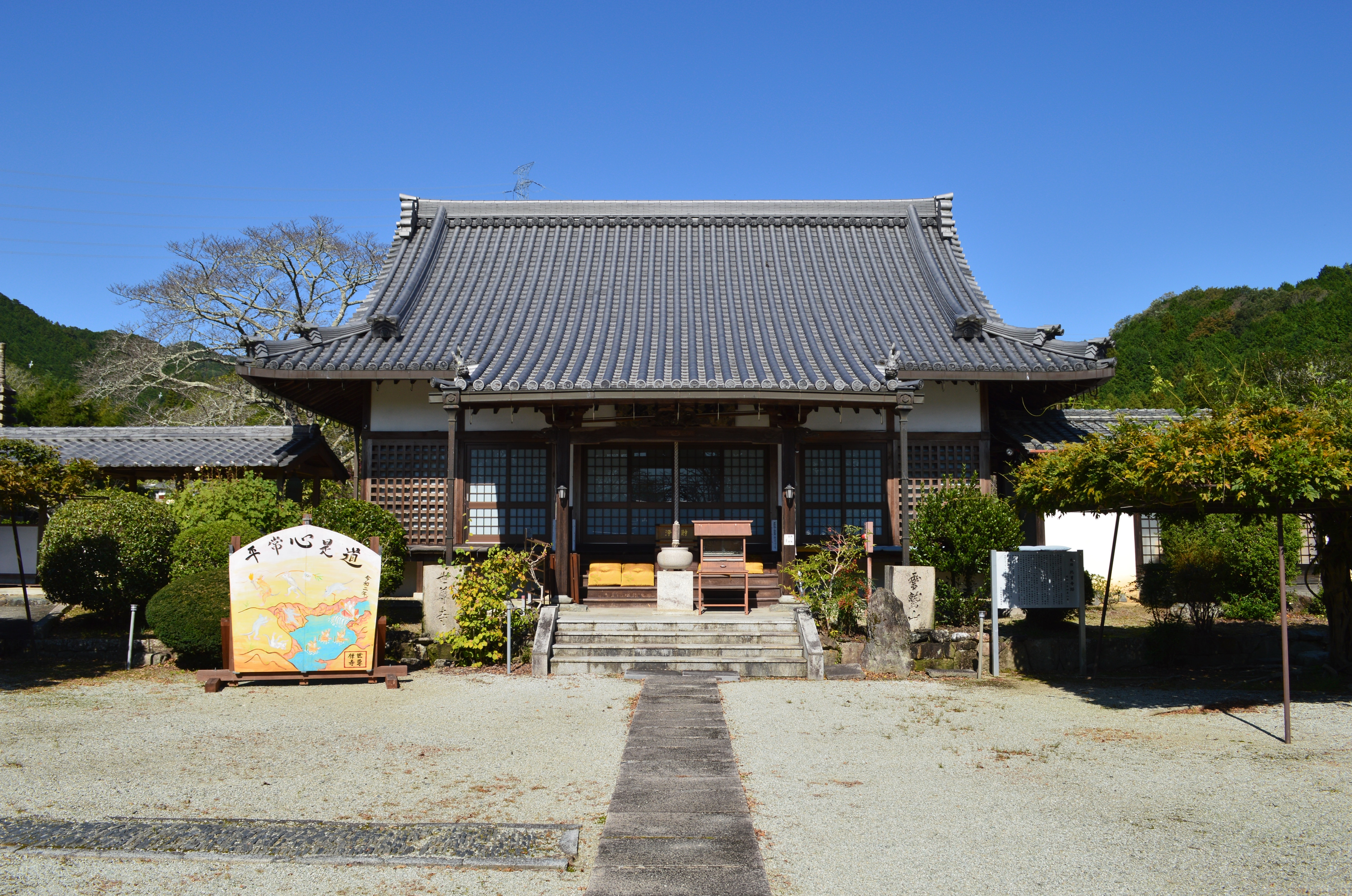
Hondo

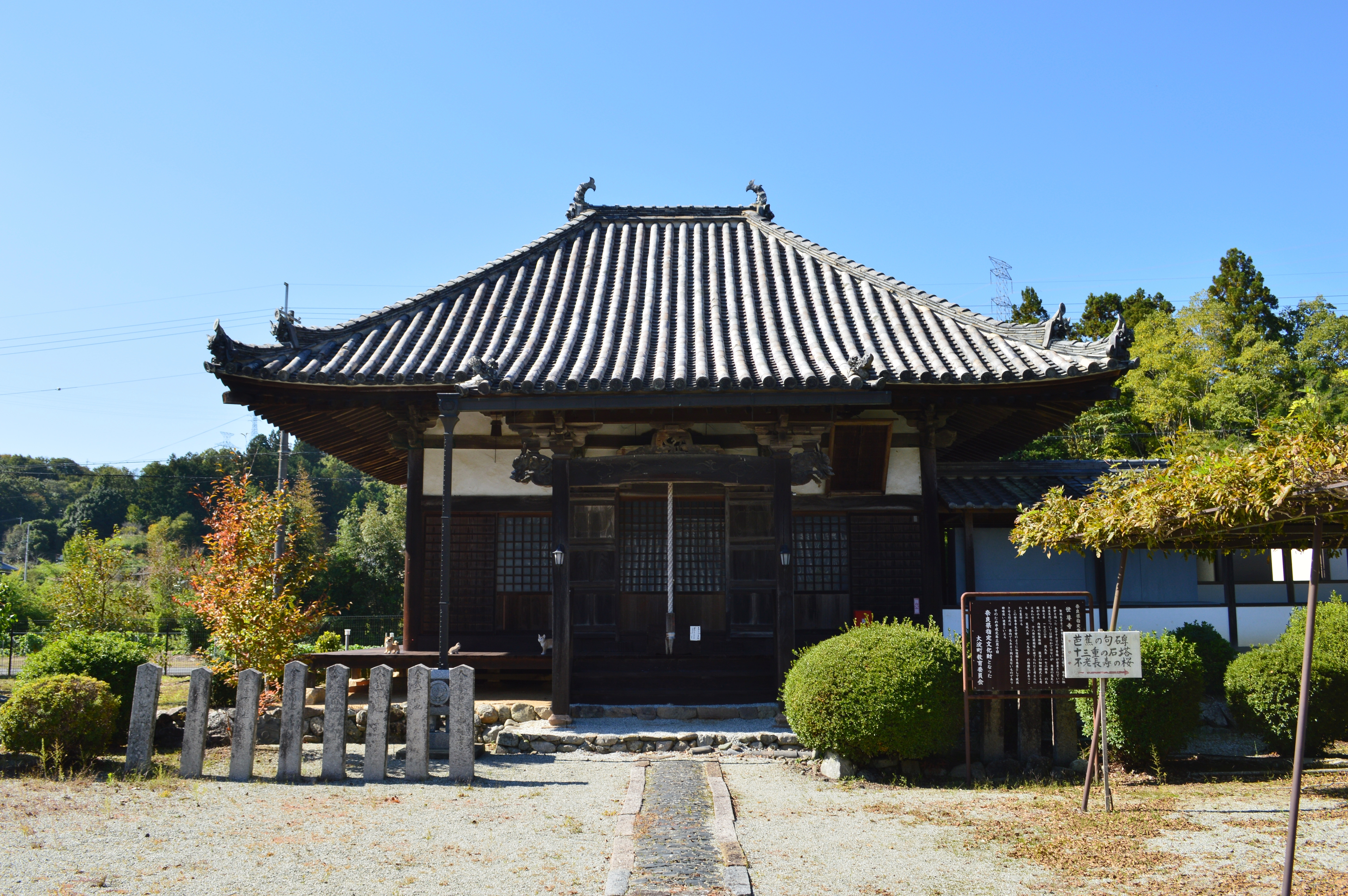
Taishi-do（Nara Prefectural Important Cultural Property）

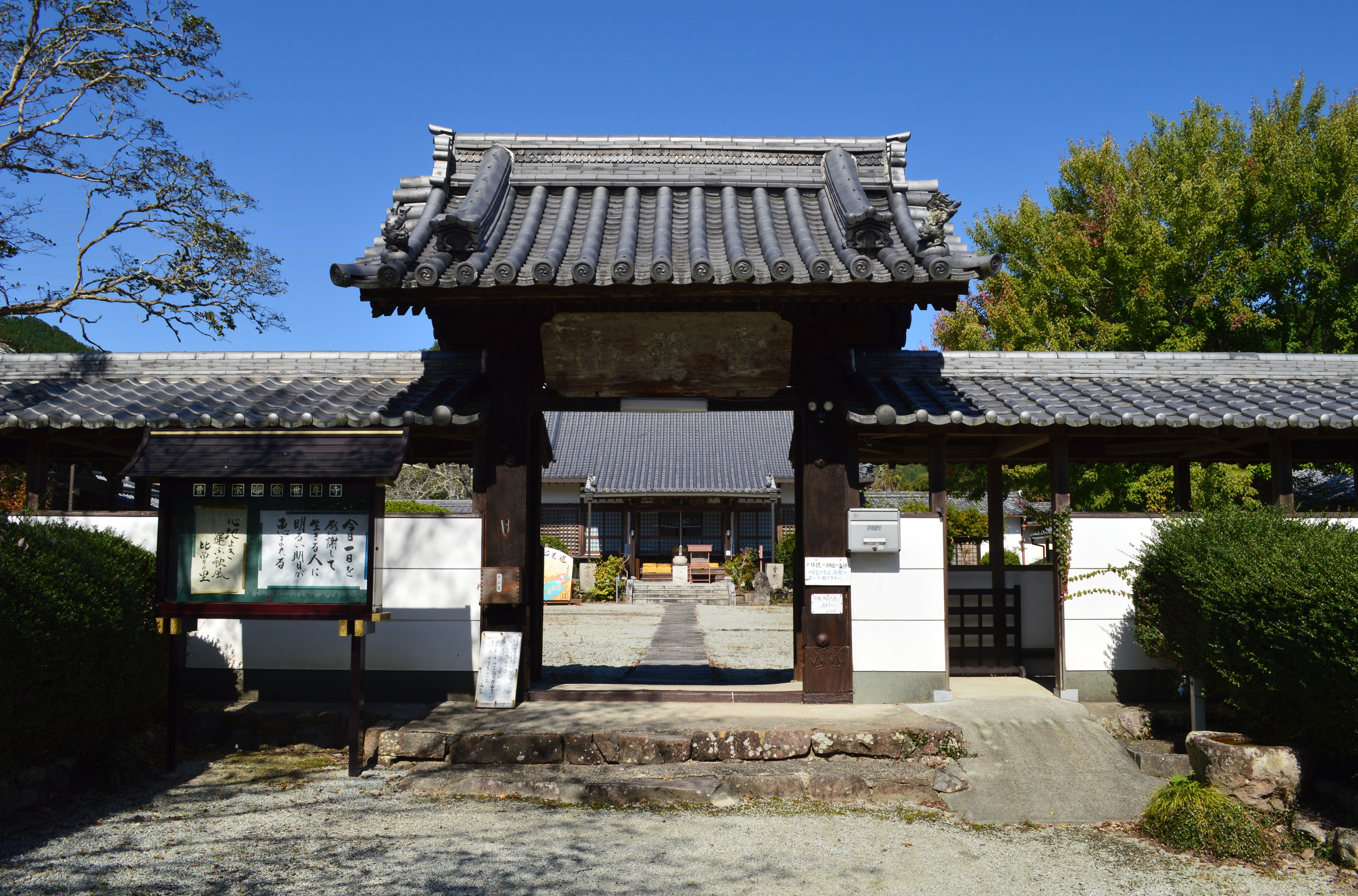
Inner Gate

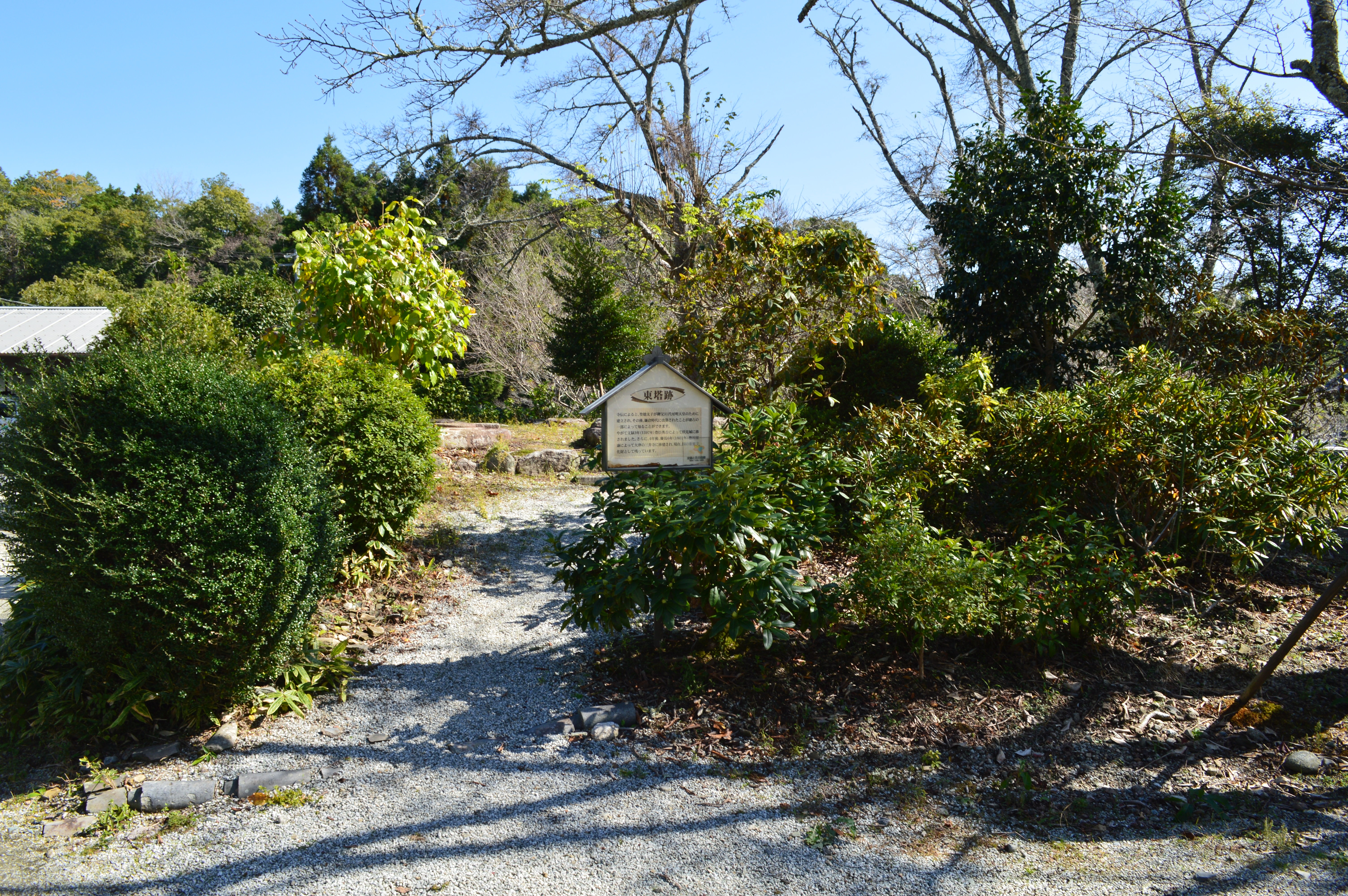
site of the East Pagoda

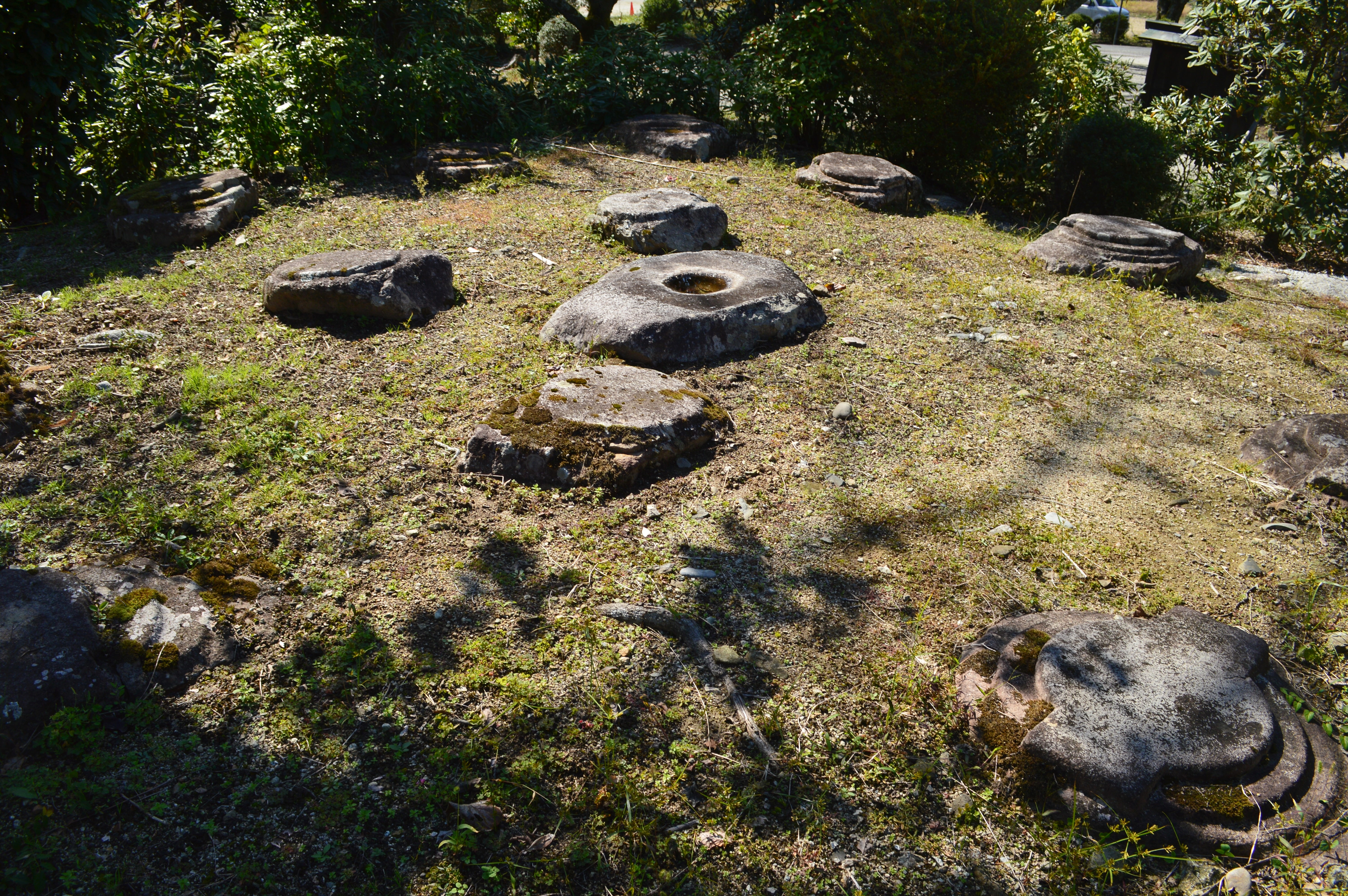
Foundation stones of the East Pagoda

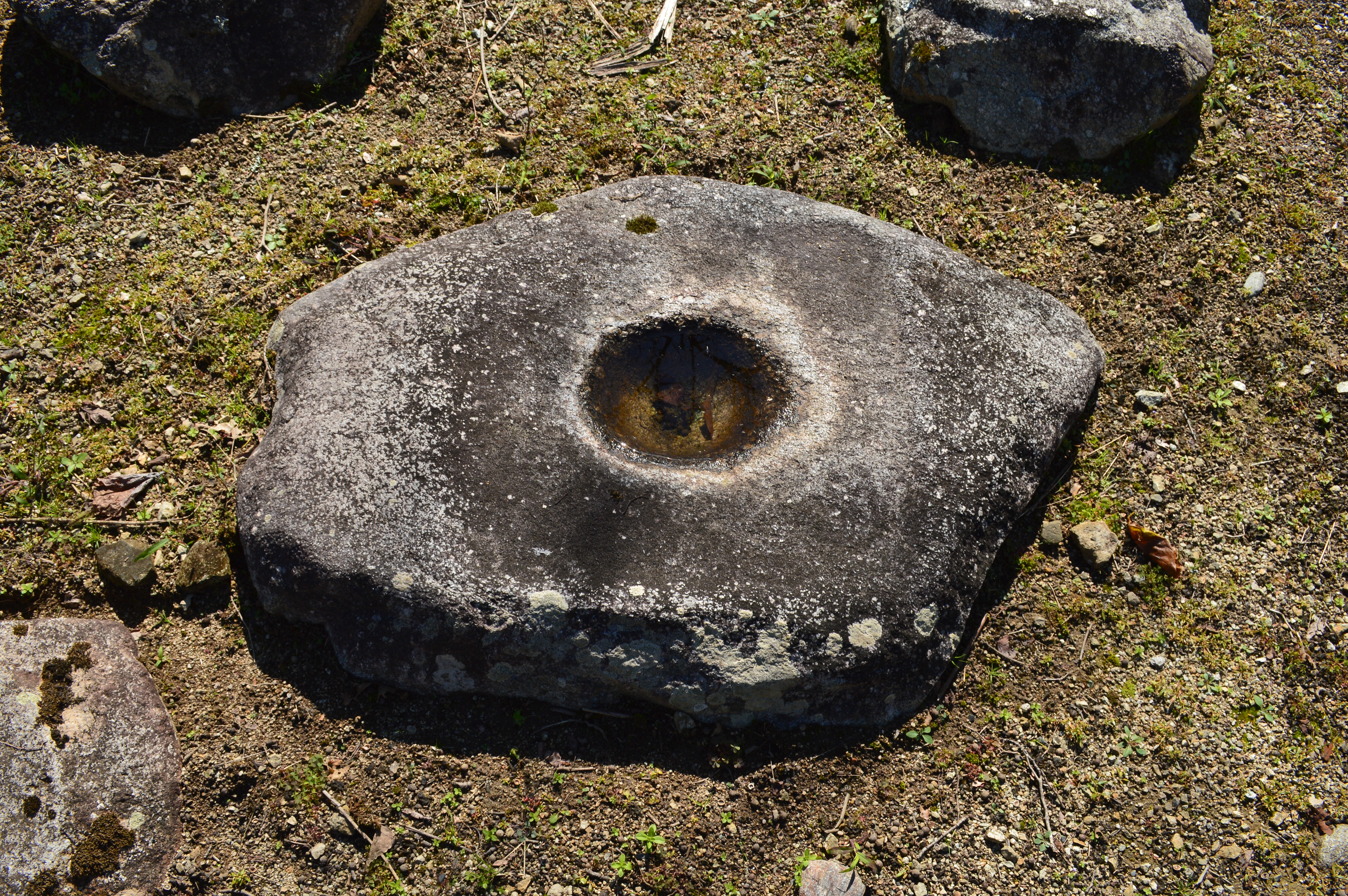
Center foundation for the East Pagoda

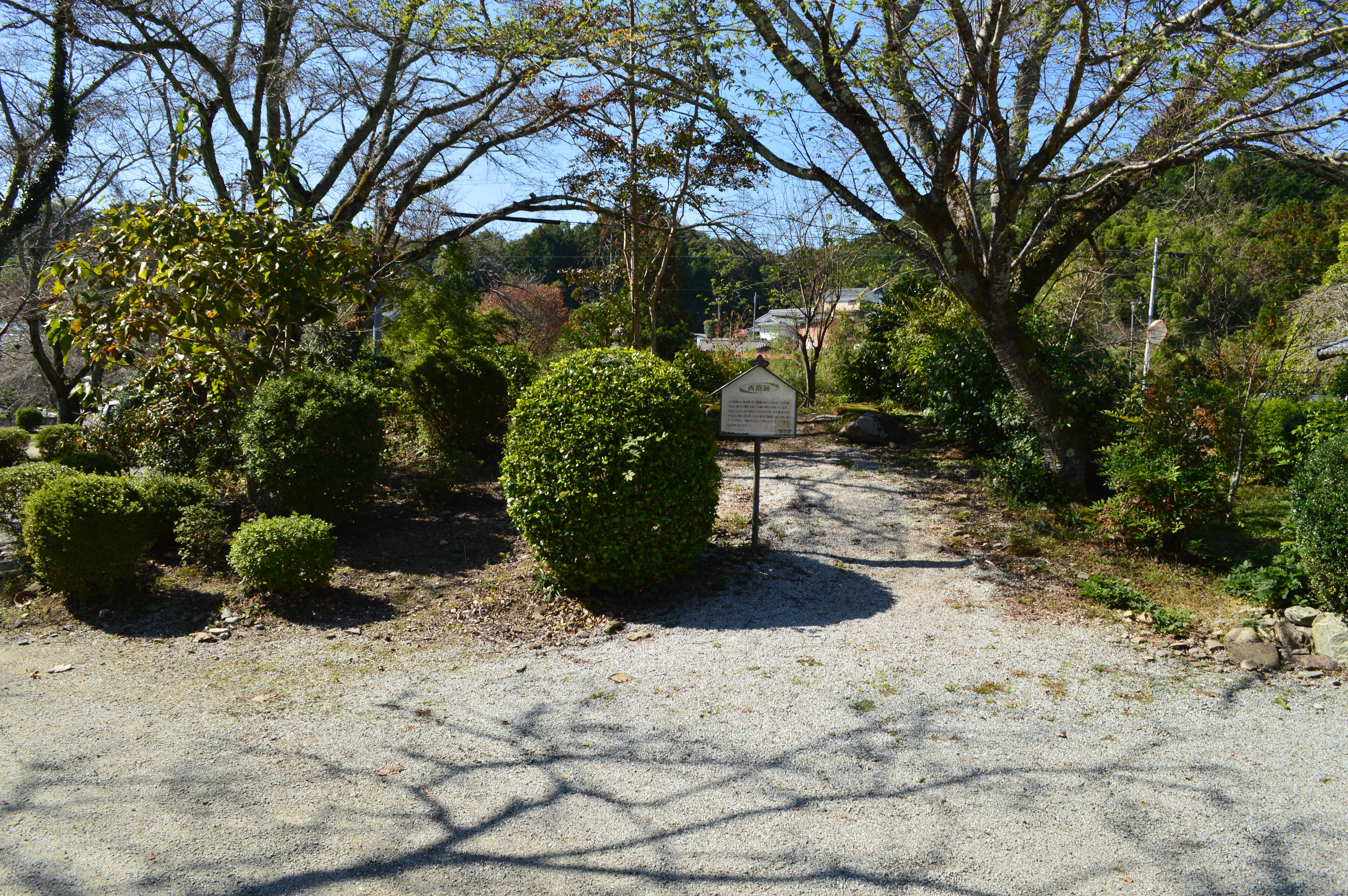
Site of the West Pagoda

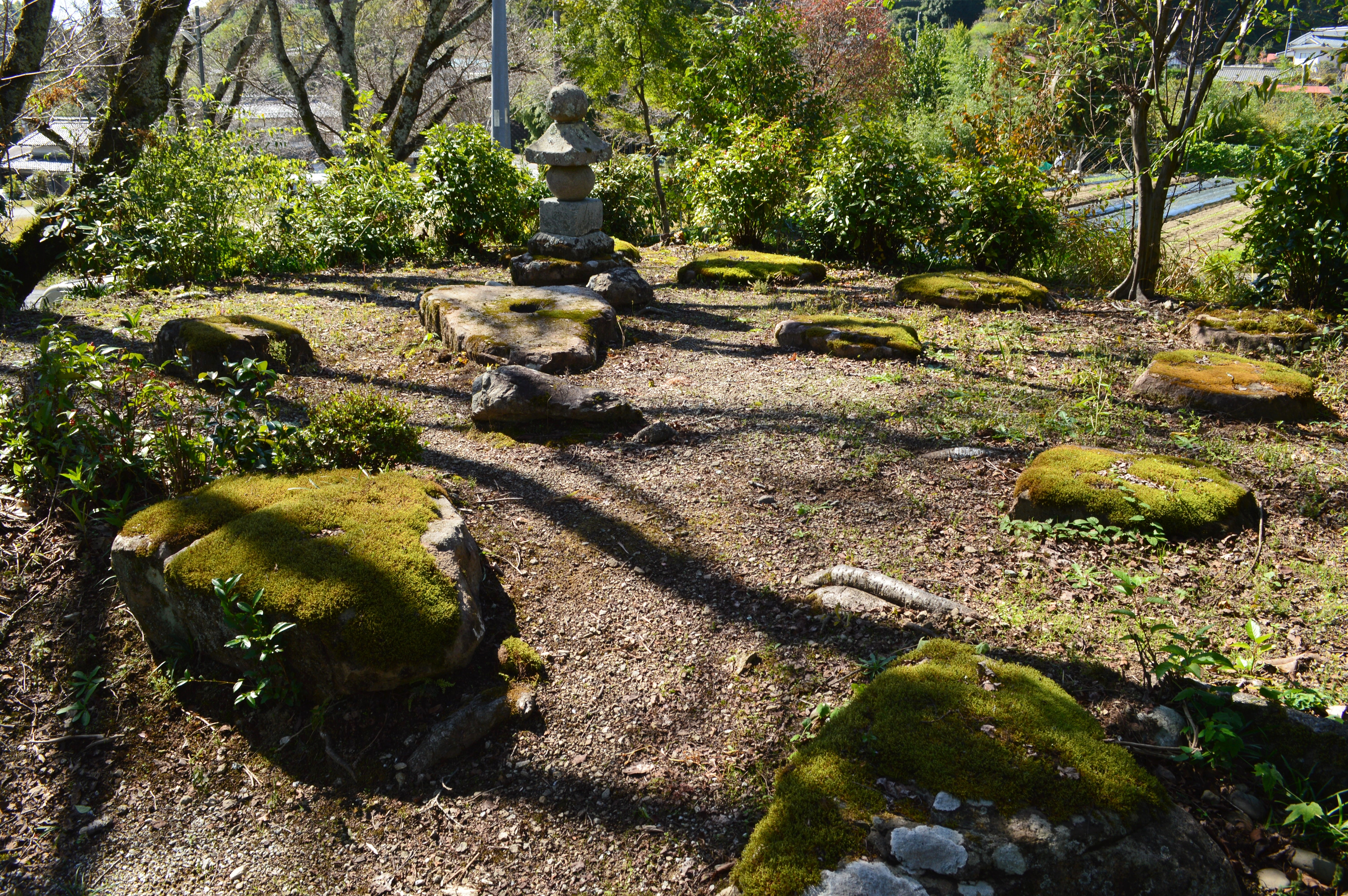
Foundation stones of the West Pagoda

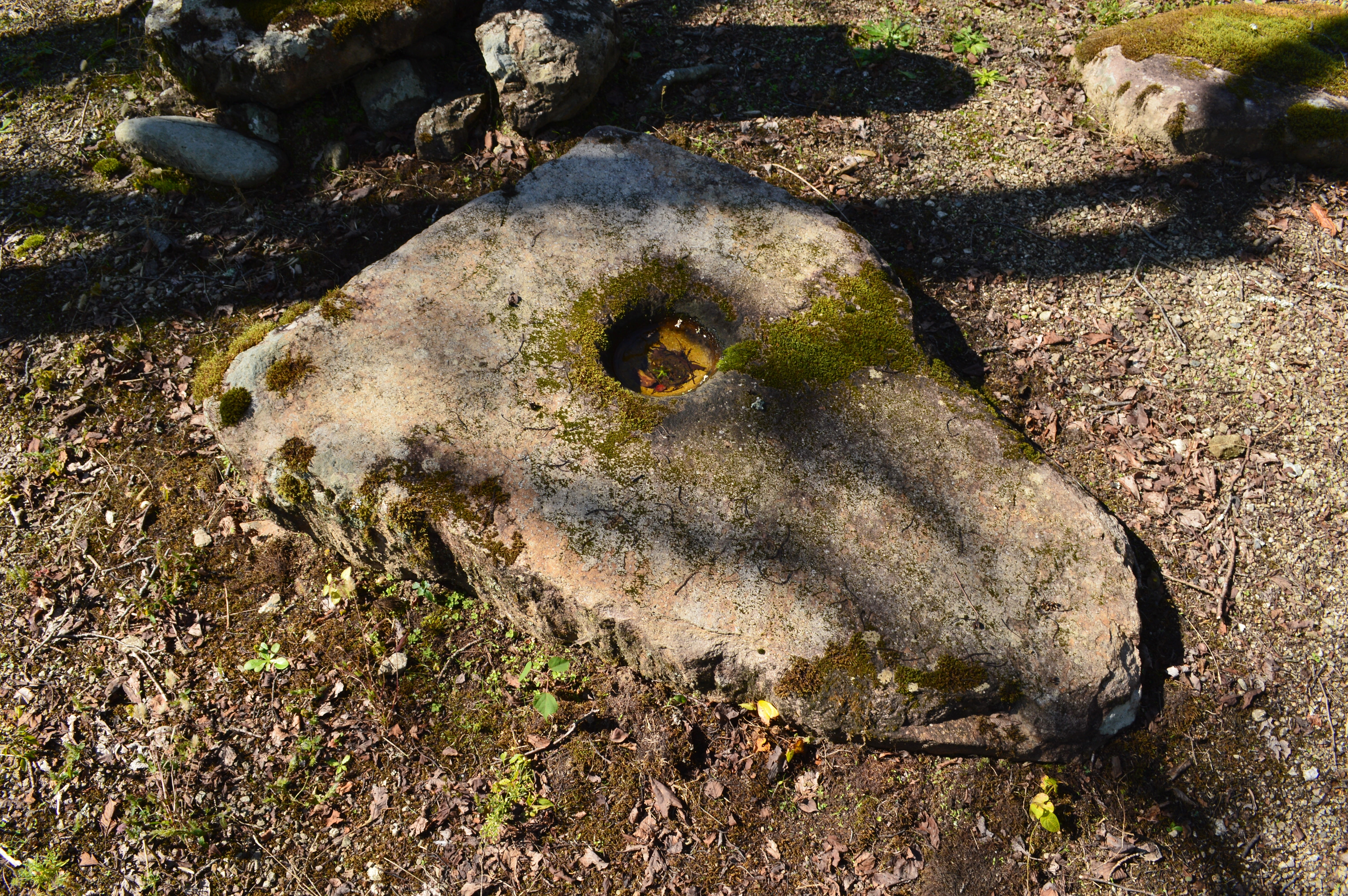
Center foundation for the West Pagoda

== See also ==
- List of Historic Sites of Japan (Nara)
- Historical Sites of Prince Shōtoku
