= Yoshino-Jingū Station =

Railway station in Yoshino, Nara Prefecture, Japan

Yoshino-Jingū Station 吉野神宮駅
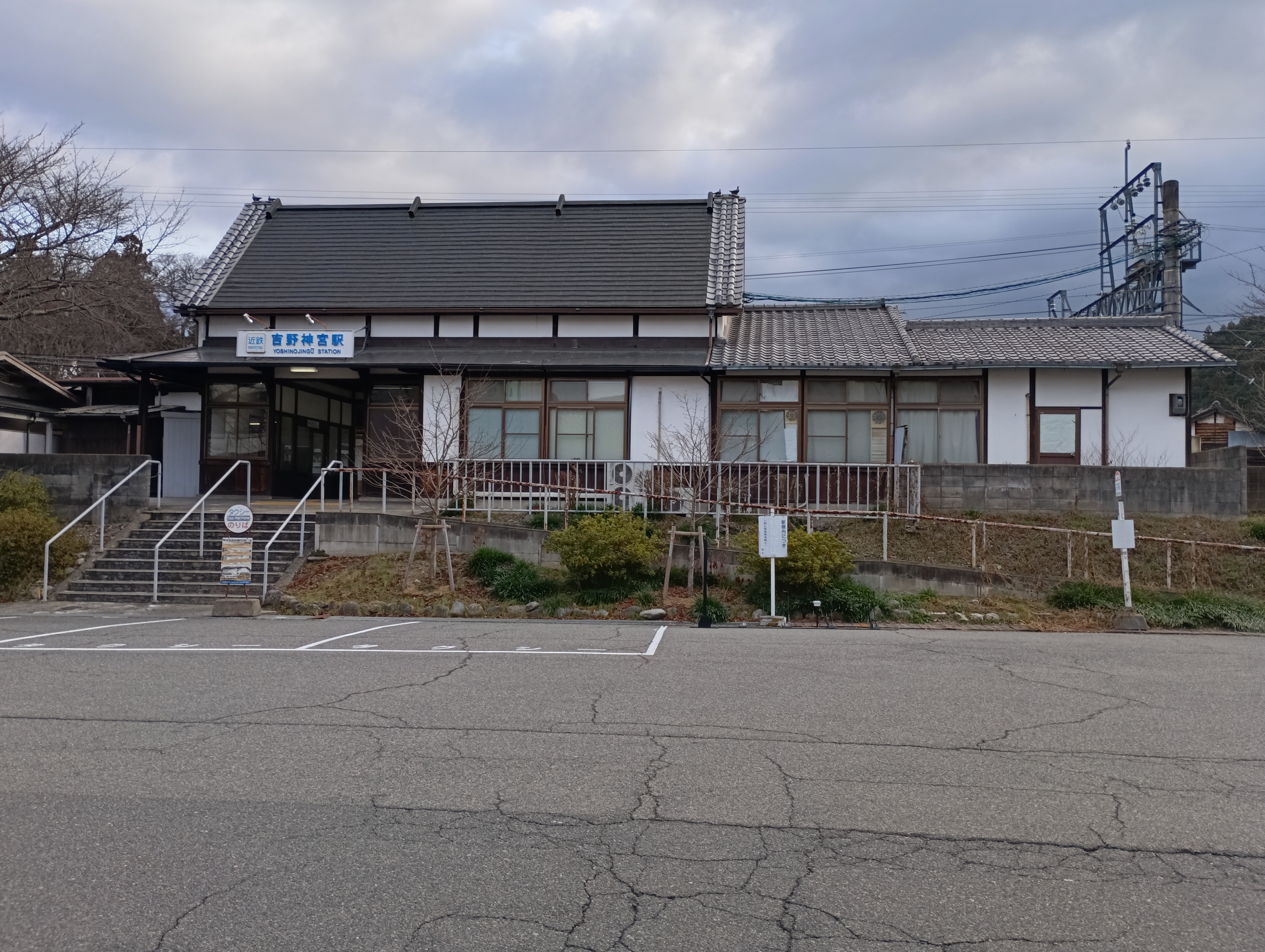
- Yoshino-Jingū Station

General information
- Location: 137-2, Tanji, Yoshino-cho. Yoshino-gun, Nara-ken 639-3114; Japan
- Coordinates: 34°23′25″N 135°50′53″E
- System: Kintetsu Railway commuter rail station
- Owner: Kintetsu Railway
- Operator: Kintetsu Railway
- Line: F Yoshino Line
- Distance: 23.7 km (14.7 miles) from Kashiharajingū-mae
- Platforms: 2 side platforms
- Tracks: 2
- Train operators: Kintetsu Railway
- Bus stands: 1
- Connections: Yoshino Town Community Bus: Smile Bus C Course・D Course

Construction
- Structure type: At grade
- Parking: None
- Cycle facilities: Available
- Accessible: Yes (1 accessible slope for the ticket gate and 2 slopes between the ticket gate and the southbound platform)

Other information
- Station code: F56
- Website: www.kintetsu.co.jp/station/station_info/en_station08019.html

History
- Opened: 25 March 1928

Passengers
- 2019: 240
Services
Preceding station	Kintetsu Railway	Following station
F Yoshino Line
Yamato-Kamiichi towards Ōsaka-Abenobashi, Furuichi or Muda	Local	Yoshino Terminus
Yamato-Kamiichi towards Ōsaka-Abenobashi	Semi-express	Yoshino Terminus
Yamato-Kamiichi towards Ōsaka-Abenobashi	Express	Yoshino Terminus
Yamato-Kamiichi towards Ōsaka-Abenobashi	Limited Express	Yoshino Terminus
Yamato-Kamiichi towards Ōsaka-Abenobashi	Sakura Liner	Yoshino Terminus
Location
- Location within Nara Prefecture Location within Japan

Yoshino-Jingū Station (吉野神宮駅, Yoshino-Jingū-eki) is a passenger railway station located in the town of Yoshino, Nara Prefecture, Japan. It is operated by the private transportation company, Kintetsu Railway.

== Lines ==
Yoshino-Jingū Station is served by the Yoshino Line and is 23.7 kilometers from the starting point of the line at Kashiharajingū-mae and 63.4 kilometers from Ōsaka Abenobashi.

== Layout ==
The station is a ground-level station with two opposing side platforms connected by a level crossing. The effective length of the platform is four cars. The station building is located on the west side of the inbound platform. The station is unattended.

=== Platforms ===
1	■ Yoshino Line	for Yoshino
2	■ Yoshino Line	for Kashihara-Jingumae, Furuichi and Osaka Abenobashi

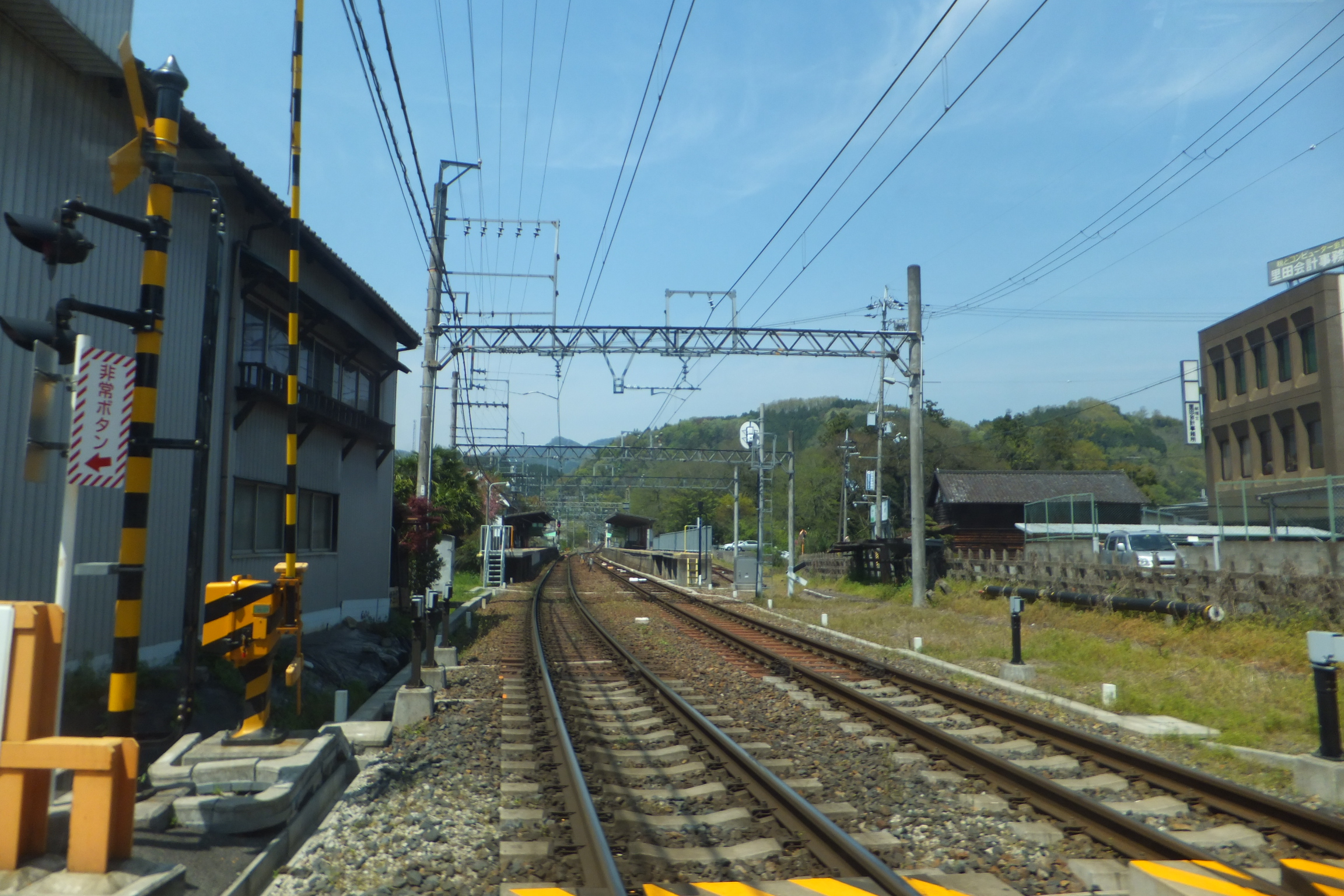
Platforms

== History ==
Yoshino-Jingū Station was opened on March 25, 1928, on the Yoshino Railway. On August 1, 1928, the line merged with the Osaka Electric Tramway, which was merged with the Sangu Express Railway on March 15, 1941, to become the Kansai Express Railway. The Kansai Express Railway merged with the Nankai Railway to form Kintetsu on June 1, 1944.

== Connections ==
- Yoshino Town Community Bus (Smile Bus)

for Yoshino Hospital, Mount Yoshino

== Passenger statistics ==
In fiscal 2019, the station was used by an average of 240 passengers daily (boarding passengers only).

== Surrounding area ==
- Yoshino Shrine
- Nara Prefectural Nara Minami High School Yoshino Campus
- Yoshino Town Yoshino Elementary School

== See also ==
- List of railway stations in Japan
