= Ōada Station =

Railway station in Ōyodo, Nara Prefecture, Japan

Ōada Station 大阿太駅
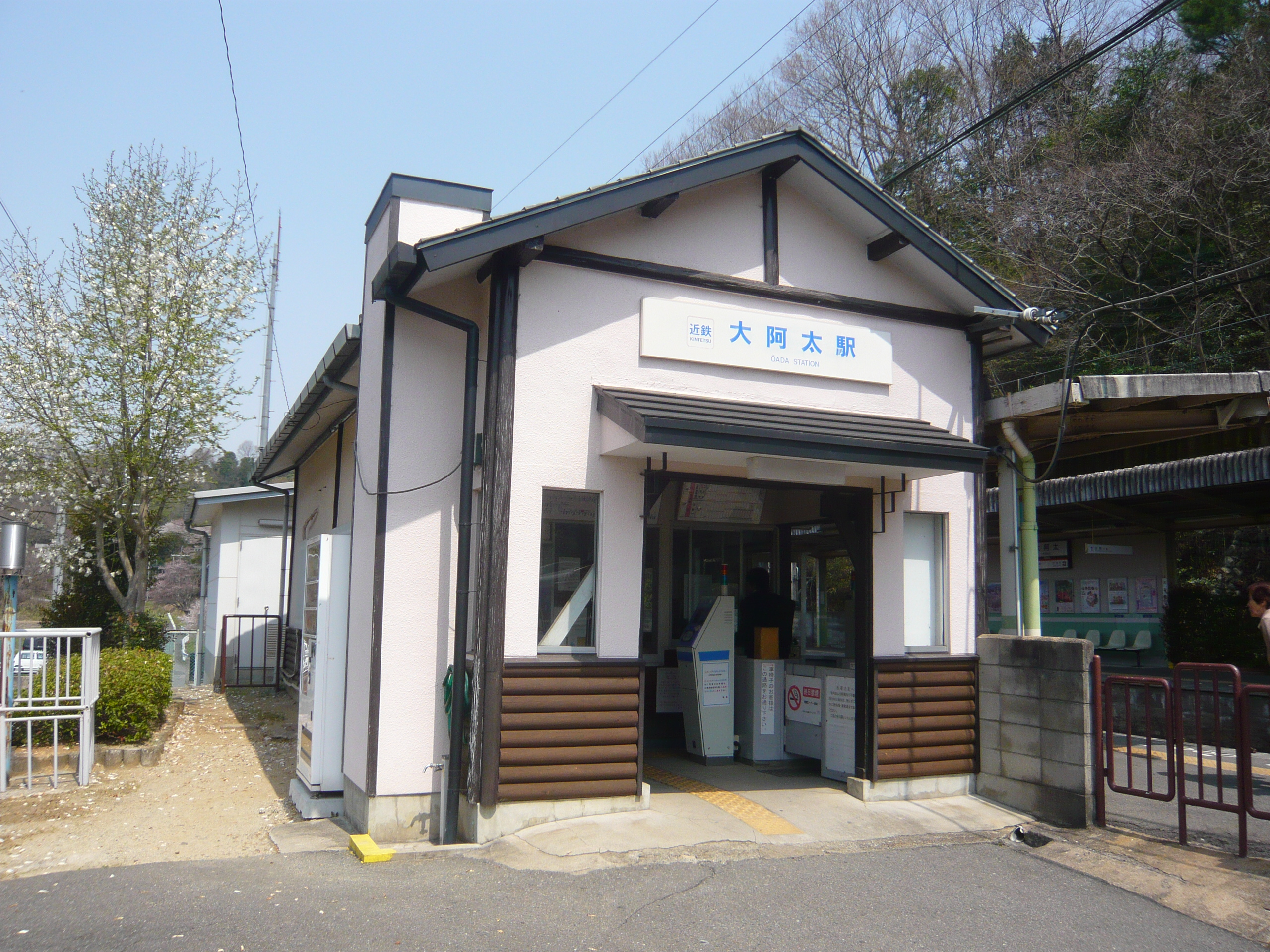

General information
- Location: 1066, Sanate, Ōyodo-cho, Yoshino-gun, Nara-ken 638-0831; Japan
- Coordinates: 34°23′18″N 135°45′59″E
- System: Kintetsu Railway commuter rail station
- Owner: Kintetsu Railway
- Operator: Kintetsu Railway
- Line: F Yoshino Line
- Distance: 14.6 km (9.1 miles)
- Platforms: 2 side platforms
- Tracks: 2
- Train operators: Kintetsu Railway
- Connections: None

Construction
- Structure type: At grade
- Parking: None
- Cycle facilities: Available
- Accessible: Yes (1 accessible slope for the ticket gate and 2 slopes between the ticket gate and the southbound platform)

Other information
- Station code: F51
- Website: www.kintetsu.co.jp/station/station_info/en_station08014.html

History
- Opened: 31 March 1929

Passengers
- 2019: 53
Services
Preceding station	Kintetsu Railway	Following station
F Yoshino Line
Fukugami towards Ōsaka-Abenobashi, Furuichi or Kashiharajingū-mae	Local	Shimoichiguchi towards Yoshino or Muda
Fukugami towards Ōsaka-Abenobashi	Semi-express	Shimoichiguchi towards Yoshino
Fukugami towards Ōsaka-Abenobashi	Express	Shimoichiguchi towards Yoshino
Location
- Location within Nara Prefecture Location within Japan

Ōada Station (大阿太駅, Ōada-eki) is a passenger railway station located in the town of Ōyodo, Yoshino District, Nara Prefecture, Japan. It is operated by the private transportation company, Kintetsu Railway.

== Line ==
Ōada Station is served by the Yoshino Line and is 14.6 kilometers from the starting point of the line at Kashiharajingū-mae and 54.3 kilometers from Ōsaka Abenobashi.

== Layout ==
The station ground-level station with two opposing side platforms and two tracks. The effective length of the platform is long enough for four cars. The station building is on the Yoshino side of the outbound platform, and is connected to the inbound platform by a level crossing.

=== Platforms ===
1	■ F Yoshino Line	for Yoshino
2	■ F Yoshino Line	for Ōsaka Abenobashi

== History ==
The station opened on 31 March 1929 when the Yoshino Railway. The Yoshino Railway merged with the Osaka Electric Tramway on 1 August 1929, which in turn merged with the Sangu Express Railway on 15 March 1941 to form the Kansai Express Railway. The Kansai Express Rail merged with Nankai Railway on 1 June 1944 to form the Kintetsu Railway Yoshino Line

== Passenger statistics ==
In fiscal 2019, the station was used by an average of 53 passengers daily (boarding passengers only).

== Surrounding area ==
There is not a single house in front of the station. This is because the station is located between the village on the south side of the station and the orchards and tourist pear farms on the Oata Plateau on the north side of the station. It was located in this location due to topographical reasons.

== See also ==
- List of railway stations in Japan
