= Koshibe Station =

Railway station in Ōyodo, Nara Prefecture, Japan

Koshibe Station 越部駅
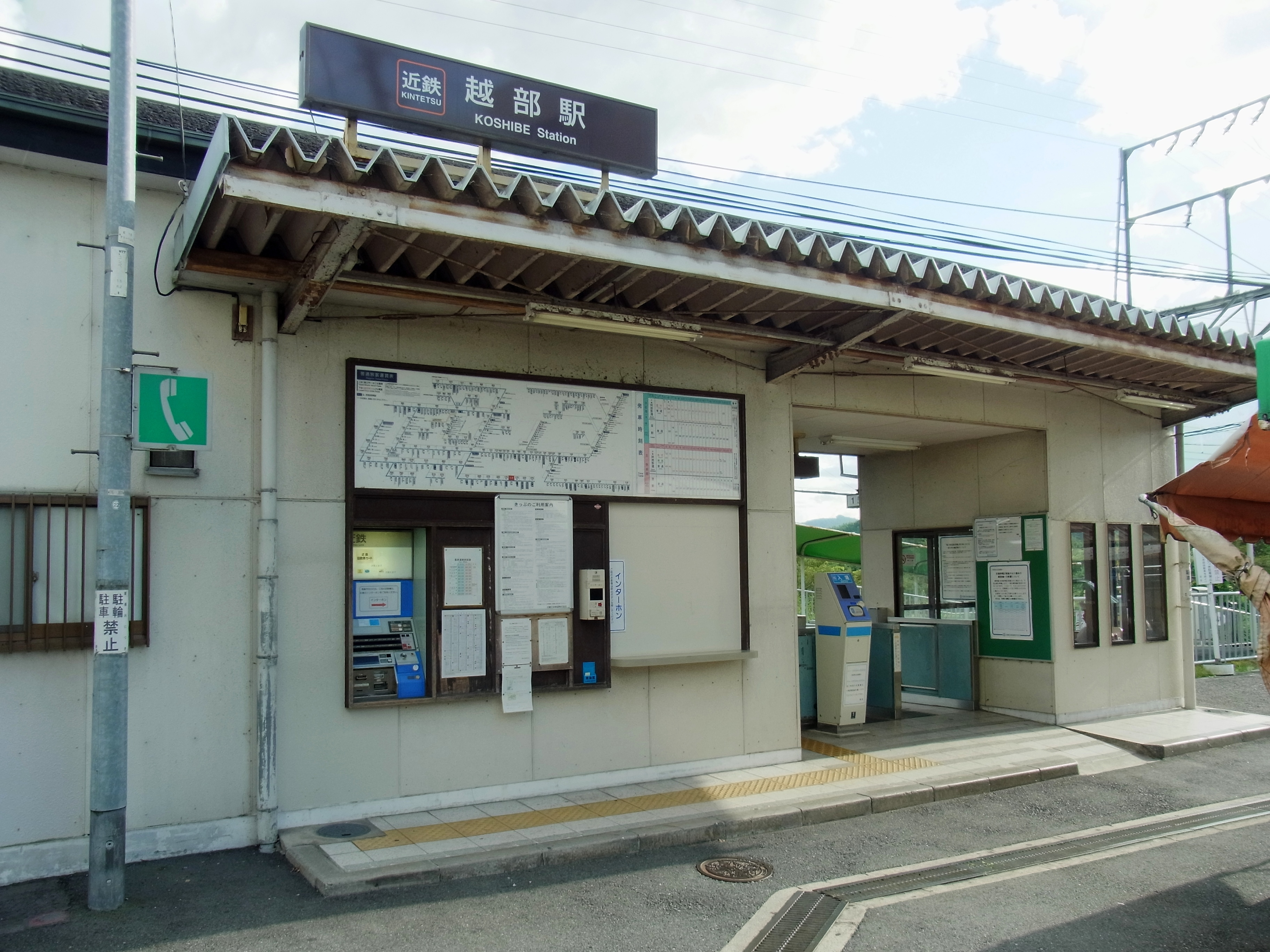
- Koshibe station 2012

General information
- Location: 4, Koshibe, Ōyodo-cho, Yoshino-gun, Nara-ken 638-0803; Japan
- Coordinates: 34°23′10″N 135°48′10″E
- System: Kintetsu Railway commuter rail station
- Owner: Kintetsu Railway
- Operator: Kintetsu Railway
- Line: F Yoshino Line
- Distance: 18.7 km (11.6 miles)
- Platforms: 2 side platforms
- Tracks: 2
- Train operators: Kintetsu Railway
- Connections: Oyodo Town Community Bus: Yodori Bus Trunk Route・Circular Route

Construction
- Structure type: At grade
- Parking: None
- Cycle facilities: Available
- Accessible: Yes (1 accessible slope for the ticket gate and 2 slopes between the ticket gate and the northbound platform)

Other information
- Station code: F53
- Website: www.kintetsu.co.jp/station/station_info/en_station08016.html

History
- Opened: 1 July 1927; 99 years ago

Passengers
- 2019: 308
Services
Preceding station	Kintetsu Railway	Following station
F Yoshino Line
Shimoichiguchi towards Ōsaka-Abenobashi, Furuichi or Kashiharajingū-mae	Local	Muda towards Yoshino
Shimoichiguchi towards Ōsaka-Abenobashi, Furuichi or Kashiharajingū-mae	Local	Muda Terminus
Shimoichiguchi towards Ōsaka-Abenobashi	Semi-express	Muda towards Yoshino
Shimoichiguchi towards Ōsaka-Abenobashi	Express	Muda towards Yoshino
Location
- Location within Nara Prefecture Location within Japan

Koshibe Station (越部駅, Koshibe-eki) is a passenger railway station located in the town of Ōyodo, Yoshino District, Nara Prefecture, Japan. It is operated by the private transportation company, Kintetsu Railway.

== Line ==
Koshibe Station is served by the Yoshino Line and is 18.7 kilometers from the starting point of the line at Kashiharajingū-mae and 58.4 kilometers from Ōsaka Abenobashi.

== Layout ==
The station ground-level station with two opposing side platforms and two tracks. The effective length of the platform is long enough for four cars. The station building is on the Kashihara side of the outbound platform, and is connected to the inbound platform by a level crossing. The Koshibe River flows underneath the platform (merging with the Yoshino River just south of it).

=== Platforms ===
1	■ F Yoshino Line	for Yoshino
2	■ F Yoshino Line	for Ōsaka Abenobashi

== History ==
The station opened on 1 July 1927 when the Yoshino Railway. The Yoshino Railway merged with the Osaka Electric Tramway on 1 August 1929, which in turn merged with the Sangu Express Railway on 15 March 1941 to form the Kansai Express Railway. The Kansai Express Rail merged with Nankai Railway on 1 June 1944 to form the Kintetsu Railway Yoshino Line

== Passenger statistics ==
In fiscal 2019, the station was used by an average of 308 passengers daily (boarding passengers only).

== Surrounding area ==
- Minamiyamato New Town
- Japan National Route 169

== See also ==
- List of railway stations in Japan
