= Ōyodo, Nara =

Ōyodo 大淀町
- Town
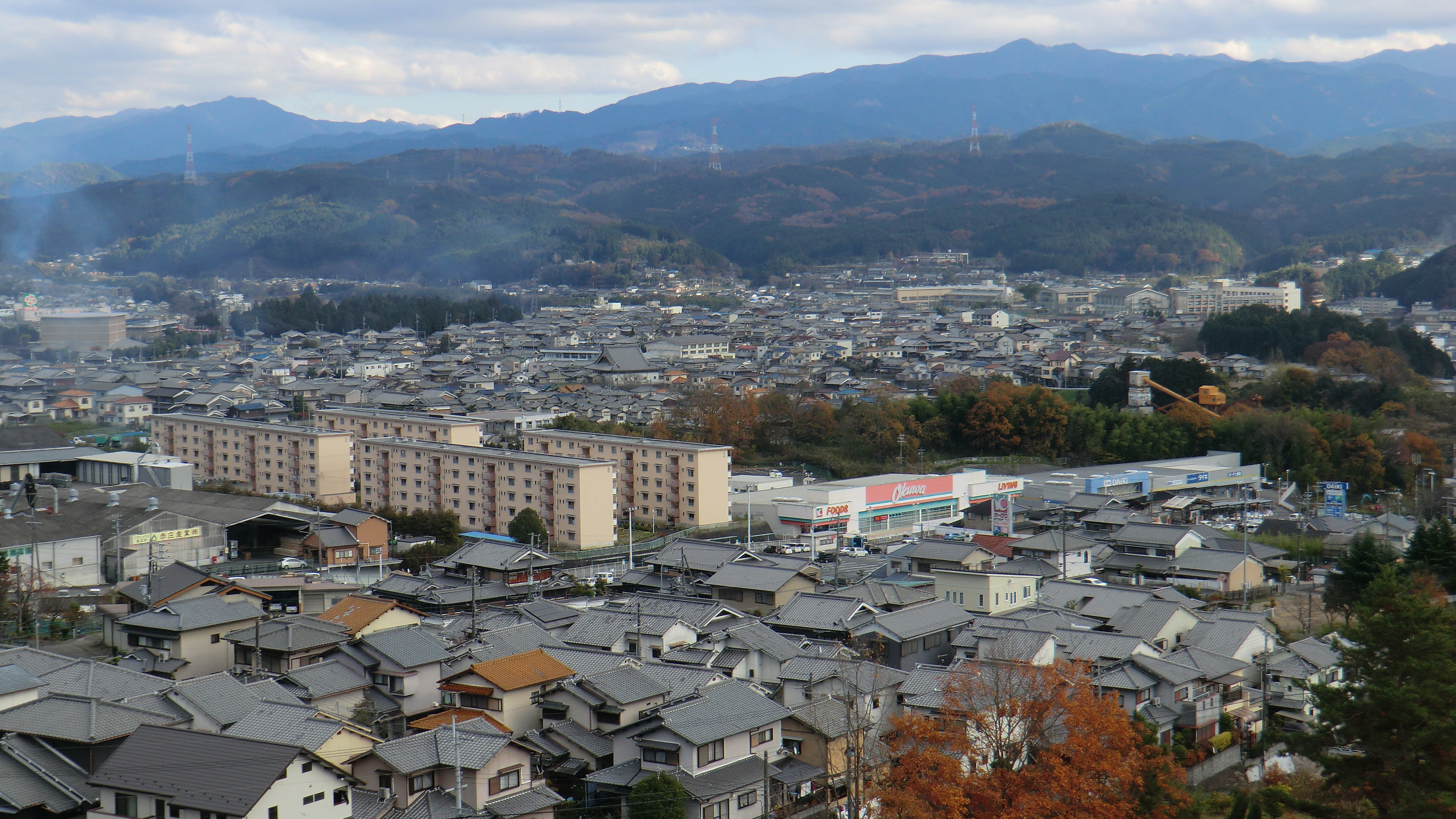
- View of Oyodo Town

- Flag Chapter
- Location of Ōyodo in Nara Prefecture

- Location in Japan
- Coordinates: 34°23′26″N 135°47′23″E
- Country: Japan
- Region: Kansai
- Prefecture: Nara
- District: Yoshino

Government
  - Mayor: Morimasa Okashita

Area
  - Total: 38.10 km^{2} (14.71 sq mi)

Population (October 31, 2024)
  - Total: 15,856
  - Density: 416.2/km^{2} (1,078/sq mi)
- Time zone: UTC+09:00 (JST)
- City hall address: 2090 Hinokakimoto, Ōyodo-machi, Nara-ken >638-8501
- Website: Official website
- Symbols
- Flower: Pyrus pyrifolia
- Tree: Cyclobalanopsis glauca

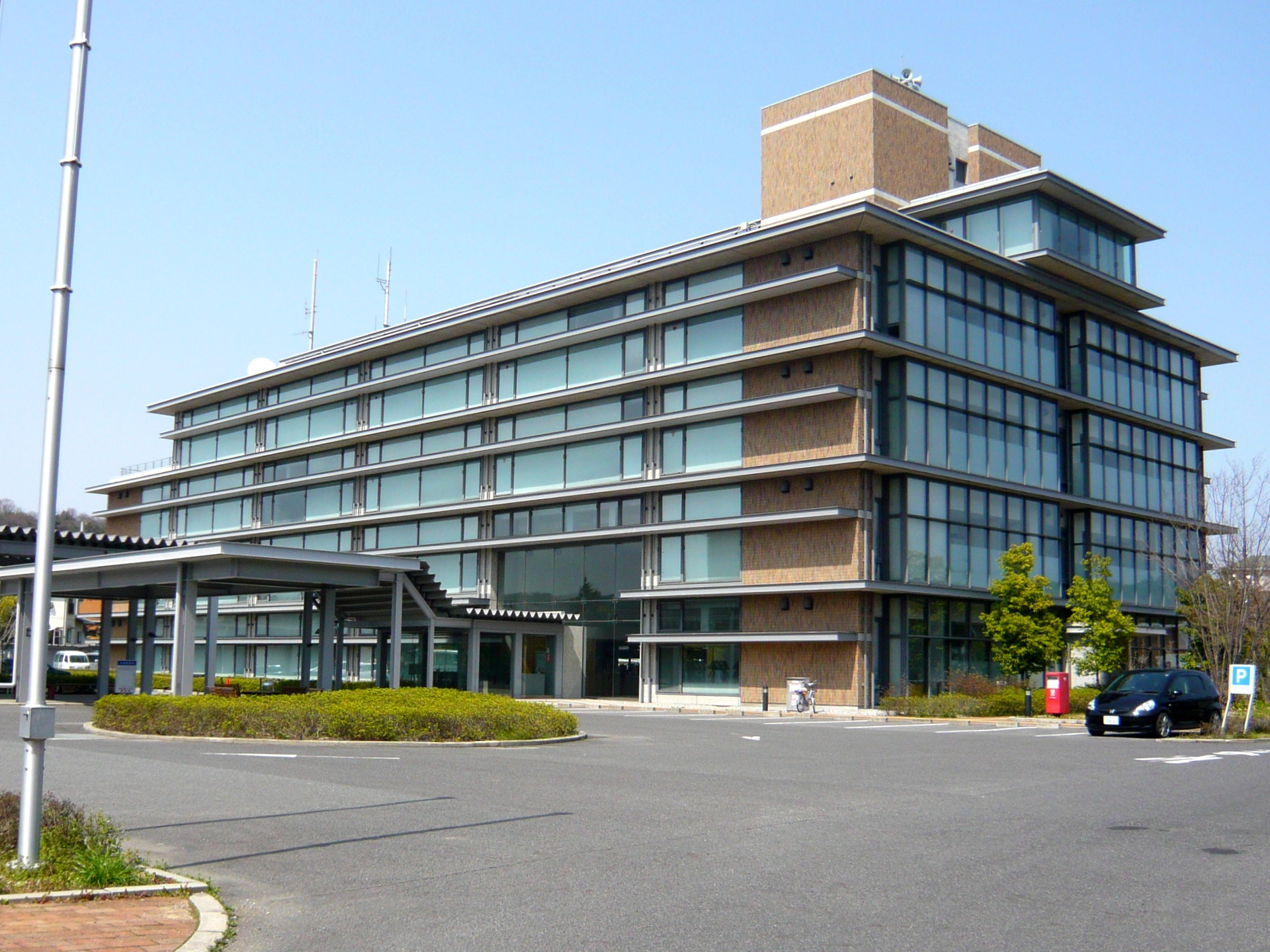
Ōyodo town hall

Ōyodo (大淀町, Ōyodo-chō) is a town located in Yoshino District, Nara Prefecture, Japan. As of 31 October 2024, the town had an estimated population of 15,856 in 7364 households, and a population density of 420 persons per km^{2}. The total area of the town is 38.10 km^{2} (14.71 sq mi).

== Geography ==
Ōyodo is located on the right bank of the Yoshino River in central Nara Prefecture, almost in the center of the Kii Peninsula.

=== Surrounding municipalities ===
Nara Prefecture

- Gojō
- Gose
- Shimoichi
- Takatori
- Yoshino

=== Climate ===
Ōyodo has a humid subtropical climate (Köppen Cfa) characterized by warm summers and cool winters with light to no snowfall. The average annual temperature in Ōyodo is 14.0 °C. The average annual rainfall is 1636 mm with September as the wettest month. The temperatures are highest on average in August, at around 25.9 °C, and lowest in January, at around 2.4 °C.

=== Demographics ===
Per Japanese census data, the population of Ōyodo is as shown below

Historical population
| Year | Pop. | ±% |
|---|---|---|
| 1950 | 14,533 | — |
| 1960 | 15,114 | +4.0% |
| 1970 | 15,930 | +5.4% |
| 1980 | 16,510 | +3.6% |
| 1990 | 18,633 | +12.9% |
| 2000 | 20,376 | +9.4% |
| 2010 | 19,176 | −5.9% |
| 2020 | 16,728 | −12.8% |

== History ==
The area of Ōyodo was part of ancient Yamato Province. The village of Ōyodo was established on April 1, 1889 with the creation of the modern municipalities system. It was raised to town status on February 11, 1921. In 1952, Ōyodo annexed neighboring Ōada village.

== Government ==
Ōyodo has a mayor-council form of government with a directly elected mayor and a unicameral town council of 12 members. Ōyodo, collectively with the other municipalities of Yoshino District, contributes two members to the Nara Prefectural Assembly. In terms of national politics, the town is part of the Nara 3rd district of the lower house of the Diet of Japan.

== Economy ==
The local economy is based on agriculture, with pears as the local speciality The town is increasingly a commuter town for the greater Osaka metropolis.

== Education ==
Ōyodo has three public elementary schools and one public junior high school operated by the town government and two public high schools operated by the Nara Prefectural Board of Education.

== Transportation ==
=== Railways ===
Kintetsu Railway - Yoshino Line

Kusurimizu - Fukugami - Ōada - Shimoichiguchi - Koshibe - Muda

=== Highways ===
- National Route 169
- National Route 309
- National Route 370

== Local attractions ==
- Seson-ji, National Historic Site
