= Yamato-Kamiichi Station =

Railway station in Yoshino, Nara Prefecture, Japan

Yamato-Kamiichi Station 大和上市駅
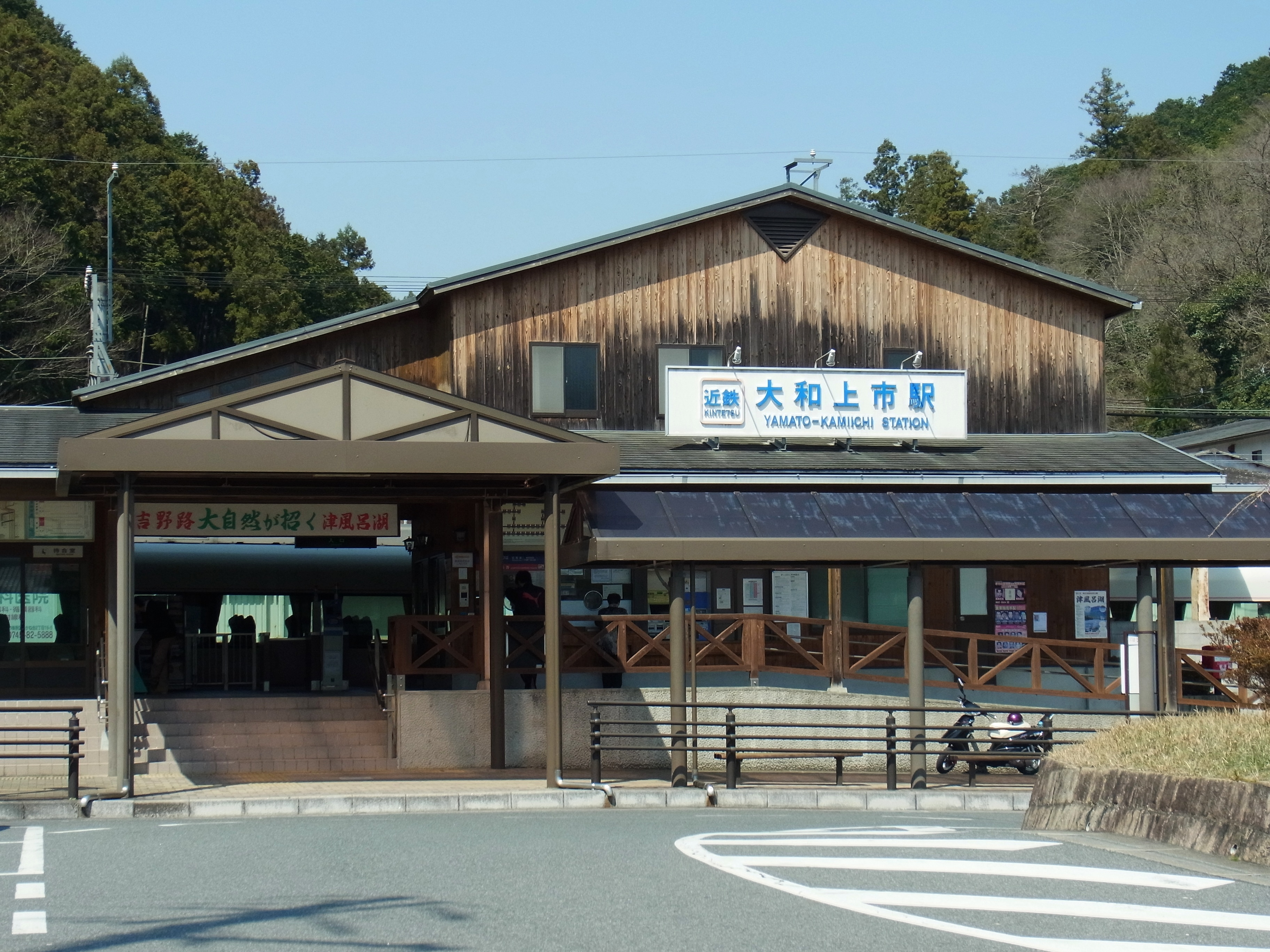
- Kintetsu Yoshino Line Yamato-Kamiichi Station

General information
- Location: 2044, Kamiichi, Yoshino-cho, Yoshino-gun, Nara-ken 639-3111; Japan
- Coordinates: 34°23′44″N 135°50′44″E
- System: Kintetsu Railway commuter rail station
- Owner: Kintetsu Railway
- Operator: Kintetsu Railway
- Line: F Yoshino Line
- Distance: 22.9 km (14.2 miles) from Kashiharajingū-mae
- Platforms: 1 side platforms
- Tracks: 1
- Train operators: Kintetsu Railway
- Bus stands: 1
- Connections: Nara Kotsu Bus Lines: Tokkyū (Limited Express)・Bun (School)・R169 Yūyū Bus (Southern Regional Cooperation Community Bus) at Kamiichi-eki; Oyodo Town Community Bus: Yodori Bus Trunk Route at Kamiichi-eki; Yoshino Town Community Bus: Smile Bus Ryūmon Circular Route・Kamiichi Circular Route・A Course・B Course・Yamabuki Bus at Kamiichi-eki

Construction
- Structure type: At grade
- Parking: None
- Cycle facilities: Available
- Accessible: Yes (1 accessible slope for the platform)

Other information
- Station code: F55
- Website: www.kintetsu.co.jp/station/station_info/en_station08018.html

History
- Opened: 25 March 1928

Passengers
- 2019: 266
Services
Preceding station	Kintetsu Railway	Following station
F Yoshino Line
Muda towards Ōsaka-Abenobashi or Furuichi	Local	Yoshinojingū towards Yoshino
Muda Terminus	Local	Yoshinojingū towards Yoshino
Muda towards Ōsaka-Abenobashi	Semi-express	Yoshinojingū towards Yoshino
Muda towards Ōsaka-Abenobashi	Express	Yoshinojingū towards Yoshino
Muda towards Ōsaka-Abenobashi	Limited Express	Yoshinojingū towards Yoshino
Muda towards Ōsaka-Abenobashi	Sakura Liner	Yoshinojingū towards Yoshino
Location
- Location within Nara Prefecture Location within Japan

Yamato-Kamiichi Station (大和上市駅, Yamato-Kamiichi-eki) is a passenger railway station located in the town of Yoshino, Nara Prefecture, Japan. It is operated by the private transportation company, Kintetsu Railway.

== Lines ==
Yamato-Kamiichi Station is served by the Yoshino Line and is 22.9 kilometers from the starting point of the line at Kashiharajingū-mae and 62.6 kilometers from Ōsaka Abenobashi.

== Layout ==
The station is a ground-level station with a single side platform and one track. The station building is on the south side, and the effective length of the platform is four cars. The station is unattended.

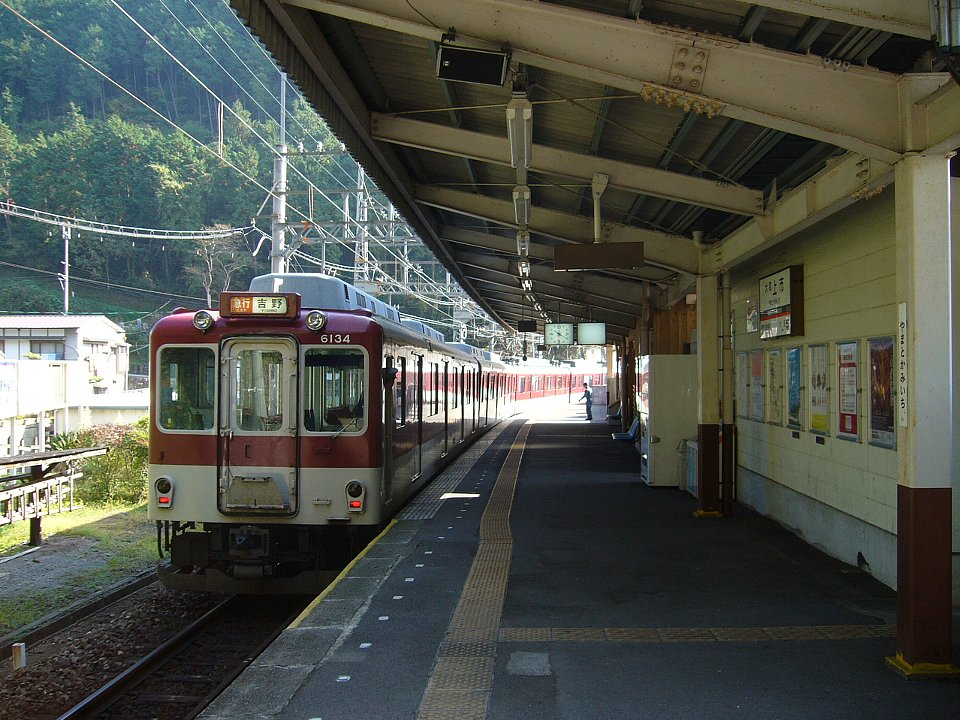
Platform

== History ==
Yamato-Kamiichi Station was opened on March 25, 1928 on the Yoshino Railway. On August 1, 1928, the line merged with the Osaka Electric Tramway, which was merged with the Sangu Express Railway on March 15, 1941 to become the Kansai Express Railway. The Kansai Express Railway merged with the Nankai Railway to form Kintetsu on June 1, 1944.

== Passenger statistics ==
In fiscal 2019, the station was used by an average of 266 passengers daily (boarding passengers only).

== Surrounding area ==
- Yoshino Town Hall
- National Route 169
- National Route 370

== See also ==
- List of railway stations in Japan
