= Shimoichiguchi Station =

Railway station in Ōyodo, Nara Prefecture, Japan

Shimoichiguchi Station 下市口駅
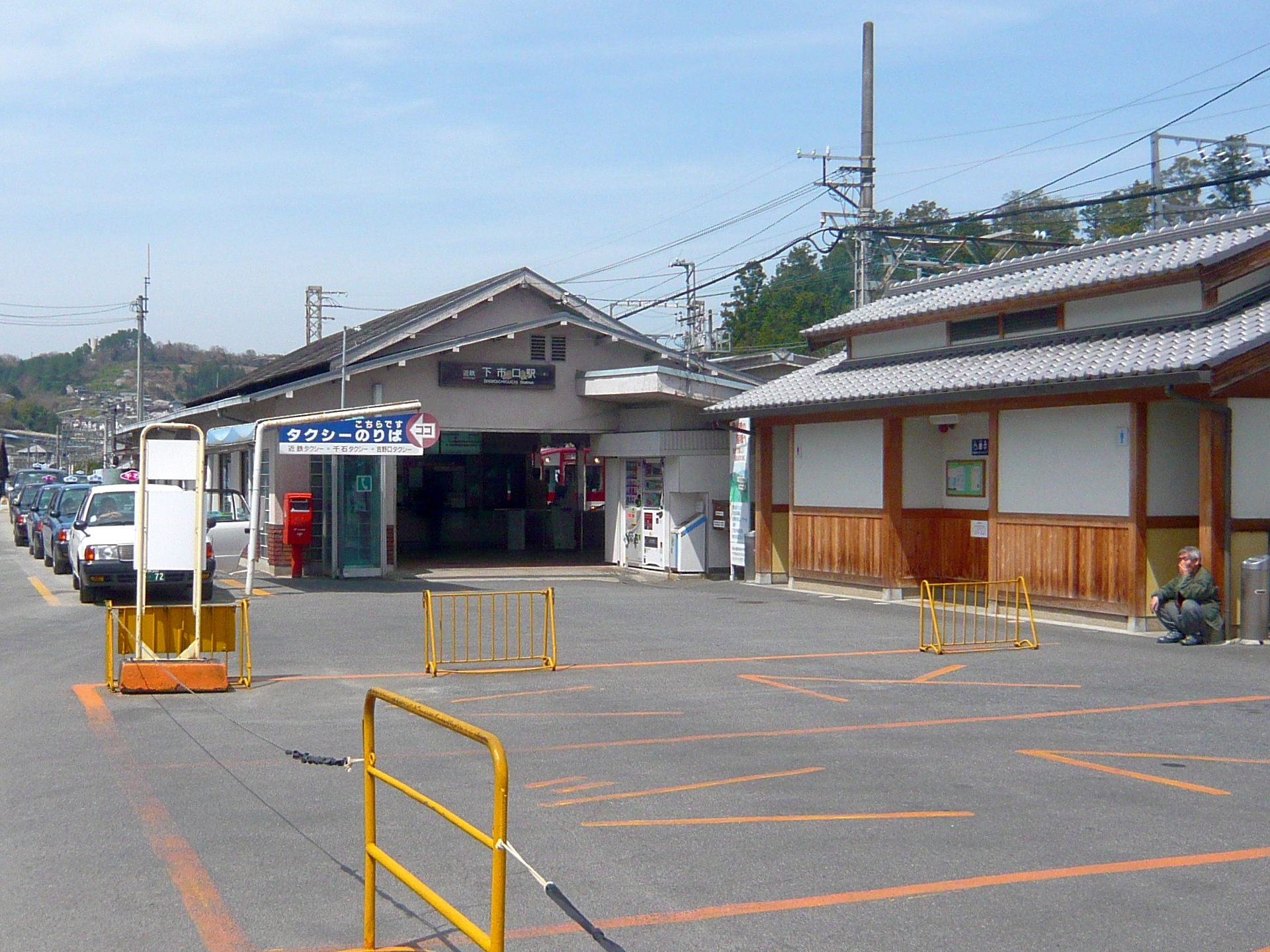
- Shimoichiguchi Station

General information
- Location: 875 Shimobuchi, Ōyodo-cho, Yoshino-gun, Nara-ken 638-0821; Japan
- Coordinates: 34°23′01″N 135°47′14″E
- System: Kintetsu Railway commuter rail station
- Owner: Kintetsu Railway
- Operator: Kintetsu Railway
- Line: F Yoshino Line
- Distance: 17.0 km (10.6 miles)
- Platforms: 1 side + 1 island platform
- Tracks: 3
- Train operators: Kintetsu Railway
- Bus stands: 1
- Connections: Nara Kotsu Bus Lines: 2・7・8・22・51・52; Oyodo Town Community Bus: Yodori Bus Trunk Route・Circular Route

Construction
- Structure type: At grade
- Parking: None
- Cycle facilities: Available
- Accessible: Yes (2 accessible slopes for each platform and equipped wheelchairs)

Other information
- Station code: F52
- Website: www.kintetsu.co.jp/station/station_info/en_station08015.html

History
- Opened: 25 October 1912

Passengers
- 2019: 1505
Services
Preceding station	Kintetsu Railway	Following station
F Yoshino Line
Ōada towards Ōsaka-Abenobashi, Furuichi or Kashiharajingū-mae	Local	Koshibe towards Yoshino or Muda
Ōada towards Ōsaka-Abenobashi	Semi-express	Koshibe towards Yoshino
Ōada towards Ōsaka-Abenobashi	Express	Koshibe towards Yoshino
Fukugami towards Ōsaka-Abenobashi	Limited Express	Muda towards Yoshino
Fukugami towards Ōsaka-Abenobashi	Sakura Liner	Muda towards Yoshino
Location
- Location within Nara Prefecture Location within Japan

Shimoichiguchi Station (下市口駅, Shimoichiguchi-eki) is a passenger railway station located in the town of Ōyodo, Yoshino District, Nara Prefecture, Japan. It is operated by the private transportation company, Kintetsu Railway.

== Line ==
Shimoichiguchi Station is served by the Yoshino Line and is 17.0 kilometers from the starting point of the line at Kashiharajingū-mae and 56.7 kilometers from Ōsaka Abenobashi.

== Layout ==
The station ground-level station with one side platform and one island platform. The effective length of the platform is long enough for four cars. The station building is on the south side (single platform 3 for upbound trains), and is connected to the island platforms for downbound trains (platforms 1 and 2) by a level crossing.

=== Platforms ===
1, 2	■ F Yoshino Line	for Yoshino
3	■ F Yoshino Line	for Ōsaka Abenobashi

== History ==
The station opened on 25 October 1912 when the Yoshino Light Railway. The Yoshino Railway merged with the Osaka Electric Tramway on 1 August 1929, which in turn merged with the Sangu Express Railway on 15 March 1941 to form the Kansai Express Railway. The Kansai Express Rail merged with Nankai Railway on 1 June 1944 to form the Kintetsu Railway Yoshino Line

== Passenger statistics ==
In fiscal 2019, the station was used by an average of 1505 passengers daily (boarding passengers only).

== Surrounding area ==
- Shimobuchi Shopping Street

== See also ==
- List of railway stations in Japan
