= Muda Station =

Railway station in Ōyodo, Nara Prefecture, Japan

Muda Station 六田駅
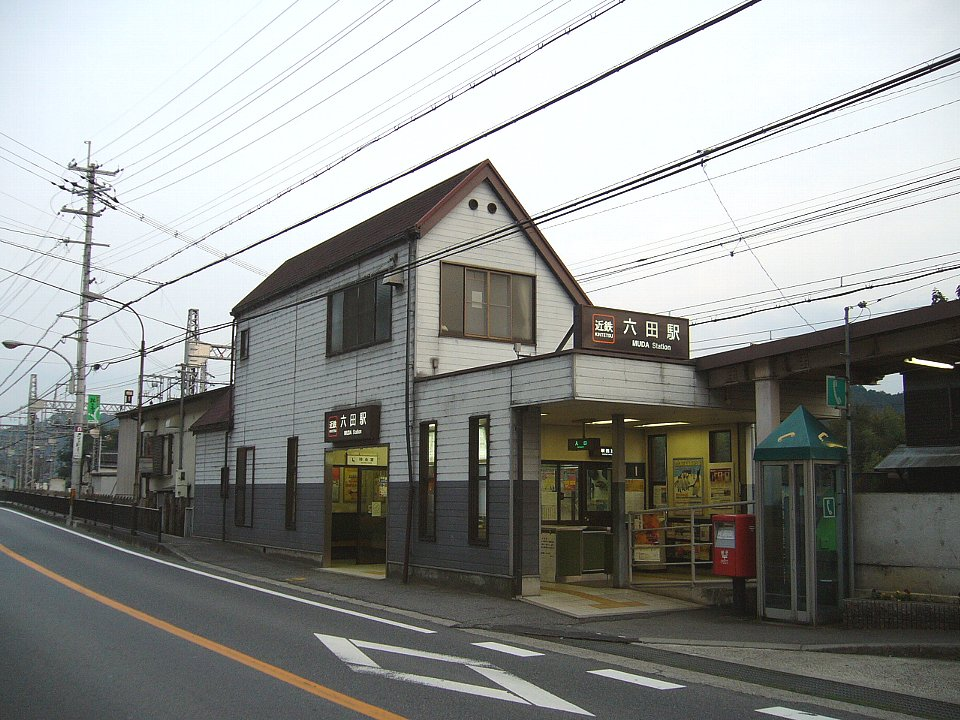
- Muda Station

General information
- Location: Kitamuda, Oyodo-cho, Yoshino-gun, Nara-ken 639-3124; Japan
- Coordinates: 34°23′25″N 135°49′23″E
- System: Kintetsu Railway commuter rail station
- Owner: Kintetsu Railway
- Operator: Kintetsu Railway
- Line: F Yoshino Line
- Distance: 20.7 km (12.9 miles)
- Platforms: 2 side platforms
- Tracks: 2
- Train operators: Kintetsu Railway
- Bus stands: 1
- Connections: Nara Kotsu Bus Lines: R169 Yūyū Bus (Southern Regional Cooperation Community Bus); Oyodo Town Community Bus: Yodori Bus Trunk Route

Construction
- Structure type: At grade
- Parking: None
- Cycle facilities: Available
- Accessible: Yes (1 accessible slope for each platform)

Other information
- Station code: F54
- Website: www.kintetsu.co.jp/station/station_info/en_station08017.html

History
- Opened: 25 October 1912
- Former names: Yoshino (1912—1928)

Passengers
- 2019: 453
Services
Preceding station	Kintetsu Railway	Following station
F Yoshino Line
Koshibe towards Ōsaka-Abenobashi, Furuichi or Kashiharajingū-mae	Local	Yamato-Kamiichi towards Yoshino
Koshibe towards Ōsaka-Abenobashi, Furuichi or Kashiharajingū-mae	Local	Terminus
Terminus	Local	Yamato-Kamiichi towards Yoshino
Koshibe towards Ōsaka-Abenobashi	Semi-express	Yamato-Kamiichi towards Yoshino
Koshibe towards Ōsaka-Abenobashi	Express	Yamato-Kamiichi towards Yoshino
Shimoichiguchi towards Ōsaka-Abenobashi	Limited Express	Yamato-Kamiichi towards Yoshino
Shimoichiguchi towards Ōsaka-Abenobashi	Sakura Liner	Yamato-Kamiichi towards Yoshino
Location
- Location within Nara Prefecture Location within Japan

Muda Station (六田駅, Muda-eki) is a passenger railway station located in the town of Ōyodo, Yoshino District, Nara Prefecture, Japan. It is operated by the private transportation company, Kintetsu Railway.

== Line ==
Muda Station is served by the Yoshino Line and is 20.7 kilometers from the starting point of the line at Kashiharajingū-mae and 60.4 kilometers from Ōsaka Abenobashi.

== Layout ==
The station ground-level station with two opposing side platforms and two tracks. The effective length of the platform is long enough for four cars. The station building is on the Yoshino side of the outbound platform, and is connected to the inbound platform by a level crossing. The station premises include the Muda Train Depot. The old Yoshino Station was located to the east of the current station building, towards the current on-site depot. The remains of the platform can still be seen at the back of the depot.

=== Platforms ===
1	■ F Yoshino Line	for Yoshino
2	■ F Yoshino Line	for Ōsaka Abenobashi

== History ==
The station opened as Yoshino Station (吉野駅) on 25 October 1912 when the Yoshino Light Railway opened between Yoshinoguchi and this station. The station was renamed to its present name on 25 March 1928. The Yoshino Railway merged with the Osaka Electric Tramway on 1 August 1929, which in turn merged with the Sangu Express Railway on 15 March 1941 to form the Kansai Express Railway. The Kansai Express Rail merged with Nankai Railway on 1 June 1944 to form the Kintetsu Railway Yoshino Line

== Passenger statistics ==
In fiscal 2019, the station was used by an average of 453 passengers daily (boarding passengers only).

== Surrounding area ==
- Seson-ji
- Japan National Route 169

== See also ==
- List of railway stations in Japan
