= List of historic sites of Japan (Osaka) =

This list is of the historic sites of Japan located within the Urban Prefecture of Ōsaka.

== National Historic Sites ==
As of 17 June 2022, seventy-one Sites have been designated as being of national significance (including two *Special Historic Sites); the Tombs of Chikamatsu Monzaemon cross the prefectural borders with Hyōgo.

Site	Municipality	Comments	Image	Coordinates	Type	Ref.
*Ōsaka Castle Site 大坂城跡; Ōsaka-jō ato	Ōsaka	Sengoku period castle remains		34°41′11″N 135°31′33″E	2	
*Kudara-dera ruins 百済寺跡; Kudaradera ato	Hirakata	Nara period temple ruins		34°48′56″N 135°39′40″E	3	
Akasaka Castle ruins 赤阪城跡; Akasaka-jō ato	Chihayaakasaka	Nanboku-chō period castle ruins		34°27′34″N 135°37′11″E	2	
Abuyama Kofun 阿武山古墳; Abuyama kofun	Takatsuki, Ibaraki	Kofun period tumulus		34°51′48″N 135°34′11″E	1	
Ama Site 安満遺跡; Ama iseki	Takatsuki	Yayoi period settlement trace		34°51′24″N 135°37′53″E	1	
Ikegami-Sone Site 池上曽根遺跡; Ikegami-Sone iseki	Izumi, Izumiōtsu	Yayoi period settlement trace		34°30′10″N 135°25′40″E	1	
Ishinohōden Kofun 石宝殿古墳; Ishinohōden kofun	Neyagawa	Kofun period tumulus		34°45′08″N 135°39′31″E	1	
Izumi Koganezuka Kofun 和泉黄金塚古墳; Izumikoganezuka kofun	Izumi	Kofun period tumulus		34°30′49″N 135°26′00″E	1	
Ichisuka Kofun Cluster 一須賀古墳群; Ichisuka kofun-gun	Taishi, Kanan	Kofun period tumuli cluster		34°30′19″N 135°38′35″E	1	
Imashirozuka Kofun - Shinchi Haniwa Production Site 今城塚古墳附新池埴輪製作遺跡; Imashirozuka kofun tsuketari Shinchi haniwa seisaku iseki	Takatsuki	Kofun period tumulus and haniwa workshop		34°51′14″N 135°34′52″E	1	
Iwaya 岩屋; Iwaya	Taishi	two Nara-period cave temples		34°31′13″N 135°40′35″E	3	
Eboshigata Castle ruins 烏帽子形城跡; Eboshigata-jō ato	Kawachinagano	Nanboku-chō period castle ruins		34°26′40″N 135°33′53″E	2	
Ogata Kōan Former Residence and Tekijuku School 緒方洪庵旧宅および塾; Ogata Kōan kyū-taku oyobi juku	Ōsaka	late Edo Period scholar and academy		34°41′28″N 135°30′12″E	4, 8	
Kaie-ji temple ruins 海会寺跡; Kaieji ato	Sennan	Asuka period temple ruins		34°22′34″N 135°17′21″E	3	
Kasuga Taisha Nangō Mokudai Imanishi Family Residence 春日大社南郷目代今西氏屋敷; Kasuga Taisha Nangō mokudai Imanishi-shi yashiki	Toyonaka	Edo period residence		34°45′42″N 135°28′53″E	2	
Katsuō-ji precincts 勝尾寺旧境内■（ボウ）示八天石蔵および町石; Katsuōji kyū-keidai bō ji hatten sekizō oyobi chōseki	Minoh	Nara period temple, one of the Saigoku Kannon Pilgrimage		34°51′26″N 135°29′41″E	3	
Kanayama Kofun 金山古墳; Kanayama kofun	Kanan	Kofun period tumulus		34°28′10″N 135°37′49″E	1	
Kawachidera temple ruins 河内寺廃寺跡; Kawachidera Haiji ato	Higashiōsaka	Nara period temple ruins		34°39′52″N 135°38′43″E	3	
Kanshin-ji precincts 観心寺境内; Kanshinji keidai	Kawachinagano	the NT kondō dates to the Shōhei era (1346–1369) (see List of National Treasures of Japan (Temples))		34°26′13″N 135°35′54″E	3	
Kannonzuka Kofun 観音塚古墳; Kannonzuka kofun	Habikino	Kofun period tumulus		34°32′15″N 135°38′29″E	1	
Kishibe Tile Kiln Site 吉志部瓦窯跡; Kishibe kawara kama ato	Suita	Heian period kiln ruins		34°47′01″N 135°31′51″E	6	
Old Sakai Lighthouse 旧堺燈台 kyū-Sakai tōdai	Sakai	Bakumatsu-Edo period lighouse		34°35′00″N 135°27′32″E	6	
Former Osaka Mint 旧造幣寮 kyū-zōheiryō	Ōsaka	Meiji period structure		34°41′54″N 135°31′17″E	6	
Kinyakurumazuka Kofun 禁野車塚古墳; Kinyakurumazuka kofun	Hirakata	Kofun period tumulus		34°48′39″N 135°39′25″E	1	
Kusaka Shell Mound 日下貝塚; Kusaka kaizuka	Higashiōsaka	Jomon period shell midden		34°41′32″N 135°38′55″E	1	
Kusunoki Castle (Kami-Akasaka Castle) ruins 楠木城跡 (上赤阪城跡); Kusunoki-jō ato (Kami-Akasaka-jō ato)	Chihayaakasaka	Nanboku-chō period castle ruins		34°26′56″N 135°37′52″E	2	
Kuzuha Battery Site 楠葉台場跡; Kuzuha daiba ato	Hirakata	Bakumatsu period fortification		34°52′35″N 135°40′53″E	2	
Kurohimeyama Kofun 黒姫山古墳; Kurohimeyama kofun	Sakai	Kofun period tumulus		34°32′45″N 135°33′28″E	1	
Keichū Hermitage and Grave 契沖旧庵 (円珠庵) ならびに墓; Keichū kyū-an (Enjuan) narabini haka	Ōsaka			34°40′20″N 135°31′28″E	3	
Kō Site 国府遺跡; Kō iseki	Fujiidera	Japanese Paleolithic period traces		34°34′33″N 135°37′14″E	1	
Kōnoike Shinden Kaisho 鴻池新田会所跡; Kōnoike shinden kaisho ato	Higashiōsaka	Edo period land reclamation site		34°41′53″N 135°35′59″E	6	
Kōriyama-shuku Honjin 郡山宿本陣; Kōriyama-shuku honjin	Ibaraki	post-station honjin (inn) on the old Saikoku Kaidō (西国街道)		34°50′08″N 135°32′41″E	6	
Kongō-ji Precinct 金剛寺境内; Kongōji keidai	Kawachinagano			34°25′43″N 135°31′46″E	3	
Honda Shiratori Haniwa Production Site 誉田白鳥埴輪製作遺跡; Honda Shiratori haniwa seisaku iseki	Habikino	Kofun period haniwa workshop		34°33′25″N 135°36′26″E	6	
Sairyō Kofun 西陵古墳, 第一、第二古墳; Sairyō kofun daiichi・daini kofun	Misaki	Kofun period tumulus		34°19′38″N 135°10′09″E	1	
Sakurai-no-eki Site 桜井駅跡 (楠正成伝説地); Sakurai-no-eki ato (Kusunoki Masashige densetsuchi)	Shimamoto	Site of post station on the Saikoku kaidō related in legend to Kusunoki Masashige		34°52′51″N 135°39′49″E	8	
Sakurazuka Kofun Cluster 桜塚古墳群; Sakurazuka kofun-gun	Toyonaka	Kofun period tumuli cluster; designation includes Ōishizuka Kofun (大石塚古墳), Koishizuka Kofun (小石塚古墳), Toyonaka Ōtsuka Kofun (大塚古墳), Oshishizuka Kofun (御獅子塚古墳), and Minami Tenpinzuka Kofun (南天平塚)		34°46′45″N 135°27′46″E	1	
Sayama pond 狭山池; Sayama-ike	Ōsakasayama	Kofun-Asuka period reservoir		34°30′13″N 135°33′20″E	6	
Shionjiyama Kofun 心合寺山古墳; Shionjiyama kofun	Yao	Kofun period tumulus		34°38′21″N 135°38′27″E	1	
Shitennō-ji precincts 四天王寺旧境内; Shitennōji kyū-keidai	Ōsaka			34°39′15″N 135°40′19″E	3	
Shima-no-kami District Office and Temple Site 嶋上郡衙跡附寺跡; Shima no kami gunga ato tsuketari tera ato	Takatsuki	Nara to Heian period government complex		34°51′07″N 135°36′10″E	2, 3	
Shindō temple ruins Site 新堂廃寺跡附オガンジ池瓦窯跡お亀石古墳; Shindō Haiji ato tsuketari Oganji-ike kawara kama ato Okameishi kofun	Tondabayashi	designation includes the Oganji-ike Tile Kiln Site and Okameishi Kofun		34°30′36″N 135°36′03″E	1, 3, 6	
Sumiyoshi Angū Site 住吉行宮跡; Sumiyoshi Angū ato	Ōsaka	Nanboku-cho period palace traces		34°36′31″N 135°29′38″E	2	
Takaida Cave Tombs 高井田横穴; Takaida yokoana	Kashiwara	Kofun period necropolis		34°34′19″N 135°38′21″E	1	
Takamiya temple ruins 高宮廃寺跡; Takamiya Haiji ato	Neyagawa	Asuka period temple ruins		34°45′21″N 135°38′19″E	3	
Takayasu Senzuka Kofun Cluster 高安千塚古墳群; Takayasu Senzuka Kofun-gun	Yao	Kofun period tumuli cluster		34°37′37″N 135°36′03″E	1	
Tanabe temple ruins 田辺廃寺跡; Tanabe Haiji ato	Kashiwara	Asuka to Nara period temple ruins		34°33′37″N 135°38′33″E	3	
Chihaya Castle ruins 千早城跡; Chihaya-jō ato	Chihayaakasaka	Nanboku-chō period castle ruins		34°24′56″N 135°39′13″E	2	
Tsūhō-ji ruins 通法寺跡; Tsūhōji ato	Habikino	late Heian period temple ruins		34°31′36″N 135°37′39″E	3	
Tsugeyama Kofun 闘鶏山古墳; Tsugeyama kofun	Takatsuki	Kofun period tumulus		34°51′14″N 135°35′06″E	1	
Tezukayama Kofun 帝塚山古墳; Tezukayama kofun	Ōsaka	Kofun period tumulus		34°37′17″N 135°29′48″E	1	
Tosaka-dera ruins 鳥坂寺跡; Tosakadera ato	Kashiwara	Asuka period temple ruins		34°35′01″N 135°37′57″E	3	
11 Tosa Warriors' Graves 土佐十一烈士墓; Tosa jūichi resshi no haka	Sakai	forced to commit seppuku in the Sakai incident of 1868; subject of the short story Sakai jiken (堺事件) by Mori Ōgai		34°34′53″N 135°28′54″E	7	
Dotō 土塔; Dotō	Sakai	Nara period pyramid		34°31′56″N 135°30′34″E	3	
Nanao Tile Kiln Site 七尾瓦窯跡; Nanao kawara kama ato	Suita	Nara period kiln ruins		34°31′12″N 135°30′59″E	6	
Naniwa Palace ruins 難波宮跡附法円坂遺跡; Naniwa-no-miya ato tsuketari Hōenzaka iseki	Ōsaka	designation includes the Hōenzaka Site		34°40′48″N 135°31′22″E	2	
Hine-no-shō sites 日根荘遺跡; Hine-no-shō iseki	Izumisano	14 sites connected with a Kamakura to Muromachi period landed estate, including the temple of Jigen-in (慈眼院)		34°22′25″N 135°20′38″E	6	
Futagozuka Kofun 二子塚古墳; Futagozuka kofun	Taishi	Kofun period tumulus		34°30′39″N 135°39′05″E	1	
Furuichi Kofun Cluster 古市古墳群; Furuichi kofungun	Fujiidera, Habikino	Kofun period tumuli cluster; designation comprises twenty components: Komuroyama Kofun (古室山古墳), Sekimenyama Kofun (赤面山古墳), Ōtorizuka Kofun (大鳥塚古墳), Suketayama Kofun (助太山古墳), Nabezuka Kofun (鍋塚古墳), Shiroyama Kofun (城山古墳), Minegazuka Kofun (峯ヶ塚古墳), Hakayama Kofun (墓山古墳), Nonaka Kofun (野中古墳), Mausoleum of Emperor Ōjin (応神天皇陵古墳外濠外堤), Hachizuka Kofun (鉢塚古墳), Hazamiyama Kofun (はざみ山古墳), Aoyama Kofun (青山古墳), Banshoyama Kofun (蕃所山古墳), Inarizuka Kofun (稲荷塚古墳), Higashiyama Kofun (東山古墳), Warizuka Kofun (割塚古墳), Karatoyama Kofun (唐櫃山古墳), Matsukawazuka Kofun (松川塚古墳), and Jōgenjisan Kofun (浄元寺山古墳); inscribed alongside Mozu Kofun Cluster on the UNESCO World Heritage List		34°33′46″N 135°36′23″E	1	
Makino Kurumazuka Kofun 牧野車塚古墳; Makino Kurumazuka kofun	Hirakata	Kofun period tumulus		34°50′01″N 135°40′09″E	1	
Matsuokayama Kofun 松岳山古墳; Matsuokayama kofun	Kashiwara	Kofun period tumulus		34°34′11″N 135°38′44″E	1	
Mayuyama Kofun 摩湯山古墳; Mayuyama kofun	Kishiwada	Kofun period tumulus		34°27′45″N 135°27′25″E	1	
Maruyama Kofun 丸山古墳; Maruyama kofun	Kaizuka	Kofun period tumulus		34°25′43″N 135°21′19″E	1	
Mozu Kofun Cluster 百舌鳥古墳群; Mozu kofungun	Sakai	Kofun period tumuli cluster; designation comprises nineteen components: Itasuke Kofun (いたすけ古墳) (pictured), Nagatsuka Kofun (長塚古墳), Osamezuka Kofun (収塚古墳), Tsukamawari Kofun (塚廻古墳), Monjuzuka Kofun (文珠塚古墳), Maruhoyama Kofun (丸保山古墳), Chinooka Kofun (乳岡古墳), Gobyō Omotezuka Kofun (御廟表塚古墳), Donchayama Kofun (ドンチャ山古墳), Shōrakujiyama Kofun (正楽寺山古墳), Kagamizuka Kofun (鏡塚古墳), Zenemonyama Kofun (善右ヱ門山古墳), Zenizuka Kofun (銭塚古墳), Guwashōbō Kofun (グワショウ坊古墳), Hatazuka Kofun (旗塚古墳), Terayama-Minamiyama Kofun (寺山南山古墳), Shichi-Kannon Kofun (七観音古墳), Gobyōyama Kofun (御廟山古墳内濠) (inner moat), and Nisanzai Kofun (ニサンザイ古墳内濠) (inner moat); inscribed alongside Furuichi Kofun Cluster on the UNESCO World Heritage List		34°33′12″N 135°29′08″E	1	
Yachū-ji temple ruins 野中寺旧伽藍跡; Yachūji kyū-garan ato	Habikino	Asuka period temple ruins		34°33′31″N 135°35′32″E	3	
Yuge-dera ruins 由義寺跡; Yugedera ato	Yao	Nara period temple ruins		34°37′37″N 135°36′03″E	3	
Yotsuike Site 四ツ池遺跡; Yotsuike iseki	Sakai	Yayoi period settlement trace		34°32′40″N 135°27′30″E	1	
Rokutan-ji ruins 鹿谷寺跡; Rokutanji ato	Taishi	early Heian period temple ruins		34°31′12″N 135°40′19″E	3	
Chikamatsu Monzaemon Grave 近松門左衛門墓; Chikamatsu Monzaemon no haka	Ōsaka	Edo Period playwright; another tomb can be found both at Myōhō-ji (妙法寺) in Chūō-ku, Ōsaka and at Kōsaiji (広済寺) in Amagasaki, Hyōgo Prefecture; the designation includes both sites		34°40′16″N 135°31′01″E	7	
Iimoriyama Castle ruins 飯盛城跡; Iimoriyama-jō ato	Daitō, Shijōnawate	Nanboku-chō period castle ruins		34°43′37″N 135°39′14″E	2	
Akutagawa Castle ruins 芥川城跡; Akutagawa-jō ato	Takatsuki			34°51′11″N 135°36′32″E	2	

== Prefectural Historic Sites ==
As of 15 March 2022, sixty-eight Sites have been designated as being of prefectural importance.

Site	Municipality	Comments	Image	Coordinates	Type	Ref.
Geppō-ji Site 月峯寺跡; Geppōji ato	Nose	on Mount Kenpi		34°58′32″N 135°24′26″E		for all refs see
Kayano Sanpei Former Residence 萱野三平旧邸; Kayano Sanpei kyū-tei	Minoh			34°49′40″N 135°29′03″E		
Hachizuka Kofun 鉢塚古墳; Hachizuka kofun	Ikeda			34°49′04″N 135°26′13″E		
Ikeda Chausuyama Kofun 池田茶臼山古墳; Ikeda Chausuyama kofun	Ikeda			34°49′34″N 135°26′03″E		
Kishibe Tile Kiln Site 吉志部瓦窯跡; Kishibe kawara kama ato	Suita			34°47′00″N 135°31′50″E		
Minohara Kofun 耳原古墳; Minohara kofun	Ibaraki			34°50′30″N 135°33′50″E		
Kaihōzuka Kofun 海北塚古墳; Kaihōzuka kofun	Ibaraki			34°50′29″N 135°32′59″E		
Shinkizan Kofun 紫金山古墳; Shinkizan kofun	Ibaraki			34°50′39″N 135°32′46″E		
Saikoku Kaidō Akutagawa Ichirizuka 西国街道芥川一里塚; Saikoku Kaidō Akutagawa ichirizuka	Takatsuki			34°51′07″N 135°36′47″E		
Emperor Keitai Kusuba Palace Site 継体天皇樟葉宮跡伝承地; Keitai tennō Kusuba-no-miya ato den-shōchi	Hirakata			34°52′04″N 135°41′23″E		
Wani Grave 伝王仁墓 den-Wani no haka	Hirakata			34°49′13″N 135°42′45″E		
Katano Higashikurumazuka Kofun 交野東車塚古墳; Katano Higashikurumazuka kofun	Katano			34°46′54″N 135°41′24″E		
Neya Kofun 寝屋古墳; Neya kofun	Neyagawa			34°45′43″N 135°39′19″E		
Kusunoki Masatsura Grave 伝楠木正行墓 den-Kusunoki Masatsura no haka	Shijōnawate			34°43′58″N 135°38′12″E		
Wada Kenshū Grave 伝和田賢秀墓 den-Wada Kenshū no haka	Shijōnawate			34°44′07″N 135°38′32″E		
Shinobugaoka Kofun 忍岡古墳; Shinobugaoka kofun	Shijōnawate			34°44′49″N 135°38′29″E		,
Settsu (Toyosaki) Prefectural Government Office Site 摂津県改称豊崎県庁跡; Settsu-ken kaishō Toyosaki-ken-chō ato	Ōsaka	in the grounds of Sōzen-ji (崇禅寺) in Higashiyodogawa-ku		34°44′02″N 135°30′31″E		
Chausuyama Kofun and Pond 茶臼山古墳および河底池; Chausuyama kofun oyobi kawazoko-ike	Ōsaka			34°39′06″N 135°30′44″E		
Settsu Kasanuhinomura Site 摂津笠縫邑跡; Settsu Kasanuhinomura ato	Ōsaka			34°40′11″N 135°33′38″E		
Keichū Myōhō-ji Precinct 僧契沖妙法寺境内 sō Keichū Myōhōji keidai	Ōsaka			34°40′08″N 135°32′54″E		
Okachiyama Kofun 御勝山古墳; Okachiyama kofun	Ōsaka			34°39′16″N 135°32′09″E		
Ōsaka Prefectural Government Office Site 大阪府庁跡; Ōsaka-fu-chō ato	Ōsaka			34°41′05″N 135°30′39″E		
Kayafuri No.1 Tumulus 萱振1号墳; Kayafuri 1-gō fun	Yao			34°38′34″N 135°36′14″E		
Togiyama Tumulus 伽山墳墓; Togiyama funbo	Taishi			34°30′58″N 135°37′58″E		
Fujiwara no Ietaka Grave 伝藤原家隆墓 den-Fujiwara no Ietaka no haka	Ōsaka			34°39′34″N 135°30′47″E		
Shōgonjōdo-ji Precinct 荘厳浄土寺; Shōgonjōdoji keidai	Ōsaka			34°36′45″N 135°29′57″E		
Nishinotsuji Site 西ノ辻遺跡; Nishinotsuji iseki	Higashiōsaka			34°36′45″N 135°29′57″E		
Kawachi Ōjō-in Site 河内往生院伝承地; Kawachi Ōjōin den-shōchi	Higashiōsaka			34°39′09″N 135°39′08″E		
Chōei-ji Precinct 長栄寺境内; Chōeiji keidai	Higashiōsaka			34°39′59″N 135°34′23″E		
Kagamizuka Kofun 鏡塚古墳; Kagamizuka kofun	Yao			34°38′24″N 135°38′15″E		
Onji Site 恩智遺跡; Onji iseki	Yao			34°36′25″N 135°37′37″E		
Kawachi Prefectural Government Office Site 河内県庁跡; Kawachi-ken-chō ato	Yao			34°37′44″N 135°35′48″E		
Atagozuka Kofun 愛宕塚古墳; Atagozuka kofun	Yao			34°38′10″N 135°38′52″E		
Chishiki-ji Kondō and East Pagoda Site 智識寺金堂跡および東塔跡; Chishikiji kondō ato oyobi tōtō ato	Kashiwara			34°34′56″N 135°37′59″E		
Seijōsen 清浄泉 (浄井戸); Seijōsen (jōido)	Kashiwara			34°34′57″N 135°38′03″E		
Anpukuji Cave Tomb Cluster 安福寺横穴群; Anpukuji ōketsu-gun	Kashiwara			34°33′47″N 135°37′46″E		
Tsuboi Hachiman-gū Precinct 壷井八幡宮境内; Tsuboi Hachiman-gū keidai	Habikino			34°31′51″N 135°37′33″E		
Eifuku-ji Precinct 叡福寺境内; Eifukuji keidai	Taishi			34°31′07″N 135°38′23″E		
Goryōyama Kofun 御嶺山古墳; Goryōyama kofun	Taishi			34°31′35″N 135°37′57″E		
Buddaji Kofun 仏陀寺古墳; Buddaji kofun	Taishi			34°30′53″N 135°38′59″E		
Hiraiwa Castle Site 平石城跡; Hiraiwa-jō ato	Kanan			34°29′57″N 135°38′40″E		
Hirokawa-dera Precinct 弘川寺境内; Hirokawadera keidai	Kanan			34°28′28″N 135°39′11″E		
Kōki-ji Precinct 高貴寺境内; Kōkiji keidai	Kanan			34°29′57″N 135°39′51″E		
Nigoritei 水郡邸; Nigoritei	Tondabayashi			34°29′39″N 135°35′38″E		
Higashi-Kōya Kaidō Nishikiori Ichirizuka 東高野街道錦織一里塚; Higashi-Kōya Kaidō Nishikiori ichirizuka	Tondabayashi			34°28′22″N 135°34′45″E		
Tsuzuyama Kofun - Nihonmatsu Kofun 廿山古墳及び二本松古墳; Tsuzuyama kofun oyobi Nihonmatsu kofun	Tondabayashi			34°29′17″N 135°34′47″E		
Ōe Tokichika Residence Site 伝大江時親邸跡 den-Ōe Tokichika tei ato	Kawachinagano			34°24′27″N 135°33′49″E		
Tōzuka Kofun 塔塚古墳; Tōzuka kofun	Sakai			34°32′20″N 135°27′17″E		
Kōzōji Kiln Sites 73 & 74 高蔵寺73号窯跡、74号窯跡; Kōzōji 73-gō yōseki, 74-gō yōseki	Sakai			34°30′04″N 135°29′59″E		
Gobōyama Kofun 御坊山古墳; Gobōyama kofun	Sakai			34°30′58″N 135°30′56″E		
Sakai Prefectural Government Office Site 堺県庁跡; Sakai-ken-chō ato	Sakai			34°35′00″N 135°28′55″E		
Keichū Yōju-an Site 契沖養寿庵跡; Keichū Yōju-an ato	Izumi			34°27′40″N 135°27′55″E		
Kitsunezuka Kofun 狐塚古墳; Kitsunezuka kofun	Izumi			34°29′11″N 135°26′46″E		
Matsuo-dera Precinct 松尾寺境内; Matsuodera keidai	Izumi			34°25′59″N 135°27′47″E		
Izumi Shimizu 和泉清水; Izumi shimizu	Izumi			34°29′14″N 135°25′40″E		
Marugasayama Kofun 丸笠山古墳; Marugasayama kofun	Izumi			34°29′45″N 135°26′40″E		
Kishiwada Castle Site 岸和田城跡; Kishiwada-jō ato	Kishiwada			34°27′32″N 135°22′15″E		
Kumeda-dera Precinct 久米田寺境内; Kumedadera keidai	Kishiwada			34°27′34″N 135°24′42″E		
Shiratoyama Kofun 白峠山古墳; Shiratoyama kofun	Misaki			34°19′38″N 135°10′57″E		
Kumano Kaidō Handa Ichirizuka 熊野街道半田一里塚; Kumano kaidō Handa ichirizuka	Kaizuka			34°26′04″N 135°21′34″E		
Umayado Ōji Site 廐戸王子跡; Umayado Ōji iseki	Sennan			34°22′35″N 135°17′19″E		
Tamadayama No.1 Tumulus 玉田山一号墳; Tamadayama ichi-gō fun	Hannan			34°20′43″N 135°15′19″E		
Tannowa-bessho Site 淡輪別所遺跡; Tannowa bessho iseki	Misaki			34°19′18″N 135°11′03″E		
Kōnosusan No. 1 Tumulus 鴻ノ巣山第1号墳; Kōnosusan daiichi-gō fun	Misaki			34°19′38″N 135°10′56″E		
Manda Embankment 伝茨田堤 den-Manda tsutsumi	Kadoma			34°44′42″N 135°36′15″E		
Tanpi Haiji Pagoda Site 丹比廃寺塔跡; Tanpi Haiji tō ato	Sakai			34°32′33″N 135°34′09″E		
Taguchiyama Site 田口山遺跡; Taguchiyama iseki	Hirakata			34°49′37″N 135°41′51″E		
Niwatorizuka Kofun 庭鳥塚古墳; Niwatorizuka kofun	Habikino			34°31′59″N 135°36′36″E		

== Municipal Historic Sites ==
As of 1 May 2021, a further ninety Sites have been designated as being of municipal importance, including:

Site	Municipality	Comments	Image	Coordinates	Type	Ref.
Sumiyoshi Taisha Precinct 住吉大社境内; Sumiyoshi Taisha keidai	Osaka			34°36′45″N 135°29′34″E		
Ihara Saikaku's Tomb 井原西鶴墓; Ihara Saikaku haka	Osaka	in the grounds of Seigan-ji (誓願寺)		34°40′12″N 135°31′10″E		
Kimura Kenkadō's Tomb 木村蒹葭堂墓; Kimura Kenkadō haka	Osaka	in the grounds of Daiō-ji (大応寺)		34°40′20″N 135°31′37″E		
Akatsuki Kanenaru's Tomb 暁鐘成墓; Akatsuki Kanenaru haka	Osaka	in the grounds of Shōraku-ji (勝楽寺)		34°42′10″N 135°28′57″E		
Taikō Gesui 中央部下水道改良事業の下水道敷 (通称「太閤下水」); Chūō-bu gesuidō kairyō jigyō no gesuidō jiki (tsūshō Taikō Gesui)	Osaka	drainage ditches overseen by Toyotomi Hideyoshi		34°40′48″N 135°30′52″E		
Ai No.1 Mound 安威1号墳; Ai ichi-gō-fun	Ibaraki			34°51′18″N 135°33′50″E		
Ai No.0 Mound 安威0号墳; Ai rei-gō-fun	Ibaraki			34°51′18″N 135°33′50″E		
Satsukigaoka Kofun 五月ケ丘古墳及び出土遺物; Satsukigaoka kofun oyobi shutsudo ibutsu	Ikeda	designation includes excavated artefacts		34°49′27″N 135°26′10″E		
Tanaka Tōkō's Tomb 田中桐江の墓; Tanaka Tōkō no haka	Ikeda	in the grounds of Taikō-ji (大広寺)		34°49′48″N 135°25′46″E		
Asada Domain Jin'ya Site 麻田藩陣屋跡; Asada-han jinya ato	Toyonaka			34°47′38″N 135°26′55″E		
Harada Castle Site 原田城跡; Harada-jō ato	Toyonaka			34°46′23″N 135°27′48″E		

== See also ==
- Cultural Properties of Japan
- Kawachi, Izumi, Settsu Provinces
- Osaka Museum of History
- List of Places of Scenic Beauty of Japan (Ōsaka)
- List of Cultural Properties of Japan - paintings (Ōsaka)
