= Nanao Tile Kiln Site =

Remains of Asuka period kilns in Suita, Osaka, Japan

Nanao tile kiln ruins
- 七尾瓦窯跡 (Japanese)
- Nanao tile kiln ruins Nanao Tile Kiln Site (Japan)
- Interactive map of Nanao tile kiln ruins
- 34°47′06.26″N 135°32′03.07″E
- Periods: Asuka period
- Location: Suita, Osaka, Japan
- Region: Kansai region

Site notes
- Public access: Yes

Nanao tile kiln ruins (七尾瓦窯跡, Nanao Kawara-gama ato) is an archaeological site consisting of the remains of Asuka period kilns located in what is now the Kishibe-kita neighborhood of the city of Suita, Osaka Prefecture in the Kansai region of Japan. It has been protected by the central government as a National Historic Site since 1980.

== Overview ==
The Nanao kiln ruins are located on the northwest slope of Shikinzan hills, which extends from the Senri Hills to the right bank of the Yodo River. Nearby was the Shakagaike branch of the Senri kilns, where Sue ware was fired during the Kofun period, and 300 meters to the east is the Kishibe Shrine, which is the site of the Heian period Kishibe Tile Kiln Site, which has a separate National Historic Site designation. The slope of the hill has an ash layer containing tile fragments, and it was recognized from around 1964 that this was the location of an ancient kiln: however, archaeological excavations did not occur until 1979, when there was a plan to develop residential land in this area. A large amount of roof tiles have been excavated from the kiln site. The soil and techniques of these tiles match those of the tiles used in the Naniwa Palace, which Emperor Shōmu started constructing in 726 AD.

The 1979 excavation confirmed the remains of seven kilns. There are six kilns on the northern slope of the hill that stretches from southwest to northeast, all of which are ascending kilns At the eastern end of the hill, 25 meters southeast of Kiln No. 1, was the remnants of a flat kiln in a poor state of preservation. Of the six ascending kilns, Kiln No.3 was the largest, at 5.4 meters in length and 1.75 meters in width, and both the firing section and the combustion section with seven steps in good preserved. Large sun-dried bricks were used for the side walls. The slope of the floor is gentler than that of No.2 kiln, averaging 17 degrees. The risers of the stairs are lined with large pillars, and the upper surface is covered with round and flat tiles. At this kiln site, unfired tiles were found in the state they were in when they were packed into the kiln. For some reason, it seems that the use was stopped without firing, and it is a rare case.

Kiln No. 2 had been partially leveled, but the total length of the existing part is 4.5 meters, and the width of the underground firing section is 2 meters. The slope of the floor surface is 40 degrees on average. The risers of the stairs are lined with large pillars, and the upper surface is covered with round tiles and half-cut flat tiles. Kiln No. 4 has a boat-shaped plan, with a total length of 6.3 meters, firing section maximum width of 2.2 meters. Kiln No.5 and Kiln No.6 had lengths of 5.5 meters and 5.8 meters respectively, and share the same vestibule. No. 1 kiln has not been investigated. The coexistence and simultaneous operation of different types of kilns is a characteristic of this site.

Follow on excavations were conducted in 1983, 1984-1985 and 1990. It is believed that there was a tile-making workshop on the north side of the kiln site, the location of which has yet to be discovered.

The site is about 20 minutes on foot from Kishibe Station on the JR West Tokaido Main Line.

== See also ==
- List of Historic Sites of Japan (Osaka)
