= Kawachidera temple ruins =

Asuka period Buddhist temple ruins

Kawachi-dera ruins
- 河内寺廃寺跡 (Japanese)
- Kawachi-dera ruins Kawachidera temple ruins (Japan)
- Interactive map of Kawachi-dera ruins
- 34°39′52″N 135°38′43″E
- Type: temple ruins
- Periods: Asuka period
- Location: Higashiōsaka, Osaka, Japan
- Region: Kansai region

Site notes
- Public access: Yes (park)

The Kawachi-dera ruins (河内寺廃寺跡, Kawachidera Haiji ato), is an archaeological site with the ruins of an Asuka period Buddhist temple located in the Kawachi neighborhood of the city of Higashiōsaka, Osaka, Japan. The temple no longer exists, but the temple grounds were designated as a National Historic Site in 2008 with the area under protection expanded in 2016.

== Overview ==
The Kawachi-dera ruins are located on gently sloping ground at an elevation of 20 meters at the western foot of the Ikoma Mountains in the eastern part of Higashiosaka. Immediately to the northwest of the ruins is the Taraike ruins, which is believed to be the Nara period administrative center for Kawachi County. Per archaeological excavations, the foundations for a mid-7th century temple complex with an arrangement of buildings on a south-to-north alignment patterned after Shitennō-ji in Osaka was discovered. The remains of the pagoda foundation, 10.7 meters square and 1.4 meters high was found to be in particularly good condition. Analysis of the excavated roof tiles confirm that the Kondo and cloister date from the middle of the 7th century, and the pagoda from a little later in the 7th century. The temple was abandoned around the end of the Kamakura period, based on a bowl dated to the beginning of the 14th century which was found in the sediment which covered the foundation stones. From historical documentation, is believed that this temple was constructed by an influential toraijin clan, the Kawachi-no-atai, who may have been the same as the "Oshikochi no Kuni no miyatsuko" who ruled ancient Kawachi Province. This area of Kawachi was known to have a large population of settlers from Baekje in late Kofun period into the Asuka period. The temple later became the official temple associated with the county-level administrative center with the developed of the ritsuryo system of local governments in the Nara period.

The site is preserved as an archaeological park, and is about a ten-minute walk from Hyotanyama Station on the Kintetsu Railway Kintetsu Nara Line.

== See also ==
- List of Historic Sites of Japan (Osaka)
