= Yotsuike Site =

Yotsuike site
- 四ツ池遺跡 (Japanese)
- Yotsuike site Yotsuike Site (Japan)
- Interactive map of Yotsuike site
- 34°31′56″N 135°30′31.9″E
- Type: settlement trace
- Periods: Yayoi period
- Location: Nishi-ku, Sakai, Osaka Prefecture, Japan
- Region: Kansai region

Site notes
- Public access: Yes (no facilities)

The Yotsuike site (四ツ池遺跡, Yotsuike iseki), is an archaeological site containing the remains of a Yayoi period settlement, located in the Otorikitamachi, Nishifunao-cho neighborhood of Nishi-ku, Sakai, Osaka Prefecture, Japan. It was designated a National Historic Site in 1989, with the area under protection enlarged in 2001.

== Overview ==
The Yotsuike site is located at the northern end of the Funao Plateau, a tongue-shaped ridge which protrudes north from the Izumi hills toward the Ishizu River, which flows into Osaka Bay in the southern part of the Osaka Plain. The site is surrounded by cliffs and natural rivers on three sides. The site has been known since the late 19th century as a location where stone tools could be found, and was introduced to academia in the early 20th century for discoveries of "octopus-shaped" pottery. However, a formal archaeological excavation was not made until the late 1940s with the construction of Hamadera Junior High School by the city of Sakai. Further excavations were conducted in the late 1960s and 1970s due to the construction of Japan National Route 26 highway.

The village remnants extended over an area of about 150 meters north-to-south by 100 meters east-to-west, and was protected by a V-shaped moat on the narrow portion of the ridge. The settlement contained at least 100 pit dwellings divided into three settlement areas, and two square girder tombs. Artifacts discovered during excavation included early Yayoi pottery, stone tools and some woodwork. The stone tools included the blades for hoes and plows, indicating the cultivation of rice, and stone arrowheads and fishhooks also point to a continuation of hunting. Dotaku for use in rituals have also been recovered near the site. Some of these items originated at locations in the Kawachi region or in the Kii Peninsula, indicating that trade existed in the Izumi region during this time. Artifacts from the late Jōmon period extending into the Heian period indicate many centuries of occupancy; however, the greatest concentration of artifacts was from the early to middle Yayoi period (3rd to 1st century BC)

The site was backfilled after excavation and is now part of a park, It is located about 20 minutes on foot from Ōtori Station on the JR West Hanwa Line. Many artifacts from this site are stored at the Doshisha University Historical Museum in Kyoto.

== See also ==
- List of Historic Sites of Japan (Osaka)
