= Ama Site =

Ama site
- 安満遺跡 (Japanese)
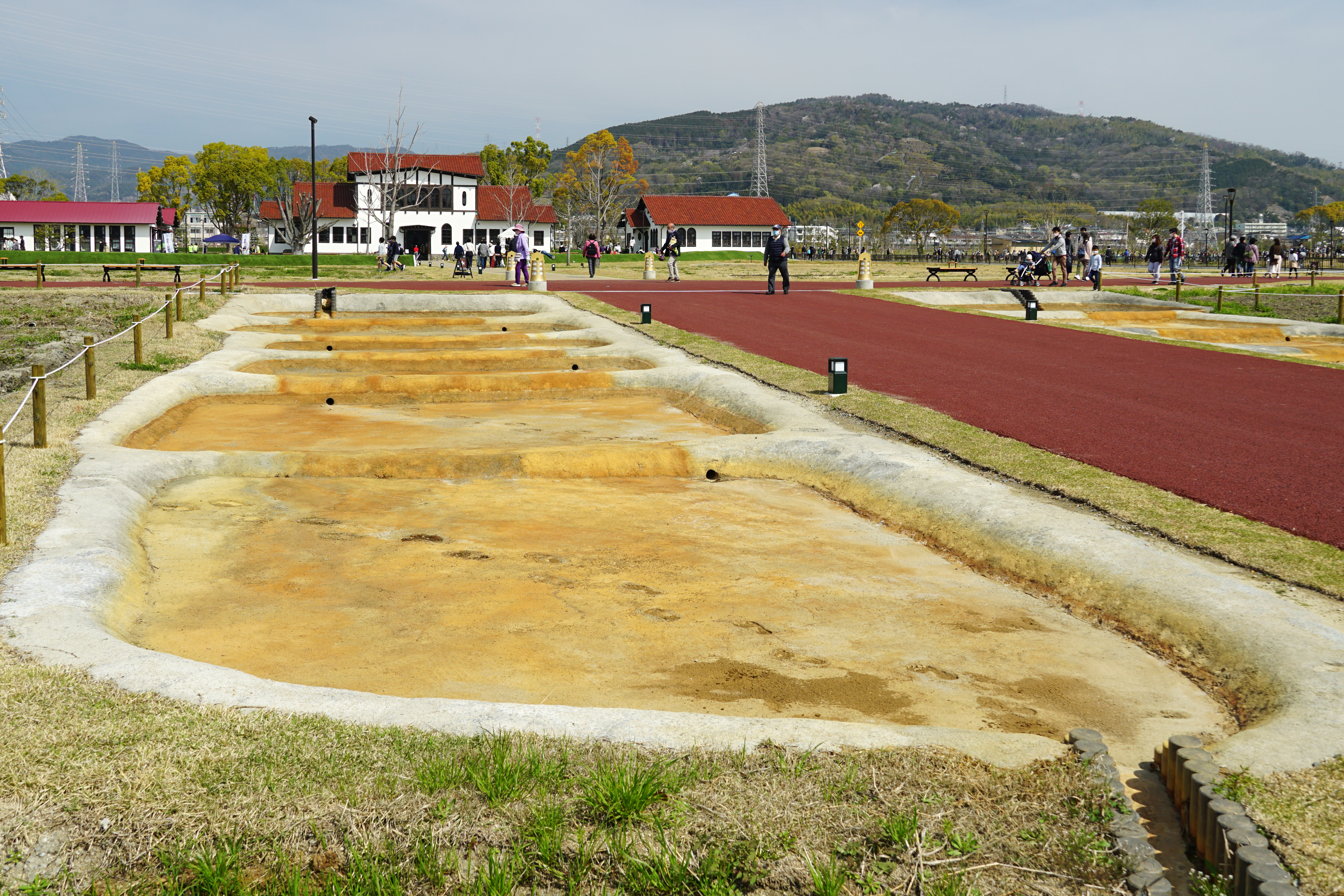
- Ama Site Park showing remnants of paddy fields

- Ama site Ama Site (Japan)
- 34°51′23.1″N 135°37′51.4″E
- Type: settlement
- Periods: Yayoi period
- Location: Takatsuki, Osaka, Japan
- Region: Kinai region

History
- Built: 2nd century BC to 2nd century AD

Site notes
- Elevation: 10 m (33 ft)
- Excavation dates: 1966
- Public access: Yes (park)
- National Historic Site of Japan

The Ama Site (安満遺跡, Ama iseki) is an archaeological site with a Yayoi period settlement, located in the Hatchowate neighborhood of the city of Takatsuki in the Kinai region of Japan. The site was designated a National Historic Site in 1993.

== Overview ==
The Aoyakamiji site is located at the eastern end of the Mishima Plain, on an alluvial fan formed by the Hino River, which flows through the eastern part of Takatsuki City. The site was discovered in 1928, during the construction of a farm attached to the Kyoto University Graduate School of Agriculture. The site drew academic attention as the earliest known location of Yayoi culture and rice cultivation in the Kinai region.

Furthermore, from around 1966, when housing development began, archaeological excavations were conducted on the north side of the farm, and it was found that the traces of settlements spread over a wide area. Since 1966, more than 50 excavations have been conducted. The settlement was eventually found to extend 1.5 kilometers from east-to-west and 600 meters from north-to-south, and consist of well defined land usage, with distinct areas devoted to groups of dwellings, a production area consisting of paddy fields and irrigation canals, and a cemetery area centered on rectangular circumferential graves.

A large amount of Yayoi pottery, stone tools, and wooden products have been excavated, covering a wide variety of items such as daily life tools, accessories, agricultural tools, looms, and ritual objects including many items which had been brought to this location from other regions. These artifacts indicate that the site had been occupied from the early to middle Yayoi period, and had evolved over three distinct phases. The earliest phase was a moated settlement located on a hill to the south of the central part of the ruins, measuring 150 by 140 meters. Paddy fields with irrigation canals were located to the south and the cemetery to the east.

The area was in a wetland, and often subject to flooding and was periodically abandoned. In the middle period, land usage remained the same, but the settlement considerably grew in size, with a second residential zone 200 meters to the north, with its own paddy fields, and a new cemetery to the west. In the last period, the settlement shrunk in size with the northern residential area disappearing, and the original settlement shifting to the location of the eastern cemetery.

With the relocation of the farm attached to Kyoto University, Takatsuki City developed the area as the "Aman Ruins Park," both for preserving the site as well as providing space for disaster prevention functions. C Part of the west side of the park opened in March 2019. In March 2021, the entire park was opened. The site is about 15 minutes on foot from Takatsuki Station on the JR West Tokaido Main Line.

== See also ==
- List of Historic Sites of Japan (Ōsaka)
