= Shima-no-kami District Office and Temple Site =

Shima-no-kami Gunga site and associated temple ruin
- 嶋上郡衙跡附寺跡 (Japanese)
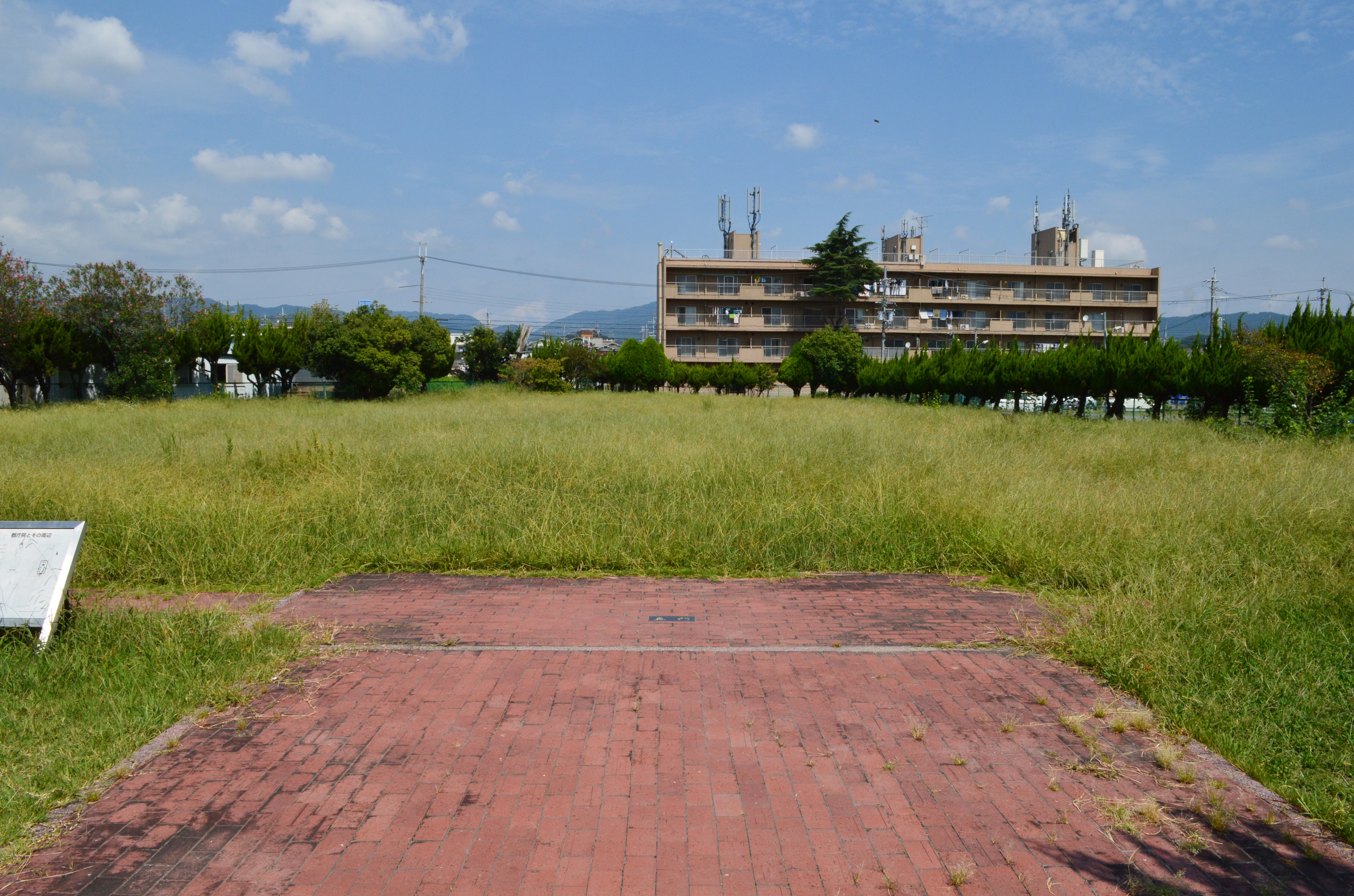

- Shima-no-kami Gunga site and associated temple ruin Shima-no-kami District Office and Temple Site (Japan)
- Interactive map of Shima-no-kami Gunga site and associated temple ruin
- 34°51′07″N 135°36′10″E
- Periods: Nara to Heian period
- Location: Takatsuki, Osaka, Japan
- Region: Kansai region

History
- Built: 7th to 10th century

Site notes
- Public access: No

The Shima-no-kami Gunga site and associated temple ruins (嶋上郡衙跡附寺跡, Shima no kami gunga ato tsuketari tera ato) is an archaeological site with the ruins of late Nara period to Heian period government administrative complex and official temple located in the Kawanishi-cho, Seifukuji-cho, and Gunge-shinmachi neighborhoods of the city of Takatsuki, Osaka Prefecture in the Kansai region of Japan. It was designated a National Historic Site of Japan in 1971.

== Overview ==
In the late Nara period, after the establishment of a centralized government under the Ritsuryō system and Taika Reforms, local rule over the provinces was standardized under a kokufu (provincial capital), and each province was divided into smaller administrative districts, known as (郡, gun, kōri), composed of 2–20 townships in 715 AD. Each of the units, or "gunga" (郡衙) had an administrative complex built on a semi-standardized layout based on contemporary Chinese design, with rectangular layout surrounded by a moat, earthen ramparts and wooden palisade. Within were the administrative buildings, typically in a "U" shape, and often within a secondary enclosure. Either within the primary enclosure, or else nearby was a group of warehouses arranged in regularly spaced rows, protected by its own palisade and moat. These warehouses were granaries used for storing rice or other produce, which was collected as taxation from the local inhabitants.

Shimanokami site is located on a slight elevation on the west bank of the middle reaches of the Akutagawa River, where a series of hills stretch out to the northwest. This site is the first gunga site to be confirmed in the Kinai region, and is valuable for considering the settlement structure and historical background before and after the establishment of the Ritsuryō system. In 1971, it was designated as a National Historic Site, along with the ruins of the Akutagawa Temple to the west, which is now the grounds of Susanoo-no-Mikoto Jinja. Archaeological excavations revealed the remains of a large group of post-hole foundation buildings from the Nara period, overlapping with the remains of the earlier Yayoi and Kofun periods. Several shards of Haji ware pottery with the ink inscription "Kamigori" were excavated from a well piled with tri-colored pottery fragments, wooden tablets, and river stones. The surrounding area is called Gunge, so it is believed that this was the very center of the ancient Shima-no-kami County Government.

The site is about a 20-minute walk from Takatsuki Station on the JR West Tokaido Main Line.

== See also ==
- List of Historic Sites of Japan (Osaka)
