= Tsugeyama Kofun =

- 闘鶏山古墳 (Japanese)
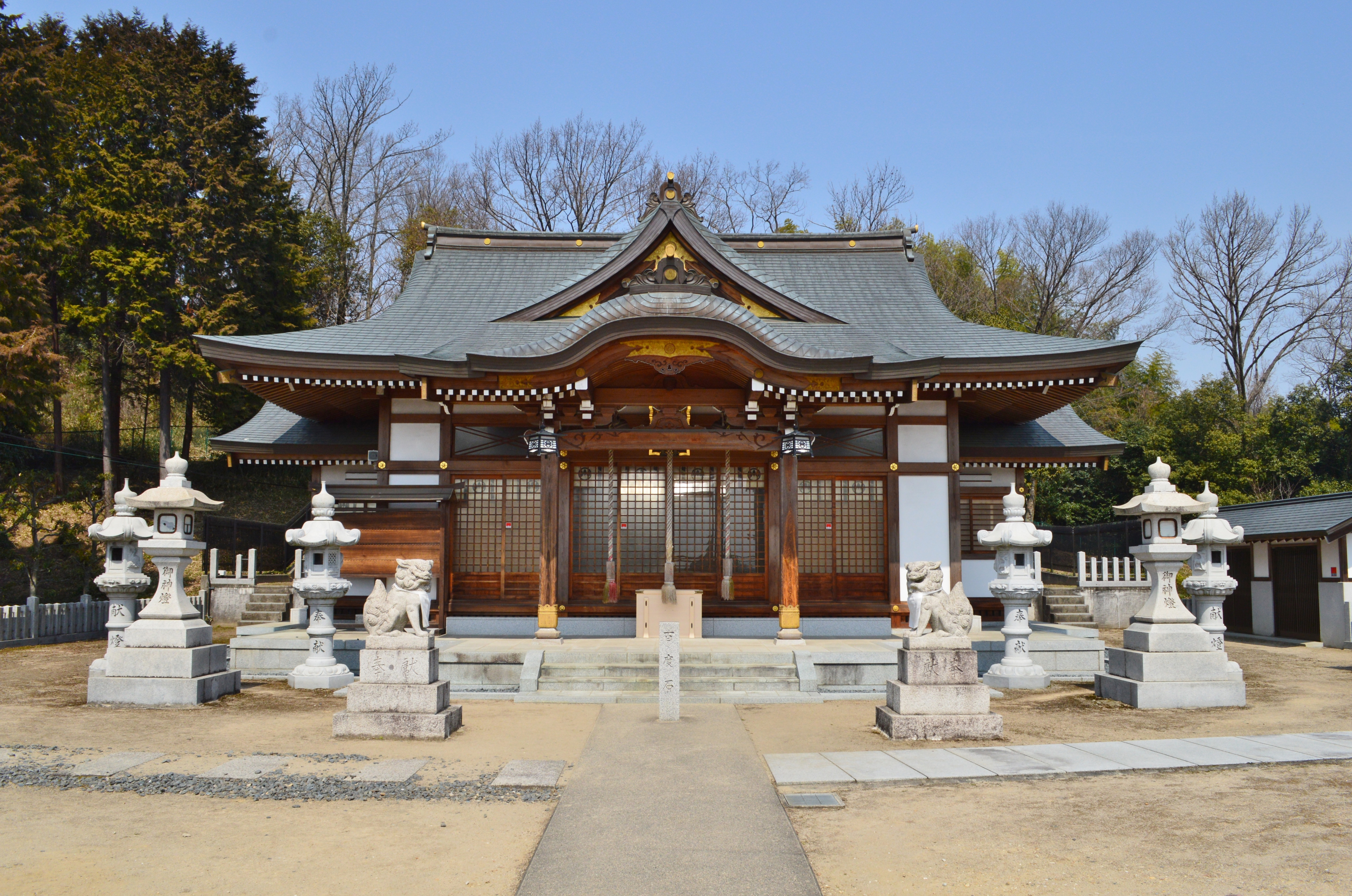
- The Tsugeyama Kofun is on the grounds of the Tsugeno Jinja

- Tsugeyama Kofun Tsugeyama Kofun (Japan)
- Interactive map of Tsugeyama Kofun
- 34°51′14″N 135°35′06″E
- Type: Kofun
- Periods: Kofun period
- Location: Takatsuki, Osaka, Japan
- Region: Kansai region

History
- Built: 4th century

Site notes
- Public access: Yes (no facilities)

Tsugeyama Kofun (闘鶏山古墳) is a Kofun period burial mound, located in the Himuro neighborhood of the city of Takatsuki, Osaka Prefecture, in the Kansai region of Japan. The tumulus was designated a National Historic Site of Japan in 2002. Its name comes from an underground ice storage room used for cockfighting, which is mentioned in the Nihon Shoki under the entry for the reign of Emperor Nintoku.

== Overview ==
The Tsugeyama Kofun is located at an elevation of 84 meters on the Nasawara Hills on the southern slope of the Hokusetsu Mountain Range. It belongs to the Mishima Kofun Cluster, which has about 500 burial mounds, including the Imashirozuka Kofun, which has a separate National Historic Site designation. It is a zenpō-kōen-fun (前方後円墳), which is shaped like a keyhole, having one square end and one circular end, when viewed from above and is orientated to the south. It has a total length of 86.4 meters, and the diameter of the posterior circular portion is 60 meters. The entire surface of the mound is covered with fukiishi up to the second terrace and the top of the posterior circular portion where the burial chamber is located, but no haniwa have been found. On the southeast side of the circular rear part, there is an extension where stones are laid in contact with the main body of the tumulus, and it is believed that rituals were performed there. In addition, many Haji ware fragments have been found in this area, and there is also a theory that Haji ware jars were lined up on the top the mound in lieu of haniwa.

Two pit-style stone burial chambers have been confirmed in the posterior circular portion. An investigation in 2002 revealed that both have not been looted and have remained intact since the construction of the tumulus. The first chamber is 14.5 meters by 10–11 meters parallel to the main axis of the tumulus, at a depth of roughly two meters. The top of the ceiling stone is covered with clay with a thickness of 10–15 cm. The stone walls are made by piling up many 20–30 cm x 40–70 cm, 4–6 cm thick plate-shaped stones. These stones and the ceiling stone are crystalline schist from the Yoshino River basin in Tokushima Prefecture. Looking into the burial chamber through an endoscope inserted into a gap between stones, the sarcophagus was determined to be "spay-bamboo" design wooden coffin, which is common in the early tumulus, and some of the coffin material seems to have remained undecayed. Vermilion was scattered around the deceased, and the skull was also confirmed to be stained with vermilion. With regards to burial goods, two triangular-rimmed divine beast bronze mirrors, a rectangular mirror, a jasper bracelet, shell and stone products, bronze arrowheads, and iron swords were confirmed. Also, one of the bronze mirrors was found to be the same type as was excavated from the Tsubaki Otsukayama Kofun in Kizugawa, Kyoto. Also, at the end of the chamber, many small iron tags that are thought to be part of a set of armor were found.

The second burial chamber is relatively shallow, about one meter from the top of the circular portion of the mound, and the stones used for the walls are the same crystalline schist as the first chamber. The coffin is also a split bamboo style wooden coffin, and more coffin material is left than the first body. An iron sword has been confirmed as a grave good. These relics and the style of the tumulus indicate that it was built in the first half of the 4th century, in the early Kofun period.

As the humidity in both chambers was found to be very high, the relics are wet. In addition, stones falling from the side walls have damaged some of the relics, so it was determined in 2010 that full-scale archaeological excavation was necessary for further preservation. The tumulus is ten minutes by car from JR West Tokaido Main Line Settsu-Tonda Station.

== See also ==
- List of Historic Sites of Japan (Osaka)
