= Maruyama Kofun (Kaizuka) =

Kofun period burial mound in Kaizuka, Japan

- 丸山古墳 (Japanese)
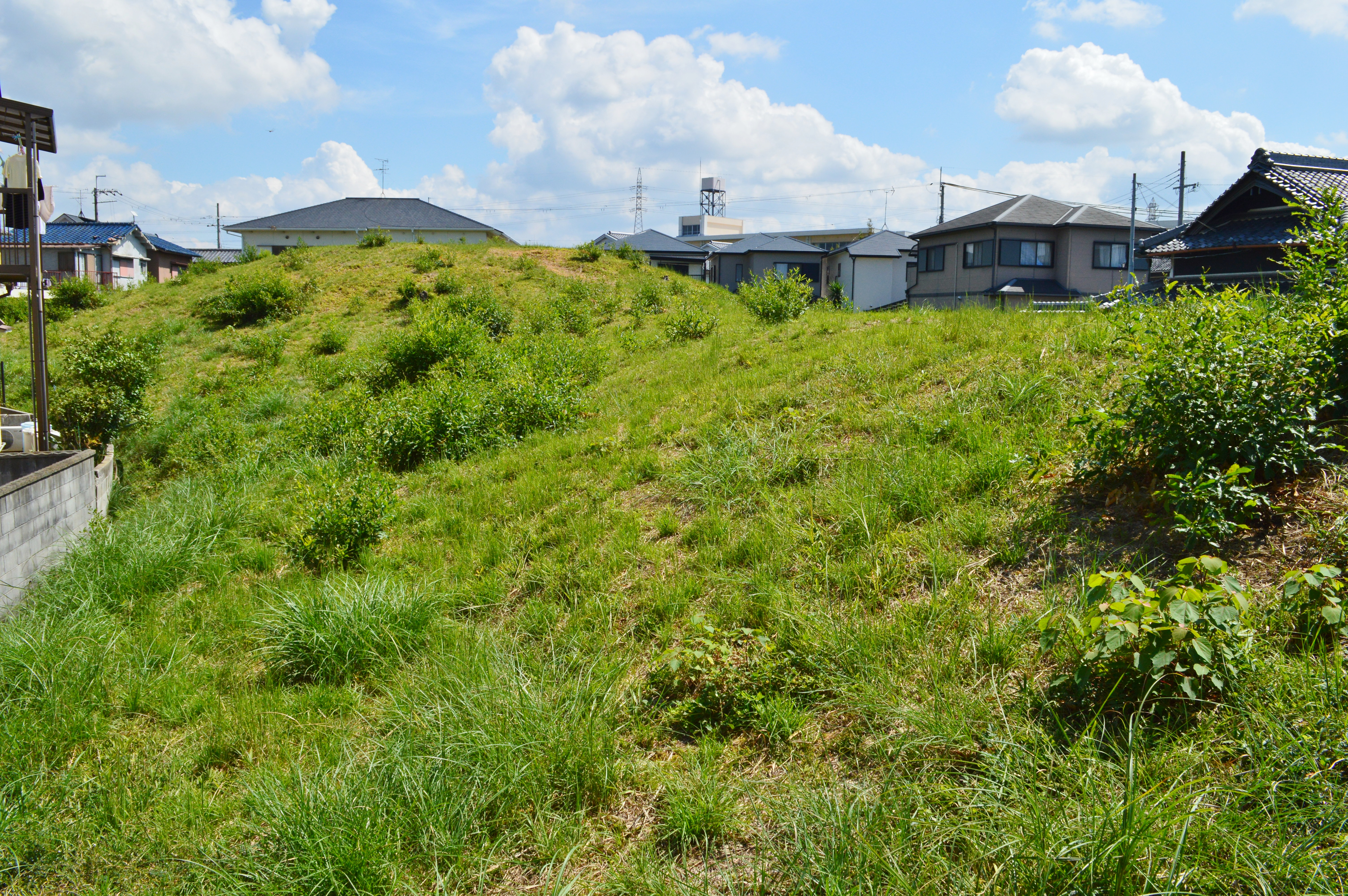
- Maruyama Kofun

- Maruyama Kofun Maruyama Kofun (Kaizuka) (Japan)
- Interactive map of Maruyama Kofun
- 34°25′42.95″N 135°21′19″E
- Type: Kofun
- Periods: Kofun period
- Location: Kaizuka, Osaka, Japan
- Region: Kansai region

History
- Built: c.4th century

Site notes
- Public access: Yes (no facilities)

Maruyama Kofun (丸山古墳) is a Kofun period keyhole-shaped burial mound, located in the Jizodō neighborhood of the city of Kaizuka, Osaka in the Kansai region of Japan. The tumulus was designated a National Historic Site of Japan in 1956. It is also called the Jizo-dō Maruyama Kofun (地蔵堂丸山古墳)

== Overview ==
The Maruyama Kofun is a zenpō-kōen-fun (前方後円墳), which is shaped like a keyhole, having one square end and one circular end, when viewed from above. It is located on a fluvial terrace of the Kogi River, and is orientated to the west. The tumulus has a total length of 73 meters with a 43-meter diameter posterior circular portion. The tumulus was originally covered in fukiishi and had a large number and variety of haniwa, including cylindrical, "morning glory-shaped", figurative and house-shaped styles. There was no trace of a moat around the tumulus, and the location and structure of the burial chamber was not clear. It is believed to have been built around the latter half of the 4th century. Six more smaller kofun (four circular-type (empun (円墳) and two square-type (hōfun (方墳)) have been found on the grounds of the nearby Kaizuka Minami Elementary School, forming a cluster of tumuli, suggesting that this was the burial ground for local tribal chieftains during the 4th and 5th centuries.

Toyotomi Hideyoshi is known to have established a temporary field headquarters on this tumulus in 1585, during his invasion of Kii Province]. The tumulus (which was then in private hands) was scheduled for demolition for use as landfill in 1952 before a rescue archaeology excavation in 1952 placed a stop. The owner donated the site to Kaizuka City in 1957, but a through archaeological excavation was not conducted until 2000 to 2002. In the meantime, the surroundings have been completely developed as a housing estate. The haniwa excavated from the site were designed a Kaizuka City Tangible Cultural Property in 2006.

The tumulus is about a ten-minute walk from Izumi-Hashimoto Station on the JR West Hanwa Line.

Total length
72 meters:
Anterior rectangular portion
27 meters wide x 4 meters high, 3-tier
West Constriction
23 x 13 meters
Posterior circular portion
43 meter diameter x 5 meters high, 3-tiers

== Gallery ==
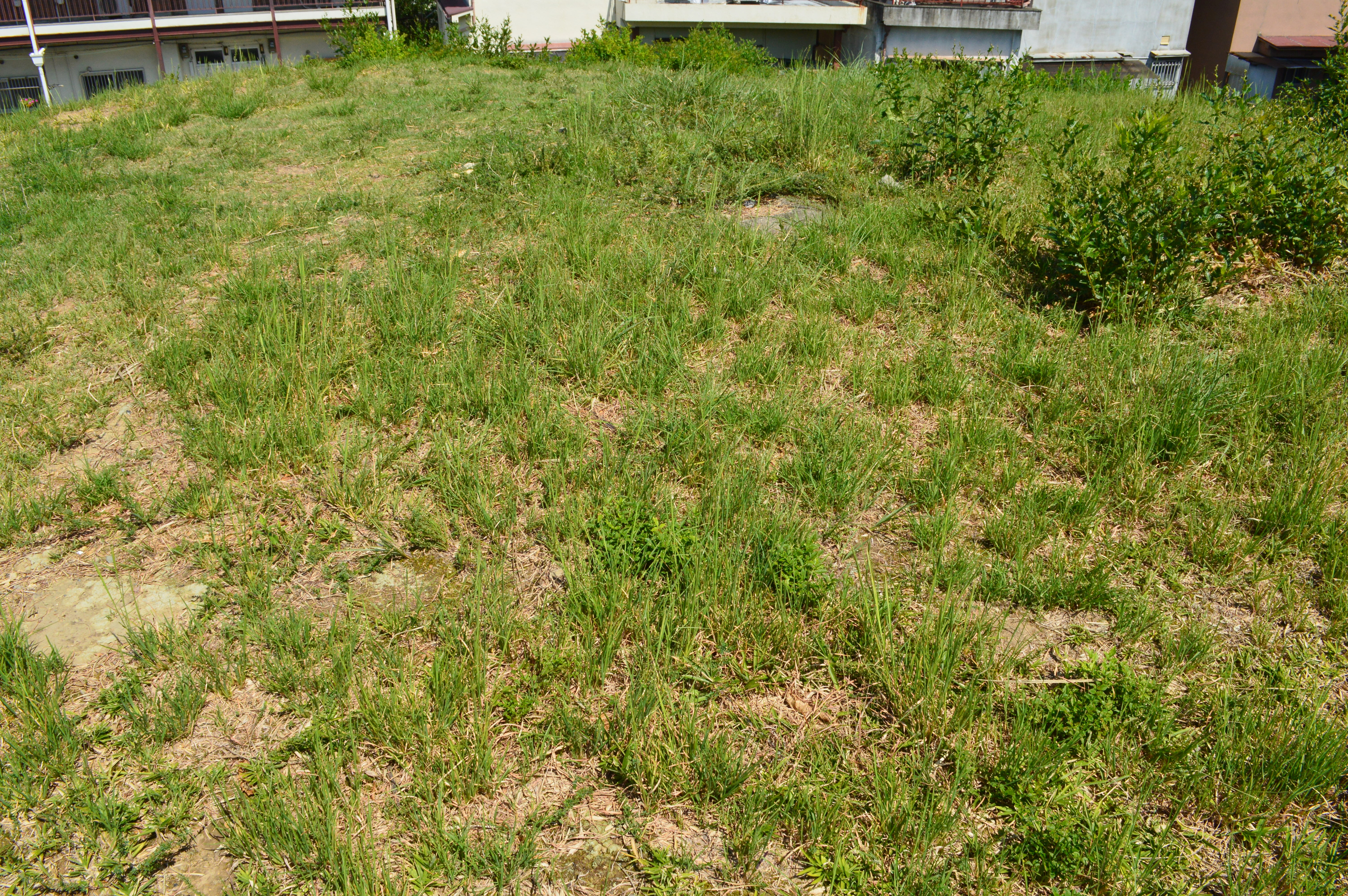
Panoramic view

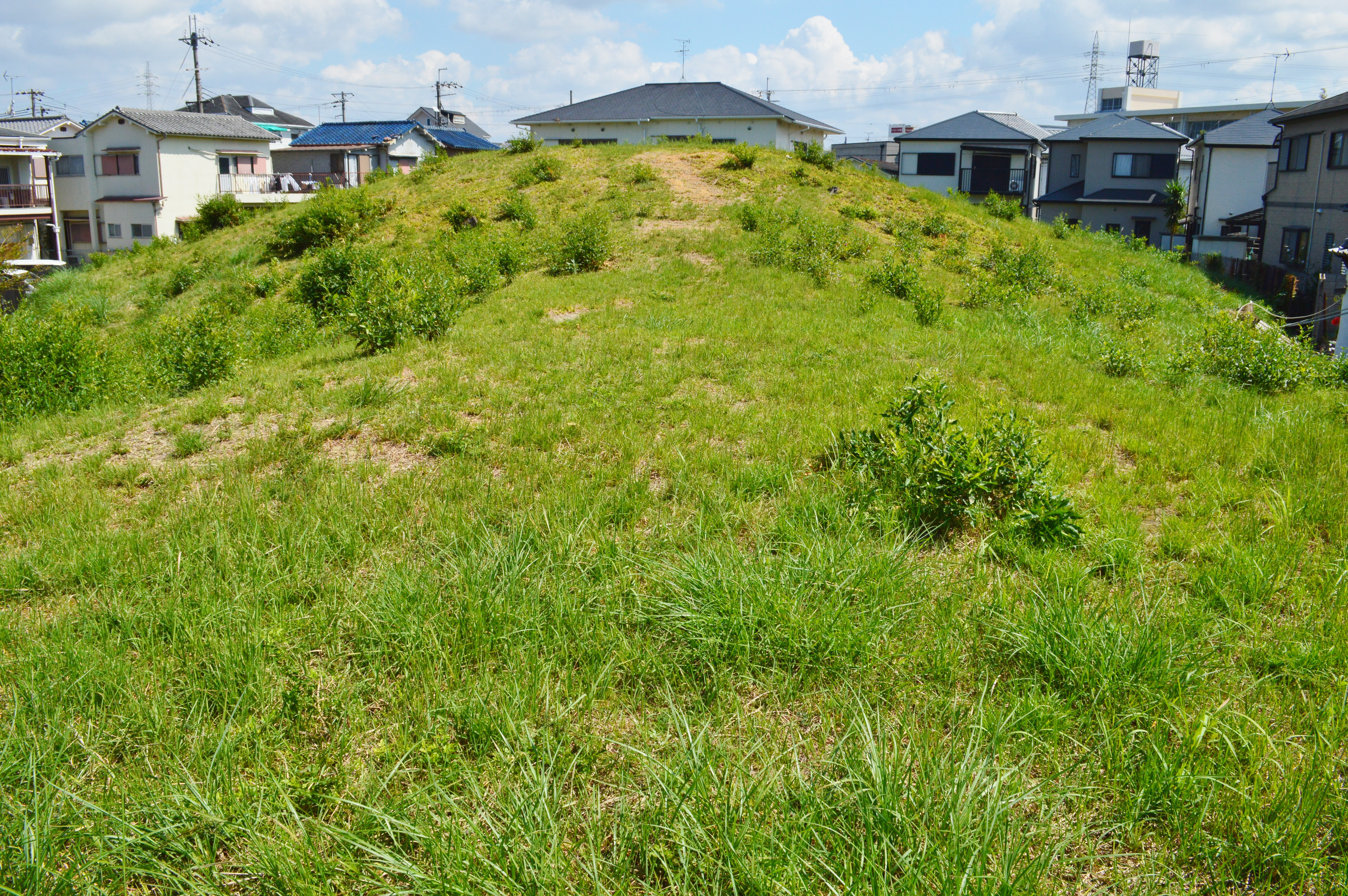
Posterior from the anterior

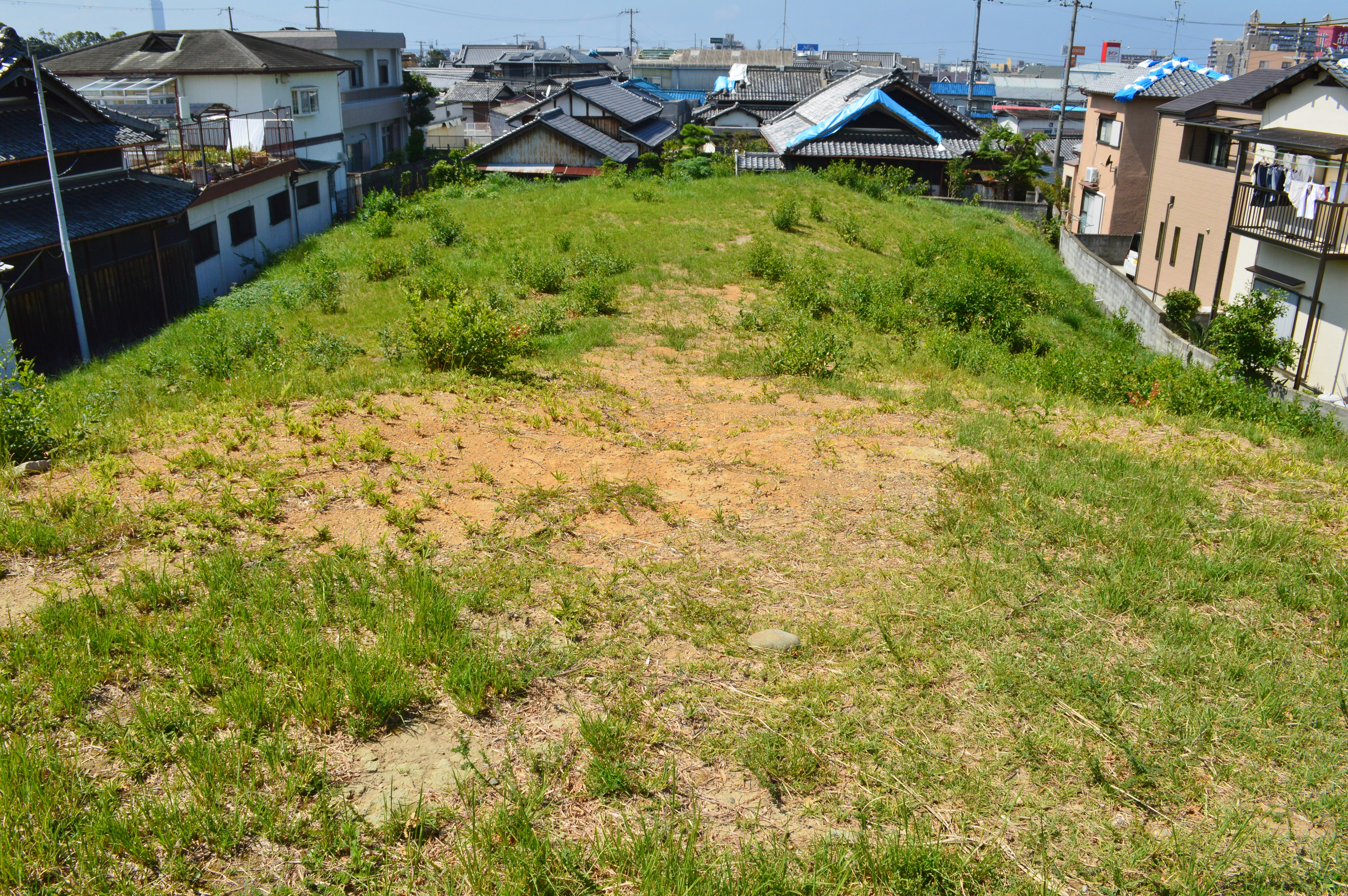
Anterior from the posterior

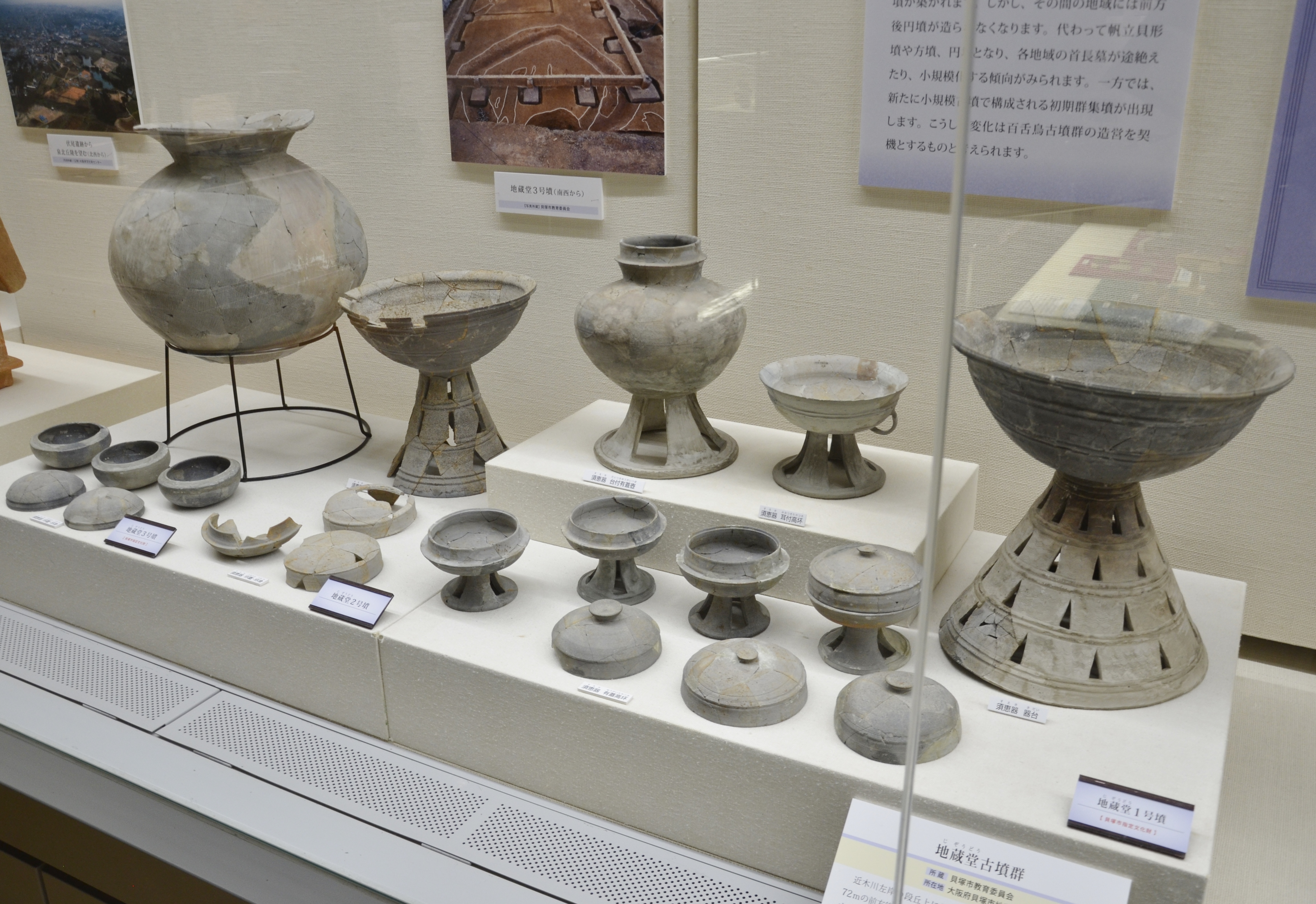
excavated haniwa

== See also ==
- List of Historic Sites of Japan (Osaka)
