= Takamiya temple ruins =

Asuka period Buddhist temple ruins

- 高宮廃寺跡 (Japanese)
- Takamiya temple ruins Takamiya temple ruins (Japan)
- Interactive map of Takamiya temple ruins
- 34°45′21″N 135°38′19″E
- Type: temple ruins
- Periods: Asuka period
- Location: Neyagawa, Osaka, Japan
- Region: Kansai region

Site notes
- Public access: Yes

The Takamiya temple ruins (高宮廃寺跡, Takamiya Haiji ato), is an archaeological site with the ruins of an Asuka period Buddhist temple located in the Takamiya neighborhood of the city of Neyagawa, Osaka, Japan. The ruined temple grounds were designated as a National Historic Site in 1980.

== Overview ==
The Takamiya temple ruins are located on at the southern end of the Kori hill, which extends southwest from the Ikoma Mountains. The existence of an ancient temple ruin within the precincts of the Takamiya Omori Goso Jinja has been known since at least the Edo period, with a cornerstone of the vanished temple's West Pagoda located between the shrine's Haiden and Honden, and the foundations of the East Pagoda to the west, and what seemed to have been the foundations of the Kondō to the north. In 1953, the Osaka Prefectural Board of Education conducted a confirmation survey of the remains of the East Pagoda, and unearthed a large quantity of roof tiles that date to the latter half of the 7th century.

At the end of 1979, a plan to create a residential development just north of the shrine led to a more extensive survey to confirm the range of the entire temple ruins in order to preserve this temple site. The surveys have confirmed the foundations of the Kondo, Lecture Hall, Middle Gate, South Gate, and part of the eastern cloister and western palisade in a layout patterned after Yakushi-ji in Nara. The base of the Kondō is 13 meters east–west and 11.5 meters north–south, and is made by rammed earth of reddish brown, and has an existing height of 60 centimeters. No cornerstones remain. The remains of the Lecture Hall, which was detected 30 meters north of the Kondō platform, have undergone considerable flattening due to the replacement of bamboo grove soil. It was judged to have originally been 16 meters east–west and 12 meters north–south. As for the Middle gate and the South gate, a part of the foundations for each has been detected, but the overall scale has yet to be determined. From the ruins of the Lecture Hall, roof tiles from the Kamakura to Muromachi period were excavated in concentration, accompanied by burnt soil, suggesting that the temple was destroyed by fire and not rebuilt.

== See also ==
- List of Historic Sites of Japan (Osaka)
