= Sumiyoshi Angū =

- 住吉行宮 (Japanese)
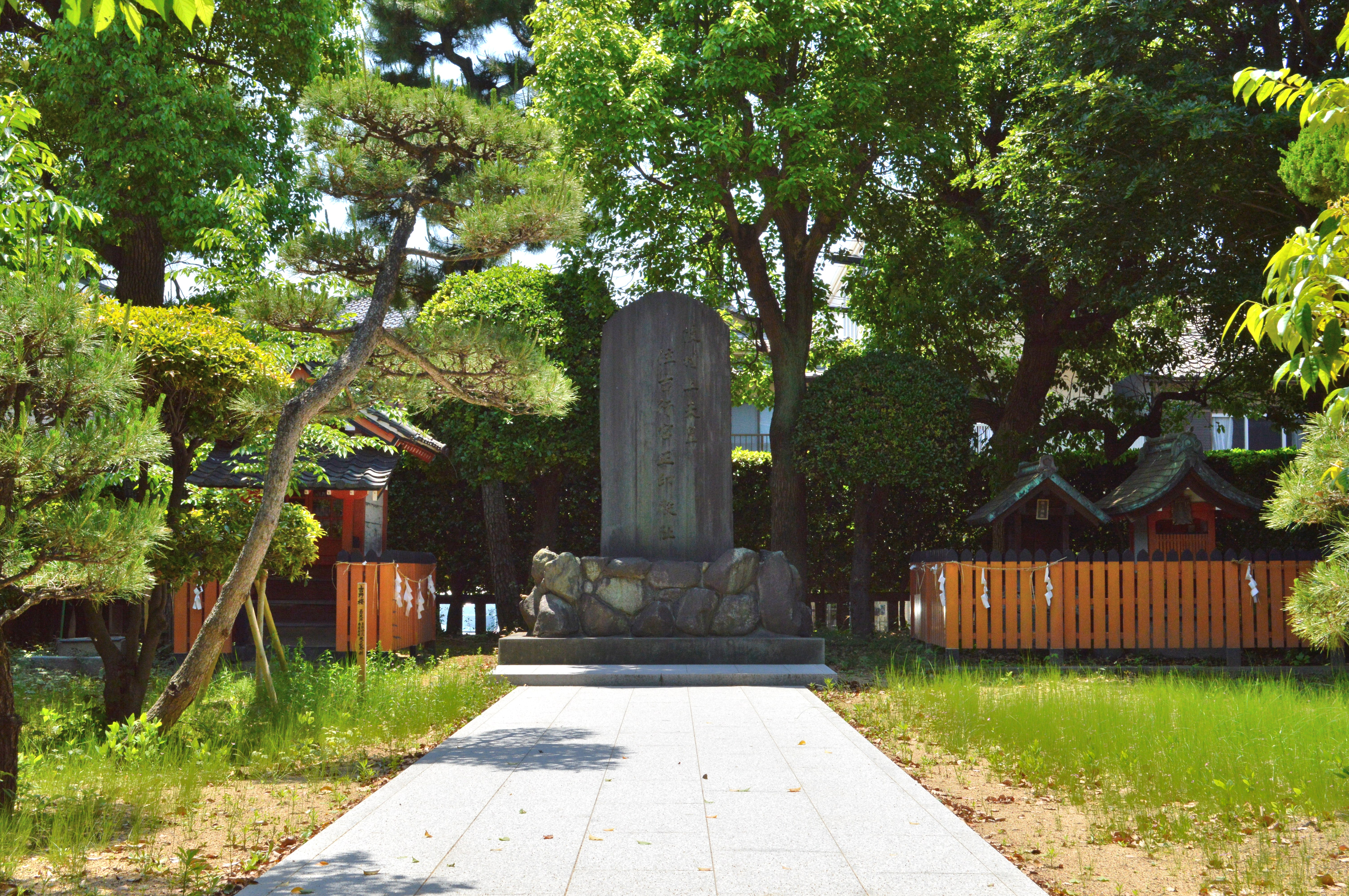
- Sumiyoshi Angū

- Sumiyoshi Angū Sumiyoshi Angū (Japan)
- Interactive map of Sumiyoshi Angū
- 34°36′31.35″N 135°29′38.00″E
- Type: Palace site
- Periods: Nanboku-chō period
- Location: Sumiyoshi-ku, Osaka, Japan
- Region: Kansai region

Site notes
- Public access: Yes (no facilities)

The Sumiyoshi Angū (住吉行宮) was the location of a temporary palace of the Southern Court during the Nanboku-chō period of Japanese history. It was located in Sumie, Sumiyoshi-ku, Osaka in the Kansai region of Japan. The site was designated a National Historic Site of Japan in 1939. The Sumiyoshi Angū was located about 300 meters south of Sumiyoshi Taisha Shrine.

== Overview ==
Emperor Go-Murakami of the Southern Court, who ascended to the throne in 1339 left Ano in Yoshino in 1352 and visited the temple of Kongō-ji in Kawachi Province, and took the opportunity to designate Shoin-den, a shrine structure built to house the shrine's sacred seal, which was located at the residence of Tsumori Kuninatsu, the chief priest of Sumiyoshi Taisha, as his temporary palace. This first visit was of less a month in duration, from February 28, 1352, to February 15 (leap month) when the Southern Court forces advanced to Iwashimizu Hachiman-gu. He used the site again from September 1360, when the Southern Court forces temporarily gained the upper hand due to internal conflicts within the Ashikaga shogunate and the strategies of Kusunoki Masanori to his death on March 11, 1368. It is believed that he used this location due to its geographic proximity to Kyoto, it is would enable him to quickly enter the capital should the Southern Court's forces prevailed.

His successor, Emperor Chōkei ascended to the throne at the Sumiyoshi Angū, but returned to Yoshino on December 24, 1368. None of the buildings from this period survive. In 1868, Emperor Meiji visited Sumiyoshi Taisha and took a short rest in the reconstructed Shoin-den Hall. It was designated as an Osaka Prefecture designated historic site in June 1938, and was designated as a national historic site on March 7, 1939.

The site is about a 15-minute walk from Sumiyoshitaisha Station on the Nankai Electric Railway Nankai Main Line. Entry to the site is prohibited, and visitors can only see a commemorative stone stele from outside the fence.

== See also ==
- List of Historic Sites of Japan (Osaka)
