= Tezukayama Kofun =

Kofun period keyhole-shaped burial mound in Japan

- 帝塚山古墳 (Japanese)
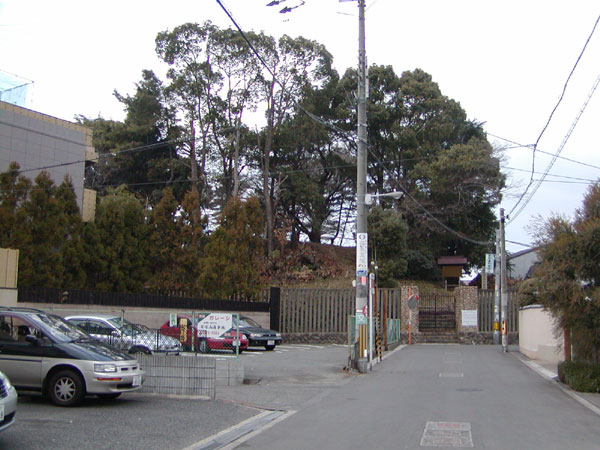
- Tezukayama Kofun

- Tezukayama Kofun Tezukayama Kofun (Japan)
- Interactive map of Tezukayama Kofun
- 34°37′17.61″N 135°29′48.58″E
- Type: Kofun
- Periods: Kofun period
- Location: Sumiyoshi-ku, Osaka, Japan
- Region: Kansai region

History
- Built: c.4th century

Site notes
- Public access: Yes (no facilities)

Tezukayama Kofun (帝塚山古墳) is a Kofun period keyhole-shaped burial mound, located in the Tezukayama neighborhood of Sumiyoshi-ku, Osaka in the Kansai region of Japan. The tumulus was designated a National Historic Site of Japan in 1963.

== Overview ==
The Tezukayama Kofun is a zenpō-kōen-fun (前方後円墳), which is shaped like a keyhole, having one square end and one circular end, when viewed from above. It is located on the western slope of the Uemachi Plateau, at an elevation of about 14 meters. Many ancient tumuli were built on the Uemachi Plateau, but almost all have been destroyed by the later urban development, leaving the Tezukayama tumulus is one of the few remaining. Although a tumulus in an urban area, it has relatively well preserved its original state and has the characteristics of the middle Kofun period. The tumulus is about 88 meters long, with a posterior circular diameter of about 49 meters and a height of about 9 meters. The anterior rectangular portion has a width of about 39 meters and a height of about 8 meters. The existence of fukiishi roofing stones, a row of cylindrical haniwa clay figurines, and traces of a moat have been confirmed. Although the contents of the tomb and grave goods are unknown, it is believed to have been built between the end of the 4th century and the beginning of the 5th century.

Currently, there is only one Tezukayama Kofun, but until the Meiji period, there were two tumuli, one large and one small, commonly called "Dai-tezuka" and "Koto-tezuka." They were popularly believed in local folklore to be the graves of Ōtomo no Kanamura and his Ōtomo no Satehiko, who were members of the ancient powerful Ōtomo clan, who had a mansion in this area. However, Ōtomo no Kanamura was a person from the first half of the 6th century, so the dates do not quite match; however, this area was a stronghold of the Ōtomo clan in the late 4th century. Dai-tezuka is now the site of the Tezukayama Gakuin school, and Ko-tezuka remains as Tezukayama Kofun.

During the special army maneuvers held in November 1898, a monument commemorating Emperor Meiji's visit to Tezukayama stands on the mound

The tumulus is about a five-minute walk from Tezukayama Station on the Nankai Electric Railway Kōya Line.

== See also ==
- List of Historic Sites of Japan (Osaka)
