= Makino Kurumazuka Kofun =

Kofun period burial mound in Hirakata, Japan

- 牧野車塚古墳 (Japanese)
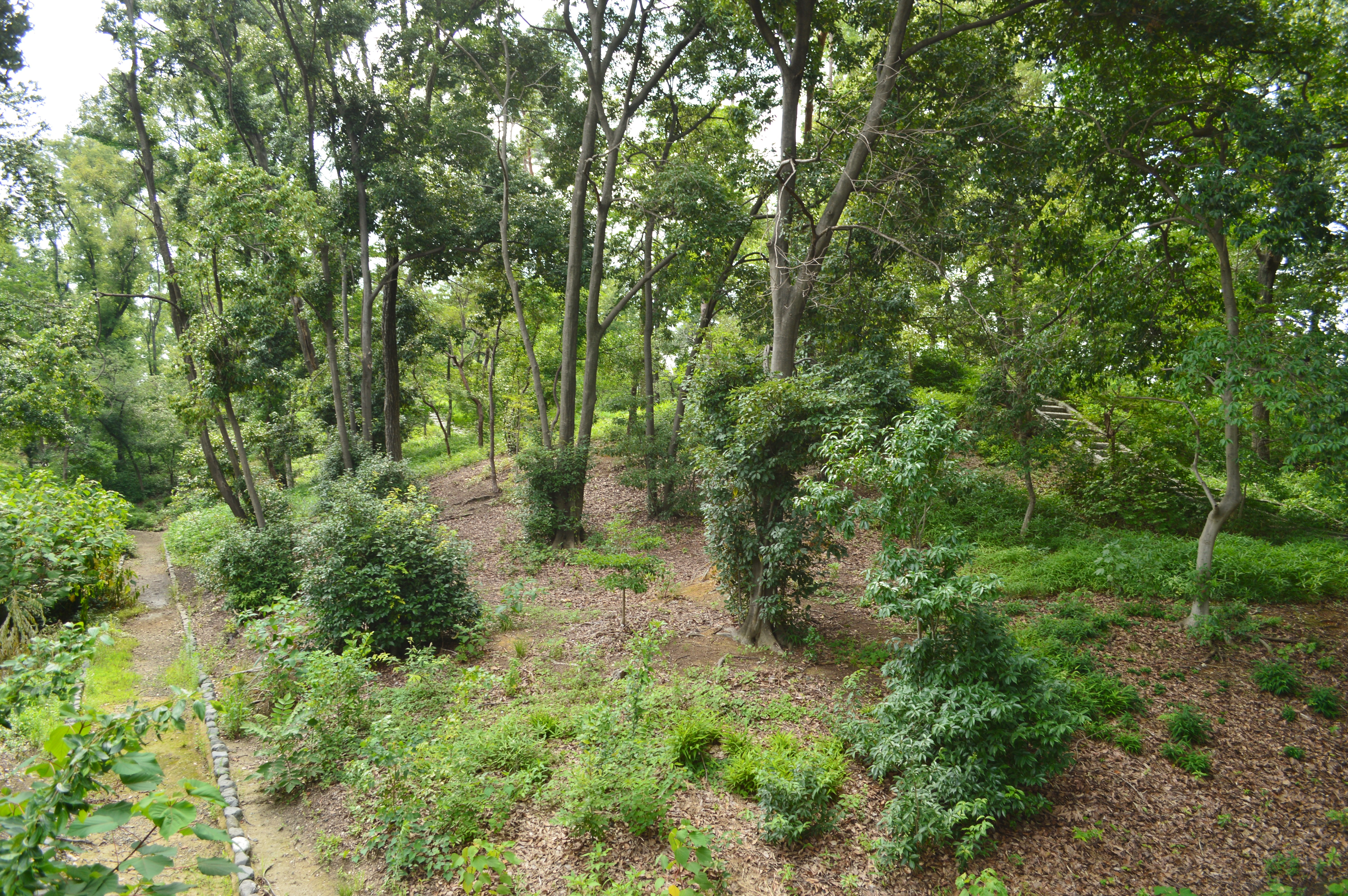
- Makino Kurumazuka Kofun

- Makino Kurumazuka Kofun Makino Kurumazuka Kofun (Japan)
- Interactive map of Makino Kurumazuka Kofun
- 34°50′0.55″N 135°40′8.7″E
- Type: Kofun
- Periods: Kofun period
- Location: Hirakata, Osaka, Japan
- Region: Kansai region

History
- Built: c.late 4th century

Site notes
- Public access: Yes (Park)

The Makino Kurumazuka Kofun (牧野車塚古墳) is a Kofun period keyhole-shaped burial mound, located in the Ogura Higashimachi neighborhood of the city of Hirakata, Osaka in the Kansai region of Japan. The tumulus was designated a National Historic Site of Japan in 1922 with the area under protection expanded in 1980.

== Overview ==
The Makino Kurumazuka Kofun is a zenpō-kōen-fun (前方後円墳), which is shaped like a keyhole, having one square end and one circular end, when viewed from above. It is located an elevation of 22 meters, on the northern edge of the Hirakata Plateau formed on the left bank of the Yodo River. The main axis is in the east-west direction parallel to the terrain with the front orientated to the east. It has a total length of 107.5 meters with a posterior circular portion diameter of 54.5 meters. It is surrounded by an empty moat with a width of ten meters, of which there are remnants of the outer embankment on the west and south sides the tumulus. The interior of the tumulus has never been excavated, so the details of its internal structure, and the presence of any grave goods is unknown. Fukiishi and haniwa have been found on the surface of the tumulus. The fukiishi are unique in that stone slabs made from stone from Tokushima and Hyogo Prefectures are used, rather than local river rocks as is common at most other sites.

From the shape of the tumulus and the types of haniwa found in the vicinity, it is estimated to date from the middle of the Kofun period, or the late 4th century. To the southwest of this tumulus were once several smaller kofun, with names such as Akatsuka, Gongenzuka, Kodozuka, and Shogazuka, but all of these tumuli have been destroyed by urban encroachment.

Currently, the Makino Kurumazuka Kofun is being maintained as part of "Kurumazuka Park". It is located about a 20-minute walk from Makino Station on the Keihan Main Line.

Total length
107.5 meters:
Anterior rectangular portion
44 meters wide, 2-tier
Posterior circular portion
54.5 meter diameter, 2-tiers

== Gallery ==
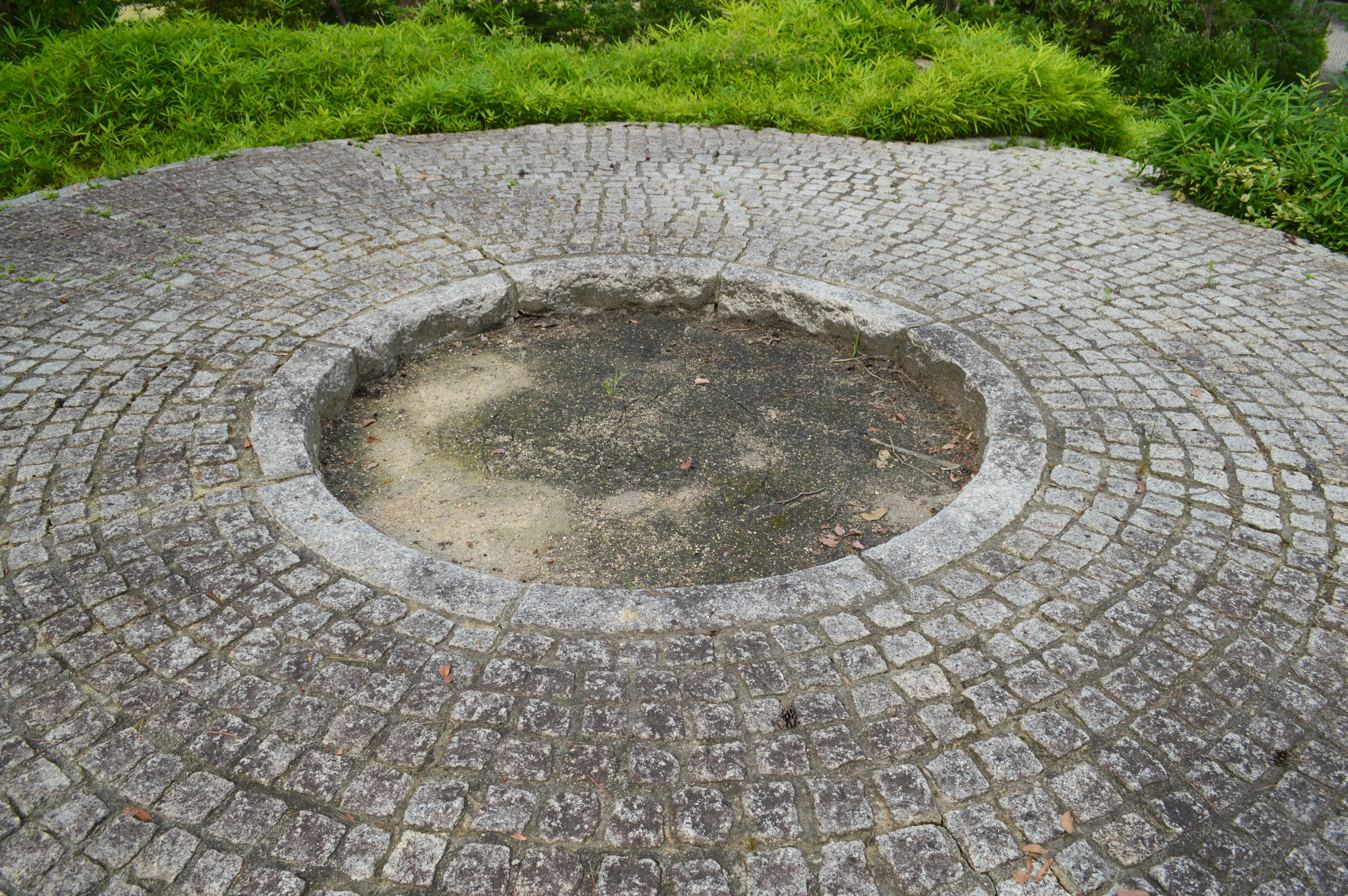
Top of the posterior portion

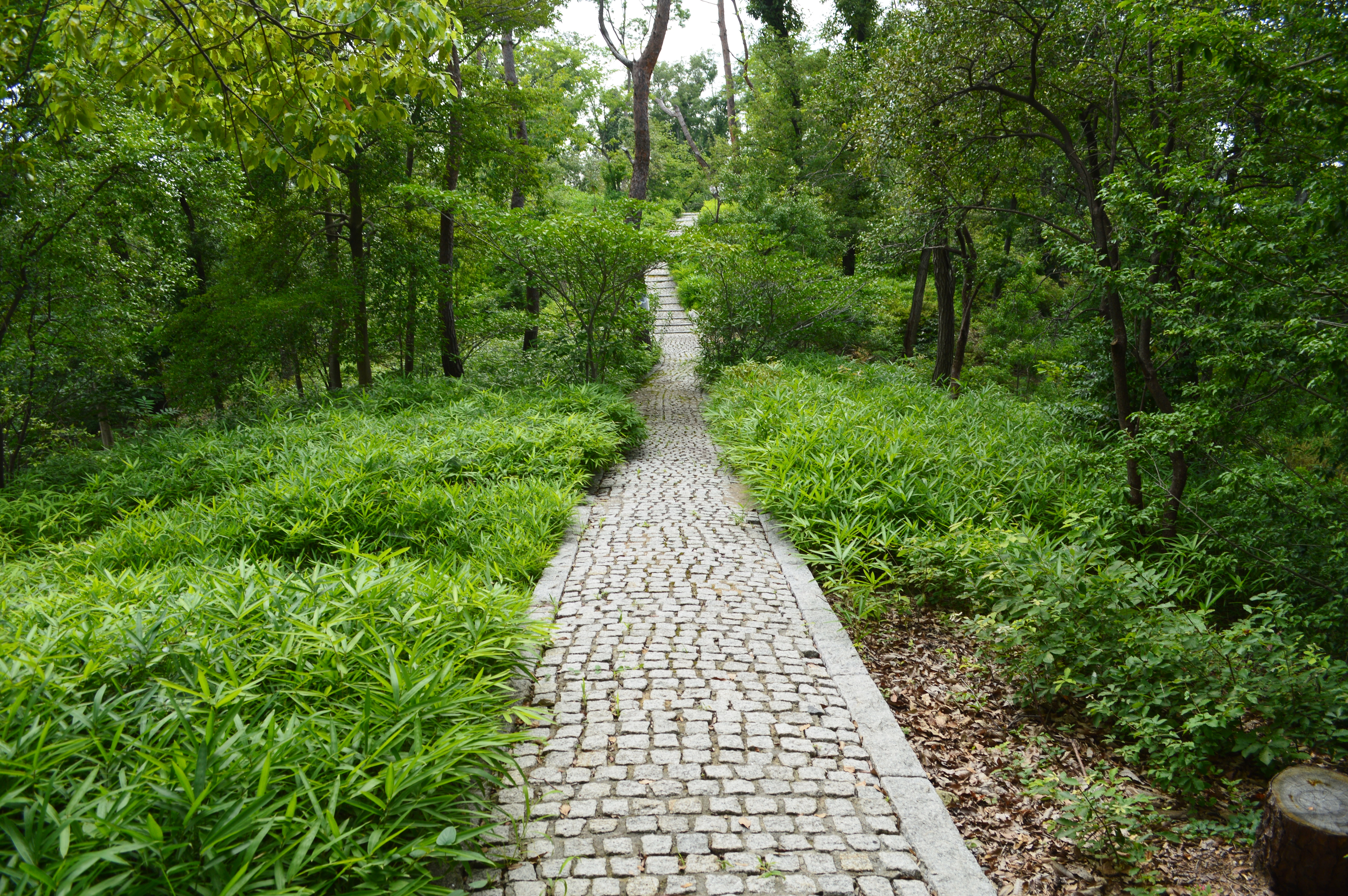
Anterior looking towards Posterior

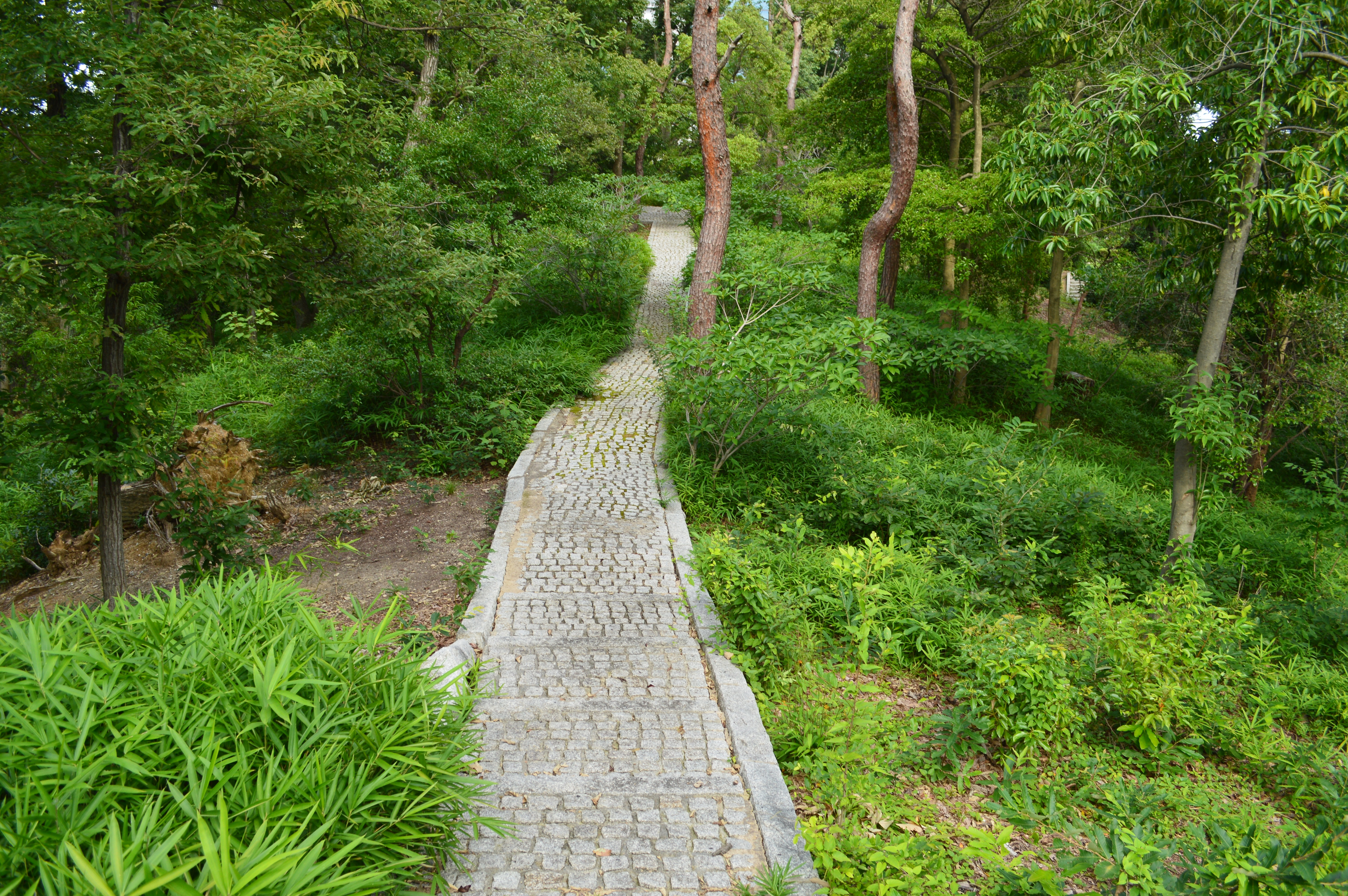
Posterior looking towards anterior

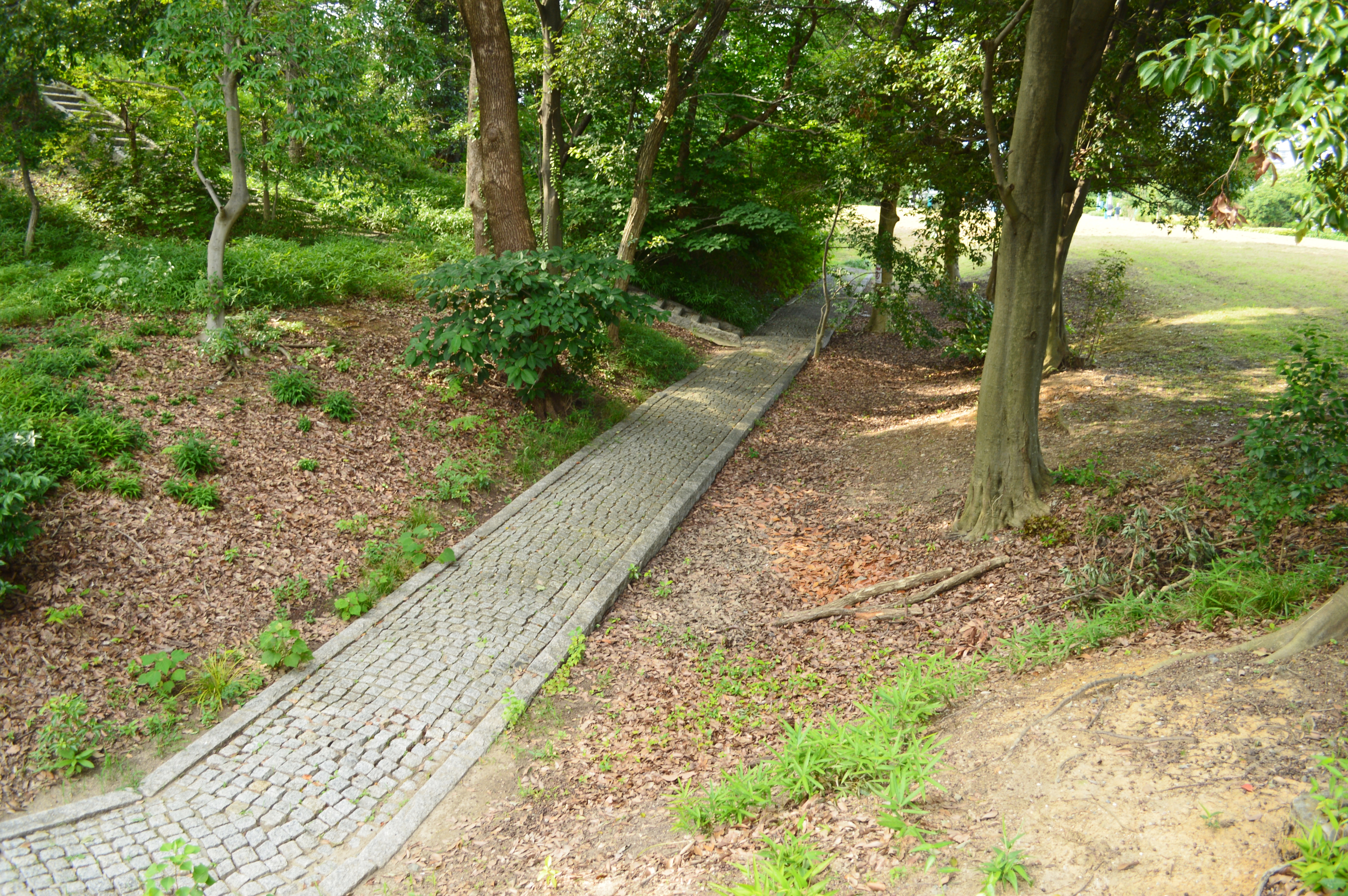
Remnant of moat

== See also ==
- List of Historic Sites of Japan (Osaka)
