= Sakurazuka Kofun Cluster =

Sakurazuka Kofun cluster
- 桜塚古墳群 (Japanese)
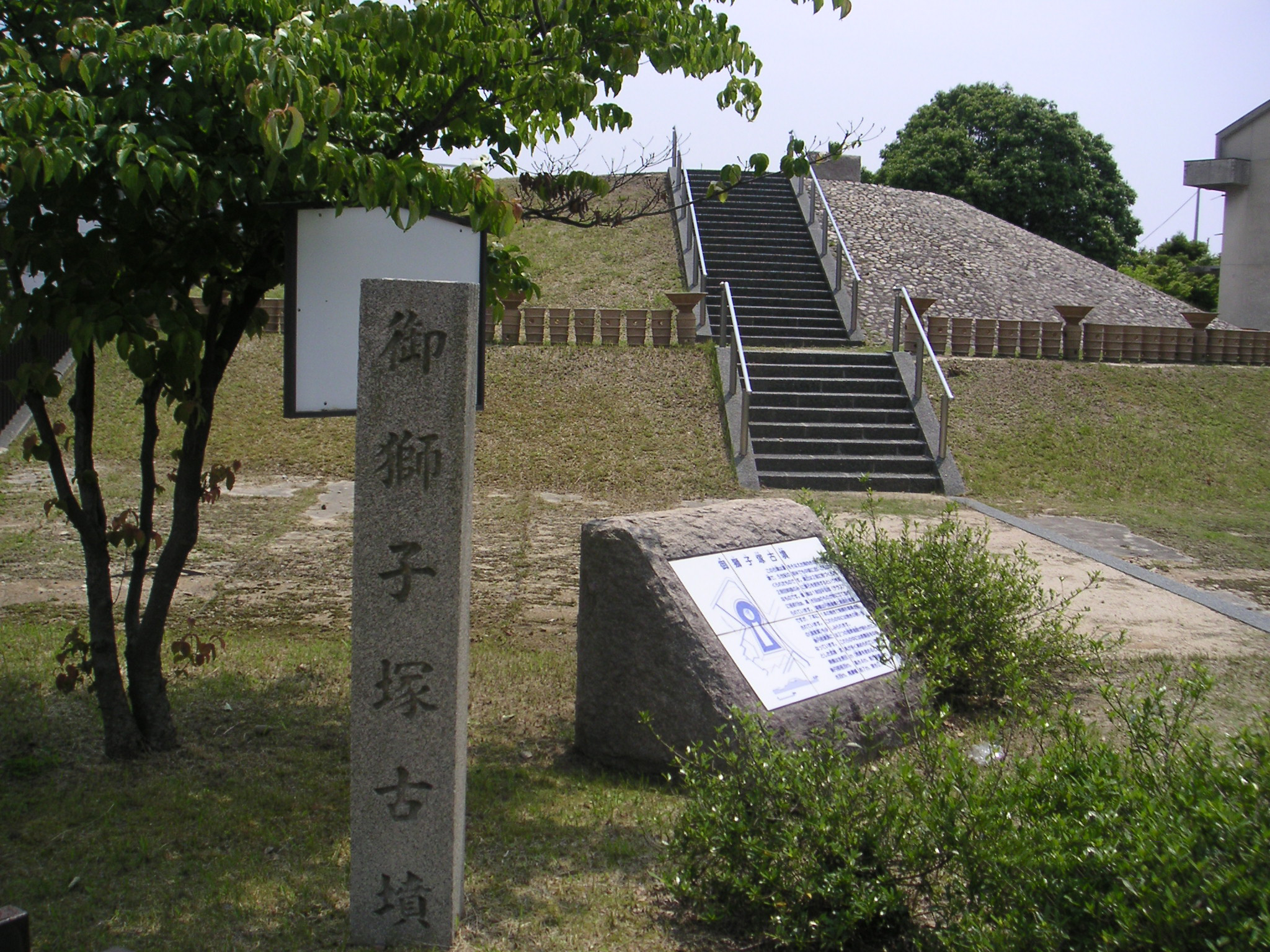
- Oshishizuka Kofun

- Sakurazuka Kofun cluster' Sakurazuka Kofun Cluster (Japan)
- Interactive map of Sakurazuka Kofun cluster
- 34°46′45.22″N 135°27′46.16″E
- Type: Kofun
- Periods: Kofun period
- Location: Toyonaka, Osaka, Japan
- Region: Kansai region

History
- Built: c.6th century

Site notes
- Public access: Yes (no facilities)

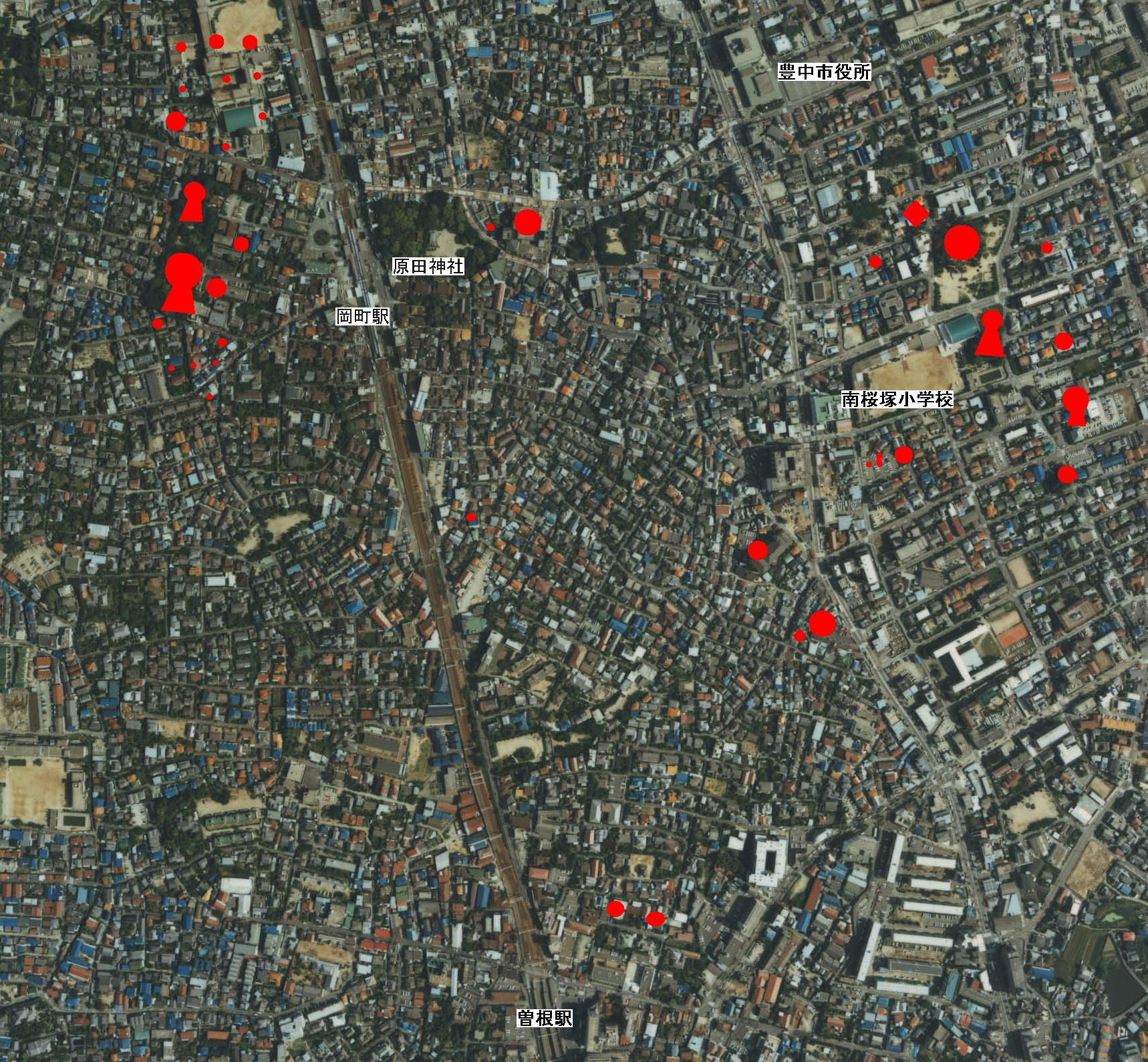
Aerial photograph with overlay of locations of tumuli in the Sakurazuka Kofun cluster, many of which are now destroyed

Sakurazuka Kofun cluster (桜塚古墳群) is a group of Kofun period burial mounds, located in the Okamachi, Nakasakurazuka, and Minamisakurazuka neighborhoods of the city of Toyonaka, Osaka in the Kansai region of Japan. The surviving five tumuli in this cluster were collectively designated a National Historic Site of Japan, with the Ōishizuka Kofuna and Koishizuka Kofun designated in 1956, and the remaining three added in 1987, with the area around the Koishiuzka Kofun expanded in 1998.

== Overview ==
Sakurazuka Kofun cluster is located on a low terrace at an elevation of about 20–25 meters in the center of the Toyonaka Plateau. They are distributed in an area of 1.2 kilometers east-to-west and 1 kilometer north-to-south near the center of Toyonaka City. Large-scale surveys of this group of tumuli were conducted in 1874, 1879, and 1881, during which time 36 tumuli were identified and sketched. Eight more were found in a subsequent survey in 1930, which determined that the cluster could be divided into two groups: one constructed in the latter half of the early Kofun period (4th century), and the end of the middle to early late Kofun period (6th century). However, 39 of these tumuli were destroyed by urban encroachment with the development of large scale residential housing districts. The remaining five have been excavated and preserved.

Ōishizuka Kofun

The Ōishizuka Kofun (大石塚古墳) is located at the western end of the Sakurazuka Kofun cluster. It is located at 34°46′45.22″N 135°27′46.16″E. It is a zenpō-kōen-fun (前方後円墳), which is shaped like a keyhole, having one square end and one circular end, when viewed from above, and is orientated to the south. It appears to have been constructed so that its main axis roughly aligned in the north-south direction with Koishizuka Kofun located to the north. It was excavated in 1979. It is the largest tumulus in the Sakurazuka Kofun cluster, with a three-tiered structure, a total length of over 80 meters, and a diameter of about 48 meters at the rear mound, and a height of five meters. The mound is covered with river stones as fukiishi roofing stones, and each terrace surface is covered with pebbles, which is said to be the origin of the name "Ishizuka". In the past, cylindrical and morning glory-shaped haniwa were placed in groups of three on the flat surface of the mound. After the survey and excavation, they are exhibited at the Toyonaka Municipal Traditional Performing Arts Museum. It was first designated a National Historic Site in 1956. Based on the haniwa excavated, it is believed to have been built in the latter half of the early Kofun period, or the mid-4th century.

Koishizuka Kofun

The Koiishizuka Kofun (小石塚古墳) is also a zenpō-kōen-fun keyhole-shaped kofun, located to the north of Ōishizuka Kofun and orientated south. A shallow valley runs between the two tumuli, but the main axes are almost aligned. It is 49 meters long, with the 29.0 meter diameter rear circular mound constructed in two tiers and the front rectangular mound constructed in one tier. As with the Ōishizuka Kofun, it has a moat only on the east side. It does not use fukiishi roofing stones, but does have haniwa clay figures. The haniwa are jar-shaped, morning glory-shaped, cylindrical, and other shapes, but due to the severe damage to the mound, they were all found loose, and their original location and arrangement are unknown. A burial chamber has been confirmed at the top of the circular mound along the main axis. Judging from the shape of the coffin, it is assumed that it was a split bamboo-shaped wooden coffin, and that it was buried with its head facing north. The coffin was wrapped in fine yellowish-white clay, filled with reddish-yellowish-brown gravel around it, and covered with gravel underneath.

Ōtsuka Kofun

The Ōtsuka Kofun (大塚古墳) is located in the eastern group of Sakurazuka Kofun cluster. It is located at 34°46′46.46″N 135°28′20.68″E. In the 1930s, the northern and western foot of the tumulus were partially removed due to land readjustment work carried out in the surrounding area. In the 1970s, grave goods were found to be exposed from the top of the mound, and in 1983, a rescue excavation was conducted. The tumulus is a three-tiered enpun (円墳)-style circular tomb measuring 56.0 by 46.9 meters with a height of 18 meters, and with a moat 12 to 13 meters wide, with a diameter of about 80 meters. It is thought to have been built around the beginning of the 5th century. At the top of the tomb were three burials arranged side-by-side with the main axis running north to south. The eastern coffin has a unique structure in which fist-sized stones filled in the burial chamber to surround both ends of the coffin. The west coffin had already been heavily damaged by grave robbers, but two long, split-bamboo-shaped wooden coffins, each up to 7.1 meters long, were lined up north-to-south. Grave goods such as bronze mirrors, iron armor, iron swords, and shields were excavated from inside the east coffin. These were designated as an Important Cultural Property and are kept by the Toyonaka City Board of Education. In 1990, the surrounding area was developed as a historic park.

Oshishizuka Kofun

The Oshishizuka Kofun (御獅子塚古墳) is also a zenpō-kōen-fun keyhole-shaped kofun, located 50 meters south of Ōtsuka Kofun in the eastern group of Sakurazuka Kofun cluster. It is located at 34°46′42.81″N 135°28′22.54″E. It is the second largest kofun in the cluster after the Ōtsuka Kofun. Part of the eastern part of the circular mound was removed during a land readjustment project in the 1930s, and later, part of the western part of the circular mound and the moat around the front were destroyed with the construction of a gymnasium and swimming pool at the neighboring Minami Sakurazuka Elementary School. As the mound was also subject to severe natural collapse, and was excavated in 1985 and 1990. The total length of the tumulus including the moat is 70 meters (49 meters without the moat) and the original diameter of the circular portion was 21.9 meters with a 3.6 meter height. The mound is built in two stages, with only the second slope covered with fukiishi roofing stones, giving it a unique appearance. Cylindrical haniwa clay figures were densely planted, including some made of Sue ware. Many fragments of figurative haniwa have also been excavated, including houses, lids, ridgepole figures, shields, and animals, as well as fragments of a high-rise ware from early Sue ware. Two burials with the bodies perpendicular to each other have been found at the top of the mound. In the first burial, historically valuable relics were found, notably a triangular plate riveted short armor and a small scale riveted horned helmet, as well as farming tools, horse equipment, and lacquered leather shields in good condition, and about 400 pieces of jewelry such as magatama were also excavated. In the second burial , a set of armor and neck and shoulder armor with accessories, one large iron sword, three spears, four spears, 184 iron arrowheads, rivets, and shields were excavated. The iron weapons and armor excavated from the Oshishizuka Tomb are valuable materials that clearly show the state of the period when continental technology was introduced. It is also a rare example of a leather shield being fully revealed, and is the only one from the 5th century that has been preserved.

Minami Tenpinzuka Kofun

After three-quarters of the Minami Tenpinzuka Kofun (南天平塚) was destroyed by road construction associated with the land readjustment project in the 1930s, a rescue archaeology survey indicated that it was a two-tiered circular tomb with a diameter of about 18 meters and a height of 5.5 meters, with a row of cylindrical haniwa. In the southeast, a protruding area surrounded by the row of cylindrical haniwa was discovered. This led to its designation as a hotategaigata kofun (帆立貝形古墳), or scallop-shaped kofun. It is located at 34°46′37.79″N 135°28′25.90″E. A re-investigation in 1991 found a surrounding moat 7 to 8 meters wide above the row of haniwa on the first terrace. Two split bamboo-shaped wooden coffins were discovered 2.5 meters below the top of the tomb. Along with these, a replica six-animal bronze mirror, an iron sword, an iron sword, a short armor, and a helmet were buried as grave goods, and there were traces of a leather shield on the coffin lid. In addition, horse equipment such as a saddle, stirrups, bridle, and apricot leaves were placed on both ends of the wooden coffin, and on the north side, a single iron spear was laid out, along with several bows in various colors of red and black. Although the wood of the spear had rotted away, the thread spool on the surface of the handle had remained as a lacquered coating, so the entire shape of the spear, which was 3.3 meters long from the tip to the ferrule, could be confirmed.

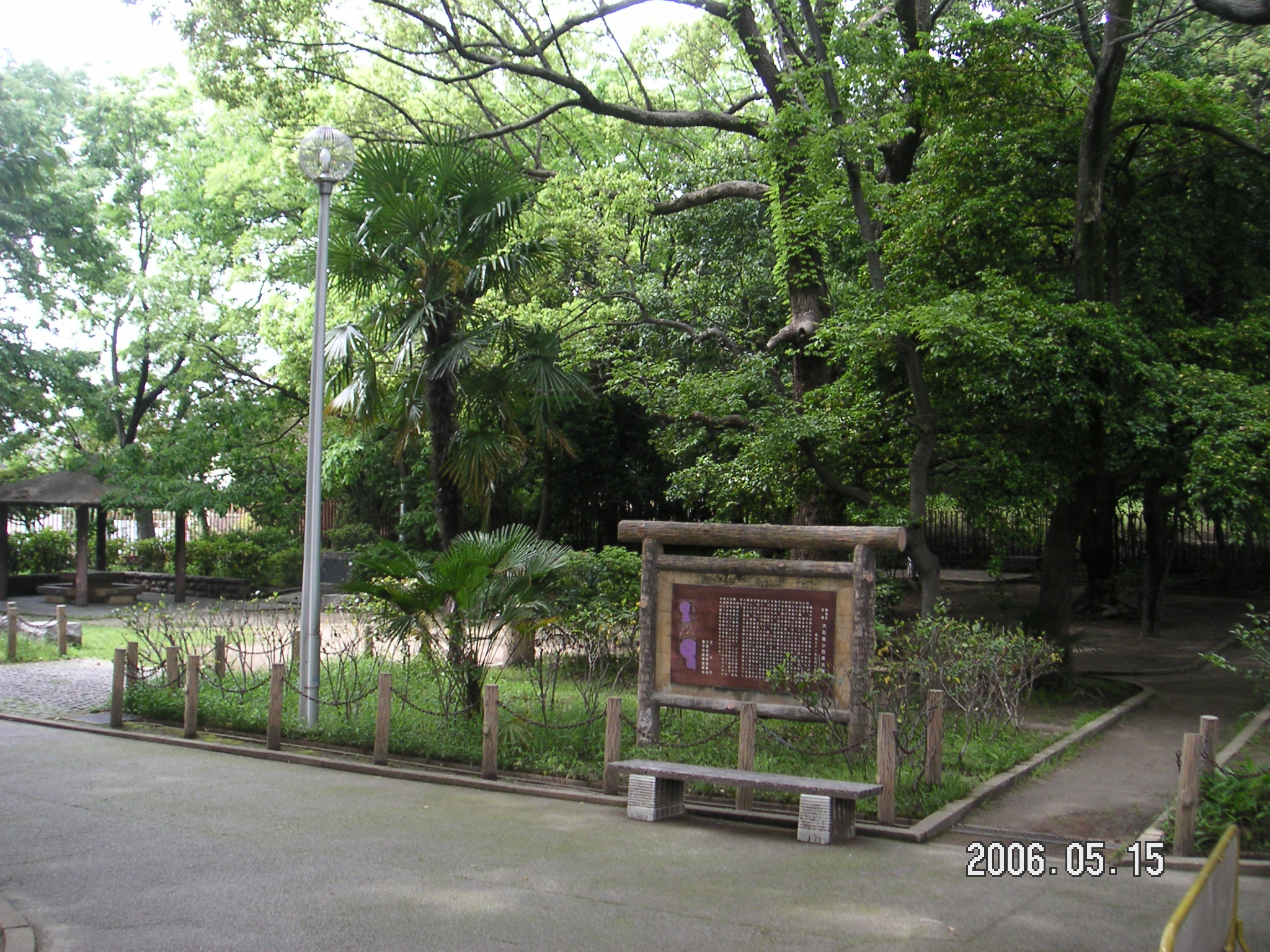
Koishizuka Kofun

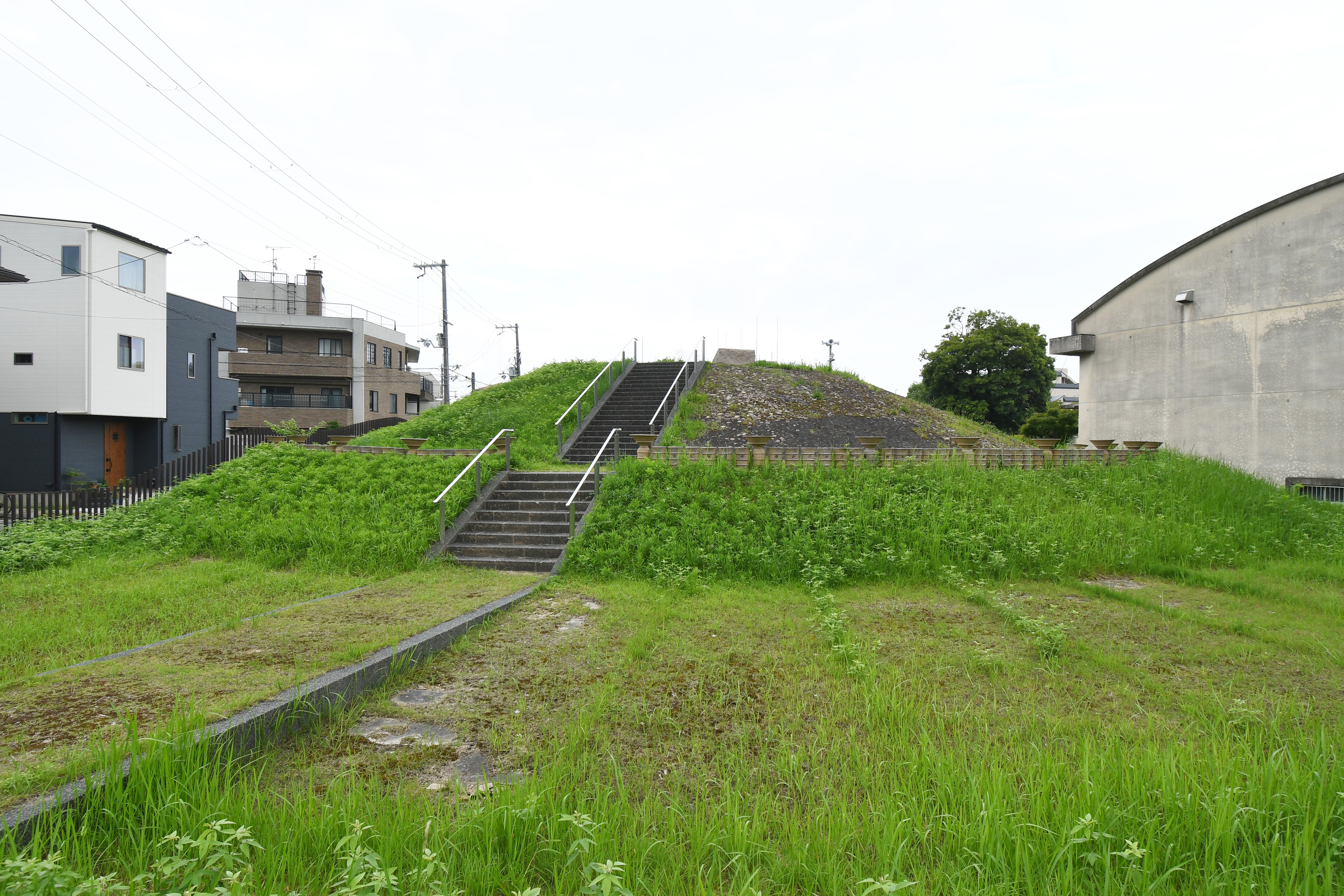
Oshishizuka Kofun

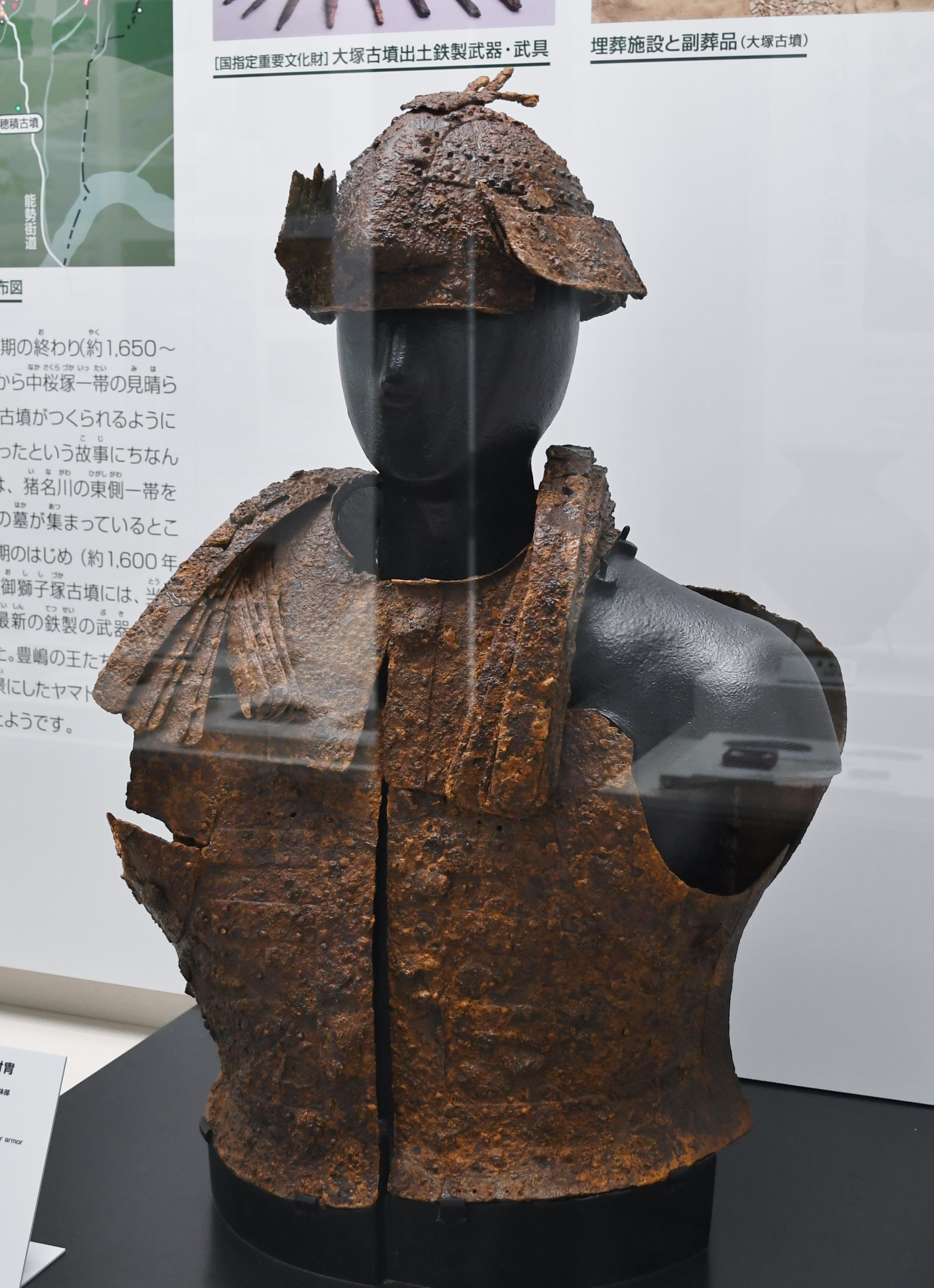
Armor found in the Oshishizuka Kofun

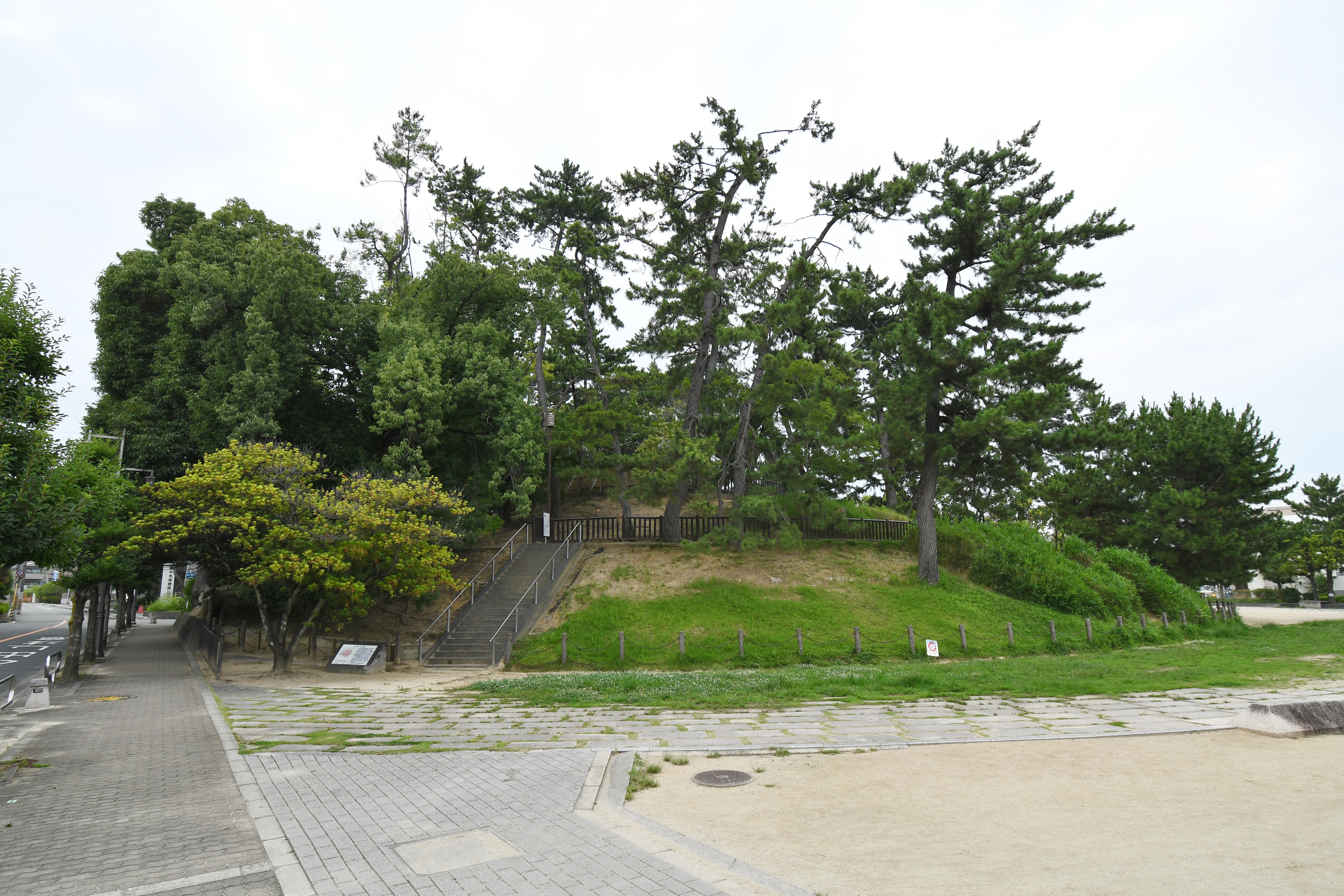
Ōtsuka Kofun

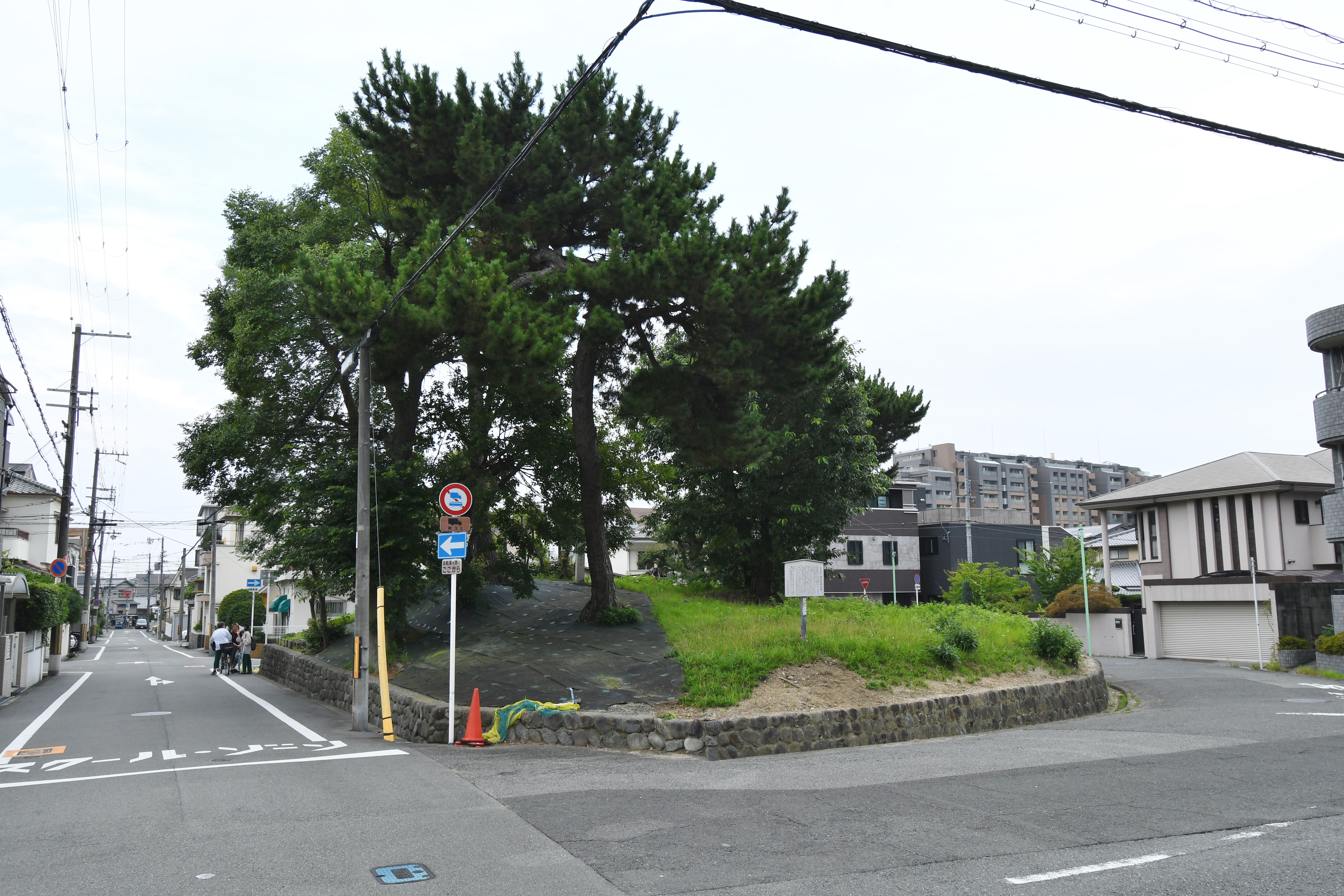
Minami Tenpinzuka Kofun

== See also ==
- List of Historic Sites of Japan (Osaka)
