= Nishikiori =

Nishikiori is a Japanese surname. Notable people and fictional characters with the surname include:

== People ==
- Arata Nishikiori (錦織新, born 1991), Japanese team handball player
- Hiroshi Nishikiori (錦織博, born 1966), Japanese director

== Fictional characters ==
- Tsubasa Nishikiori (錦織つばさ), a character in the Mazinger series.
