= Kishibe Tile Kiln Site =

Remains of Heian period kilns in Suita, Osaka, Japan

Kishibe tile kiln ruins
- 吉志部瓦窯跡 (Japanese)
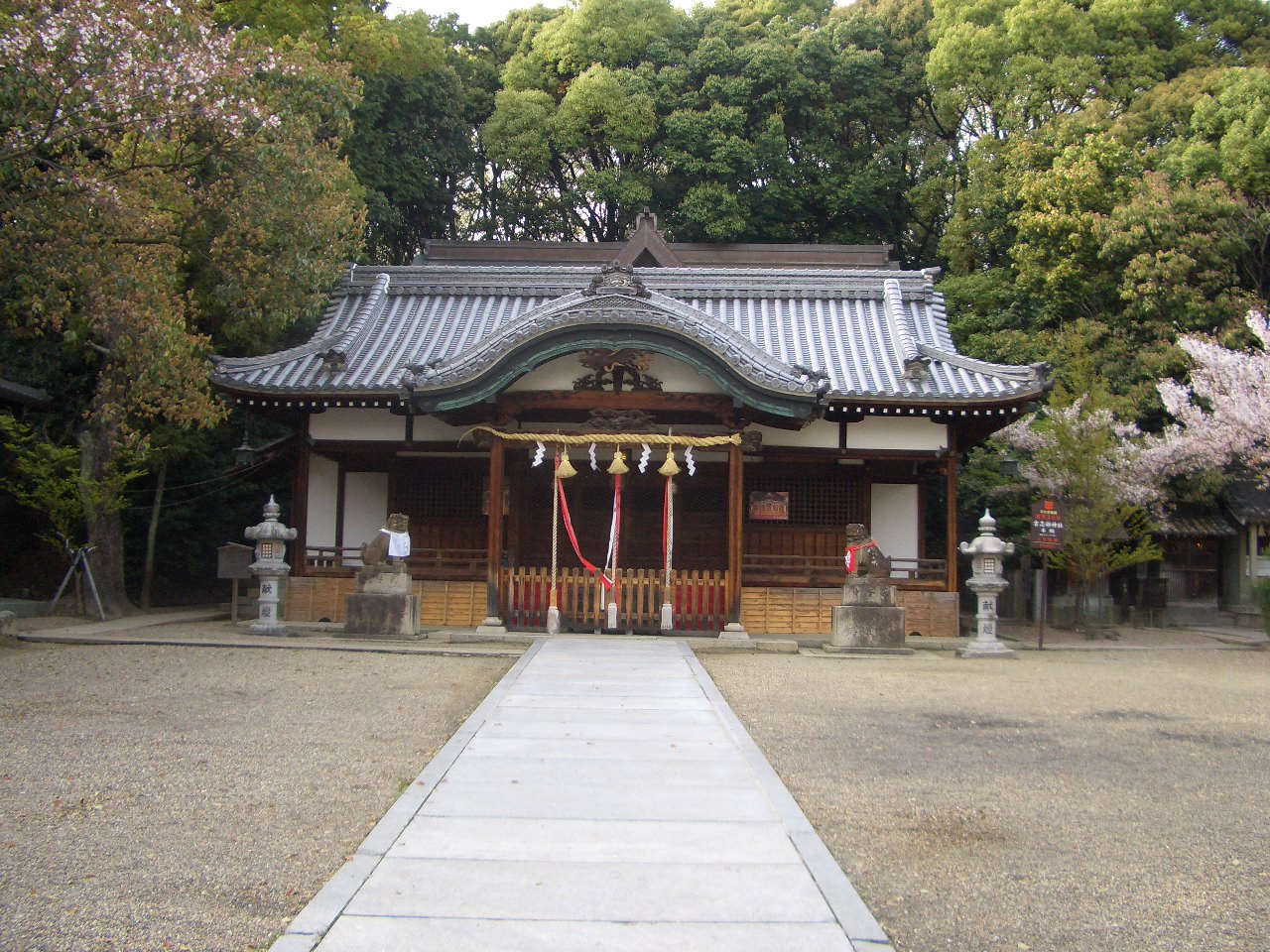
- Kishibe Jinja, where the Kishibe tile kiln ruins are located

- Kishibe tile kiln ruins Kishibe Tile Kiln Site (Japan)
- Interactive map of Kishibe tile kiln ruins
- 34°47′01″N 135°31′51″E
- Periods: Heian period
- Location: Suita, Osaka, Japan
- Region: Kansai region

Site notes
- Public access: Yes

Kishibe tile kiln ruins (吉志部瓦窯跡, Kishibe Kawara-gama ato) is an archaeological site consisting of the remains of Heian period kilns located in what is now the Kishibe-kita neighborhood of the city of Suita, Osaka Prefecture in the Kansai region of Japan. It has been protected by the central government as a National Historic Site since 1971.

== Overview ==
The Kishibe tile kiln ruins are located halfway up the southern slope of Shikinzan hills, which extends from the Senri Hills to the right bank of the Yodo River and is part of the precincts of Kishibe Shrine. The site consists of nine flat kilns and three climbing kilns arranged in two tiers, the upper tier being the climbing kilns and the lower tier being the flat kilns. The flat kilns have a semi-underground structure with a total length of about five meters, and both the combustion and firing sections are well preserved. The climbing kiln has a total length of about six meters and a width of about three meters, and the floor is covered with flat tiles. On the south side of the tile kiln, was the remains of a building with pillars, a well, a rotary table, and a clay mining site.

Green-glazed eaves tiles from the early to late Heian period were unearthed here, and green-glazed pottery was also found in the climbing kiln, indicating that the kiln was both a pottery and a tile-making kiln. The green-glazed roof tiles were fired in the flat kiln for the first firing and the second firing for the glazing stage in the climbing kiln. Among the excavated tiles, there are tiles that is considered to be identical to the roof tiles used in the construction of the early Heian Palace.

The site is maintained as "Shikinzan Park" and is about a 20-minute walk from Kishibe Station on the JR West Tokaido Main Line.

== See also ==
- List of Historic Sites of Japan (Osaka)
