= Atagozuka Kofun =

Tomb in Osaka, Japan

Coordinates: 34°38′10.43″N 135°38′47.42″E

Atagozuka Kofun (愛宕塚古墳, "Atagozuka ancient tomb") is a mounded tomb located in the Kōdachi area of Yao, Osaka, in Japan. It is the largest scallop-shaped burial mound, or kofun. It is a round burial mound 22.5 meters in diameter and 9 meters tall. It was constructed in the late sixth century, during the Asuka period.

== Later use ==
Atagozuka-kofun existed as a grave in the late 6th century and hosted additional burials. After that it also existed as a sacred place for some 200 years. The tomb was reused after the Heian period as shown by the excavation of two pieces of sueki (unglazed ware) of the early Heian period and also of black pottery, unglazed pottery, Hagi plates and hagama (kama with wing) of the middle and later Heian and Kamakura periods. An excavated five-ring pagoda and human bones of the Muromachi period show that this ancient tomb was used for additional burials in the medieval period.
