= Akasaka =

Akasaka may refer to:

== Places ==
- Akasaka Palace, which functions today as the State Guest-House
- Akasaka, Tokyo, a district of Minato, Tokyo
  - Akasaka Sacas, a facility in Akasaka, Tokyo
- Akasaka, Okayama, a town in the Akaiwa District, Okayama
- Akasaka-juku (Nakasendō), a post town on the Nakasendō
- Akasaka-juku (Tōkaidō), a post town on the Tōkaidō
- A district of Chihayaakasaka, Osaka, Japan

== Other uses ==
- Akasaka (surname)
- Akaneiro ni Somaru Saka, a visual novel by Feng adapted into an anime series

== See also ==
- Moto-Akasaka, a district in Tokyo, part of Minato ward
- Akasa (disambiguation)
