= Siege of Chihaya =

1333 siege in Japan

- Part of the Genkō War
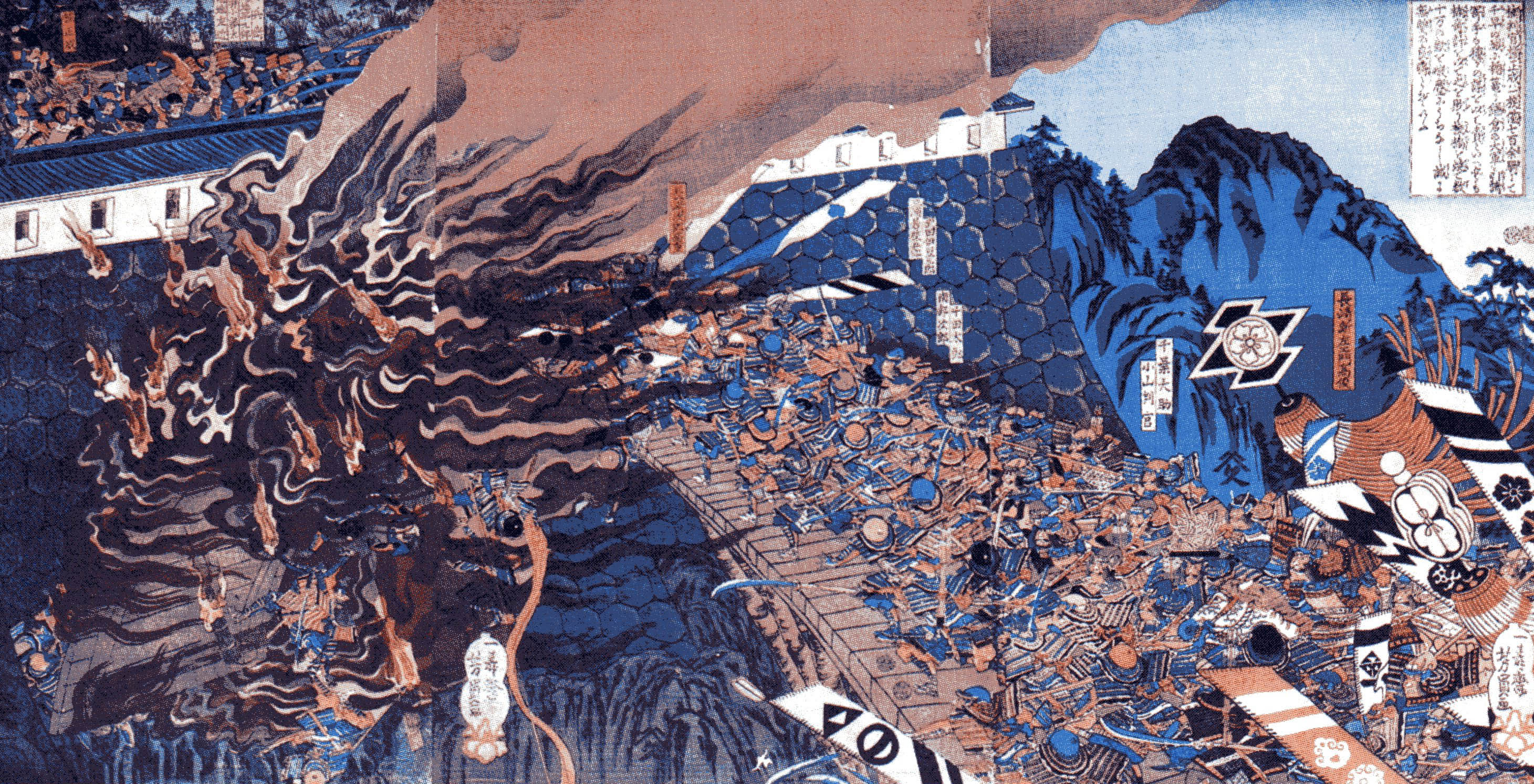
- Siege of Chihaya
Date	1333
Location	Chihaya castle, Mt. Kongō, Kawachi province 34°25′2.01″N 135°39′4.31″E
Result	Siege fails; Imperial victory

Belligerents
Imperial forces	Hōjō clan forces

Commanders and leaders
Kusunoki Masashige	Hōjō Aso; Hōjō Osaragi; Hōjō Nagoshi; Nitta Yoshisada

Strength
Less than 1,000	1 million or tens of thousands as per 14th-century sources
- Location within Japan

The 1333 siege of Chihaya took place during the final year of Japan's Kamakura period. It was one of several battles of the Genkō War, in which Emperor Go-Daigo sought to eliminate the power of the Hōjō clan regents.

== Background ==
Chihaya-jō (千早城, Chihaya fortress) was built atop Mt. Kongō, in Kawachi province, in 1332. Successfully defended the following year by the Imperial forces led by Kusunoki Masashige, it would eventually fall to the Ashikaga shogunate in 1390.

== Siege ==
Kusunoki Masashige's defense of this fortress became a very classic siege in Japanese history. This was because both the Imperial garrison and the besieging force of the Hōjō demonstrated high levels of siegecraft. Kusunoki's success here made up for his loss two years earlier at the siege of Akasaka, where surrender was forced by the denial of water supplies. Unlike at Akasaka, however, Kusunoki made sure that Chihaya could stand effectively against many attacks, which included the Hōjō's use of movable bridges and fire. Kusunoki also employed many strategies such as dummy troops, and surprise raids.

The fortress' position near the summit of the mountain further aided in its defense, allowing Kusunoki's inferior numbers to not be a hindrance in such limited space. His forces employed their superior knowledge of the ridges and ravines of the area to great effect, ending in a successful defense and the enemy's retreat once they learned of the collapse of the Hojo Rokuhara troops in Kyoto.
