= Kazuyuki =

- Gender: Male

Origin
- Origin: Japanese
- Meaning: Different meanings depending on the kanji used

Kazuyuki is a masculine Japanese given name. Notable people with the name include:

- Kazuyuki Akasaka (born 1989), Japanese baseball player
- Kazuyuki Atsuzawa (born 1972), Japanese retired baseball player
- Kazuyuki Fudeyasu (筆安一幸), Japanese screenwriter
- Kazuyuki Fujita (born 1970), Japanese professional wrestler, mixed martial artist and former amateur wrestler
- Kazuyuki Hoashi (born 1979), Japanese baseball pitcher
- Kazuyuki Iwamoto (岩本 和行; born 1946), Japanese swimmer
- Kazuyuki Izutsu (born 1952), Japanese film director, screenwriter and film critic
- Kazuyuki Kyoya (京谷 和幸; born 1971), Japanese footballer and wheelchair basketball player
- Kazuyuki Morisaki (born 1981), Japanese football player
- Kazuyuki Nakane (born 1969), Japanese politician
- Kazuyuki Okitsu (興津 和幸; born 1980), Japanese voice actor
- Kazuyuki Sogabe (1948–2006), Japanese voice actor
- Kazuyuki Toda (born 1977), Japanese football player
- Kazuyuki Yukawa (1949–2025), Japanese politician
