= Shimo-Akasaka Castle =

Japanese Kamakura-period castle

- 下赤坂城
- Chihayaakasaka, Osaka-fu, Japan
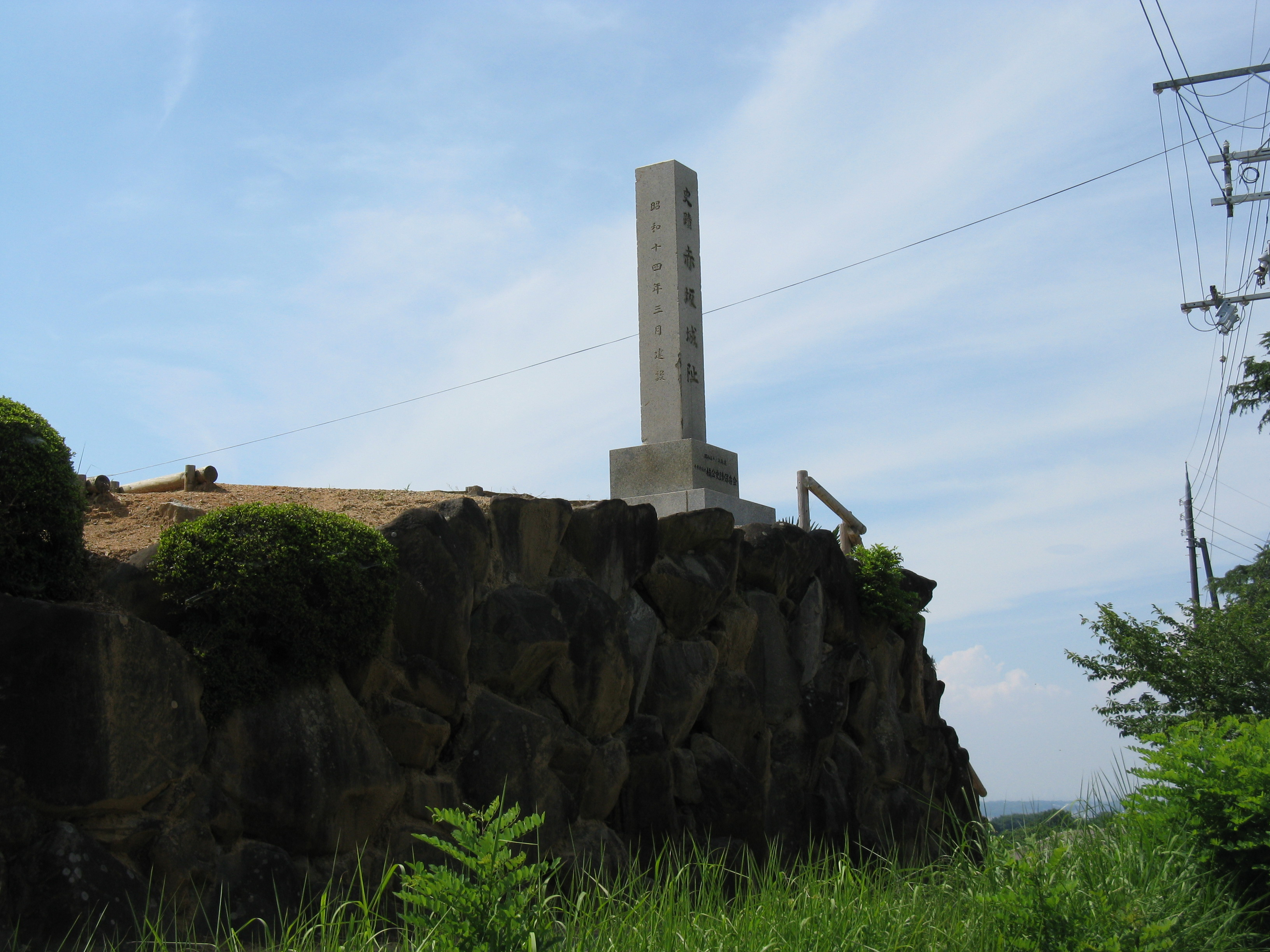
- Site of Shimo-Akasaka castle

Site information
- Type: Yamajiro-style Japanese castle
- Condition: ruins

Location
- Shimo-Akasaka Castle Shimo-Akasaka Castle (Japan)
- Coordinates: 34°27′35.0″N 135°37′7.0″E

Site history
- Built: 1331
- Built by: Kusunoki Masashige
- In use: 1331-1360
- Materials: Wood, stone
- National Historic Site of Japan

Shimo-Akasaka Castle (下赤坂城, Shimo-Akasaka-jō) is a late Kamakura period Japanese castle located in the village of Chihayaakasaka, Osaka Prefecture, Japan. Its ruins have been protected as a National Historic Site since 1934. It is also referred to as simply Akasaka Castle (赤坂城, Akasaka-jō).

== History ==
Shimo-Akasaka Castle is located on Mount Kabutori, a ridge extending from Mount Kongō on the border of Kawachi Province with the Yoshino region of Yamato Province at an elevation of 185.7 meters above sea level and 61.4 meters above its surroundings. It was part of a defensive position which included many smaller fortifications on surrounding hills, and later, Kami-Akasaka Castle on the hillside opposite a small river. The Honmaru (Main Enclosure) of Shimo-Akasaka Castle is now the site of the Chihayaakasaka Village Hall, and a monument indicating the location of the castle is within the grounds of the neighboring Chihayaakasaka Junior High School. In 1331, when Emperor Go-Daigo attempted to overthrow the Kamakura shogunate in the Genkō War, he relied on Prince Moriyoshi and a local lord from the Chihaya-Akasaka area, Kusunoki Masashige, to raise an army. However, this first attempt failed, and Emperor Go-Daigo was captured and exiled to the Oki Islands. Shogunal armies attacked Kusunoki Masashige at in the Siege of Akasaka and, when the castle fell, he faked his death and escaped into the deep mountains of his own territory where he constructed Kami-Akasaka Castle and Chihaya Castle. In early 1333, Kusunoki Masashige joined forces with Prince Moriyoshi and recovered Shimo-Akasaka Castle and resumed his offense against the shogunate.

After the Kenmu restoration, Shimo-Akasaka Castle continued to be used as a base for the Southern Court during the wars of the Nanboku-chō period, but fell to Northern Court forces in 1360. It is now largely ruins with little remaining evidence of the original structure.

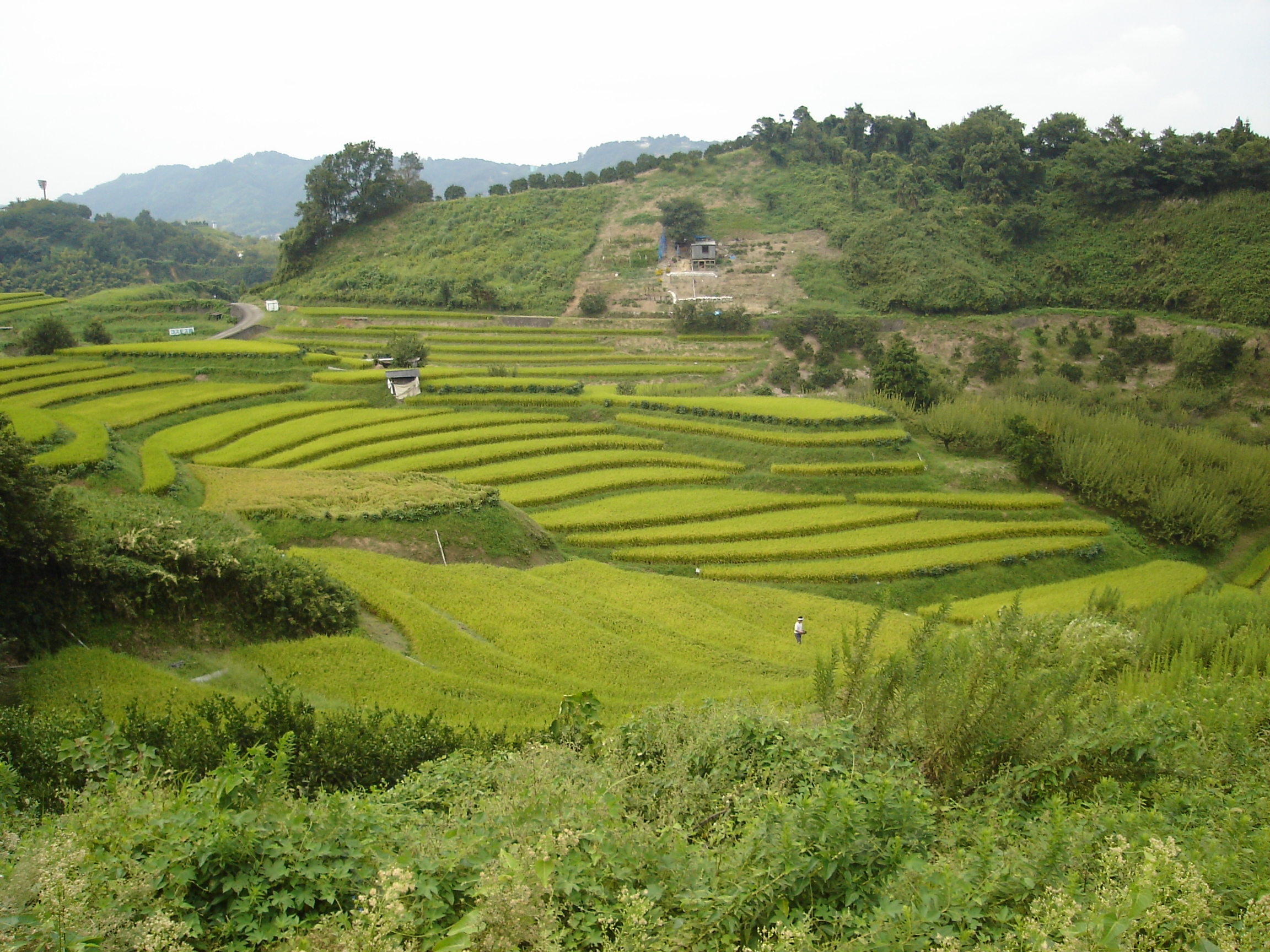
Rice Terraces near Shimo-Akasaka Castle

== See also ==
- List of Historic Sites of Japan (Osaka)
