= Eboshigata Castle =

Japanese Kamakura-period castle

- 烏帽子形城
- Kawachinagano, Osaka-fu, Japan
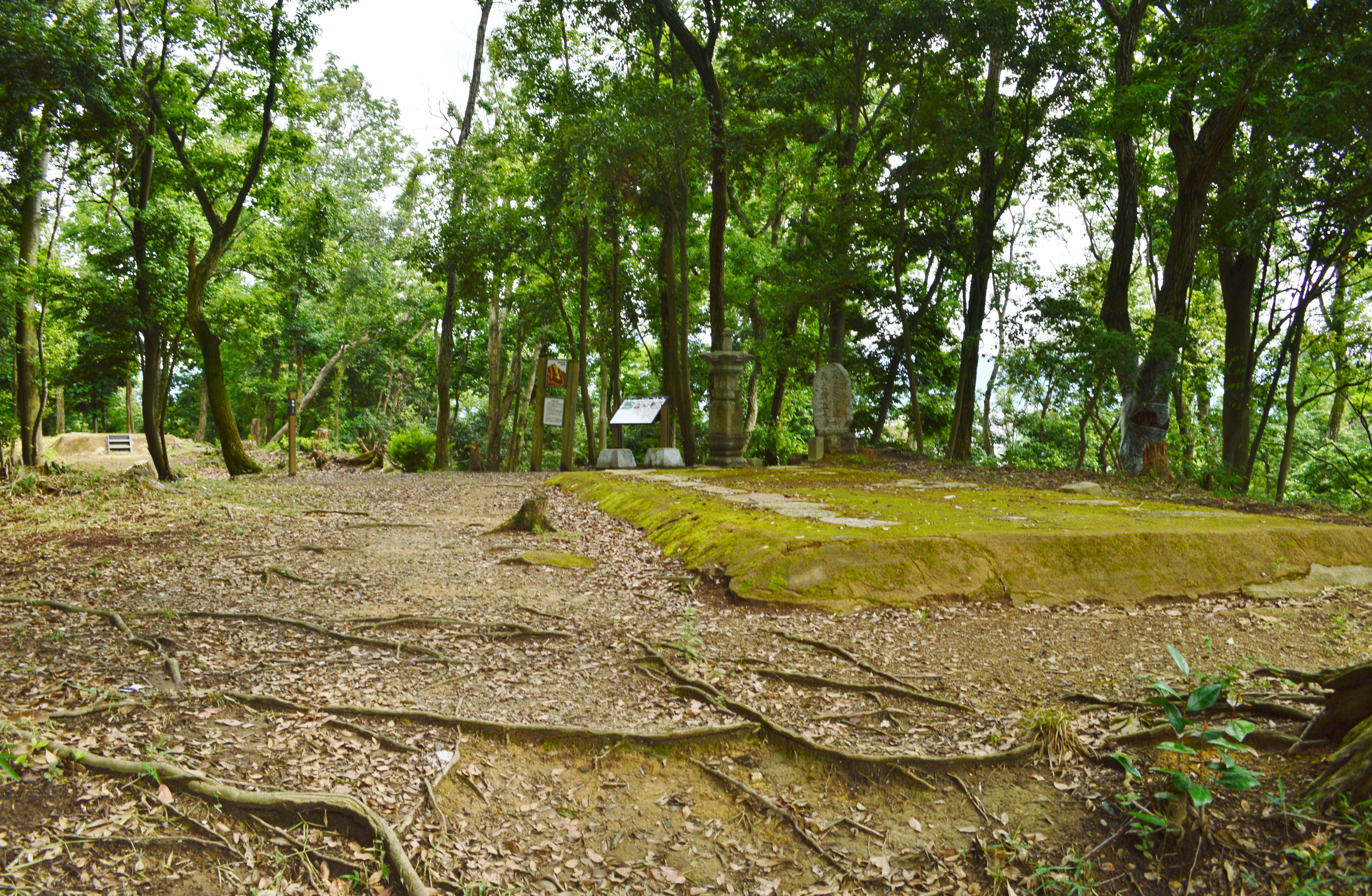
- Site of Eboshigata Castle

Site information
- Type: Yamajiro-style Japanese castle
- Condition: ruins

Location
- Eboshigata Castle Eboshigata Castle (Japan)
- Coordinates: 34°26′40.4″N 135°33′53″E

Site history
- Built: 1332
- Built by: Kusunoki Masashige
- In use: 1332-1617
- Materials: Wood, stone
- National Historic Site of Japan

Eboshigata Castle (烏帽子形城, Eboshigata-jō) is a late Kamakura period Japanese castle located in the city of Kawachinagano, Osaka Prefecture, Japan. Its ruins have been protected as a National Historic Site since 2012. It is also a site registered under Japan Heritage.

== History ==
Eboshigata Castle is one of the seven castles built by Kusunoki Masashige and is located at the top of Mount Eboshigata at an elevation of 182 meters. The site is protected by cliffs on the north and west, and by the Ishikawa River and Amami River to the south and east. Located on the Kōya Kaidō, it commanded a strategic position controlling the main route between Kyoto, Mount Kōya and the port of Sakai. The castle is relatively small, and measures approximately 180 meters from east to west and 150 meters from north to south. It consists of several enclosures on the mountain slope, protected by earthen walls and dry moats, with the only entrance being a steep and narrow path from the south. On the eastern slope of the mountain is the Eboshigata Hachiman-gu (built in 1480), and since most of the castle ruins are within the precincts of the shrine, the structure has been relatively well preserved.

The castle was completed in 1332 as an outlying fortification of Kusunoki Masashige's stronghold at Akasaka Castle; however, according to tradition, it is possible that this castle was the castle named "Nagano Castle" in the Heike Monogatari, which withstood a siege by Minamoto no Yukiie. During the Muromachi period, control of this castle was contested between the Hatakeyama clan, the Miyoshi clan and the Negoro-shū warrior-monks, with the castle changing hands several times. In 1575, the castle was laid waste by Oda Nobunaga during his conquest of the region; however, it was soon rebuilt by Kongō-ji as a base to control their properties in the area. However, per the Jesuit missionary Luís Fróis's "History of Japan" and "Jesuit Japan Annual Report", the castellan was a convert to Christianity, and was a base for many converts in the Minamikawachi region. In 1584, the castle was the base for Toyotomi Hideyoshi's conquest of Kii Province. In 1587, Christianity was prohibited and Christians were expelled from the area. The castle appears to have been abandoned completely by 1617 and fell into ruins.

The castle site is preserved as the Eboshigata Park, which also encompasses the Eboshigata Kofun, a 6th-century kofun burial mound. The castle ruins are about a 15-minute walk from Kawachinagano Station on the Nankai Electric Railway Kōya Line.

== Gallery ==
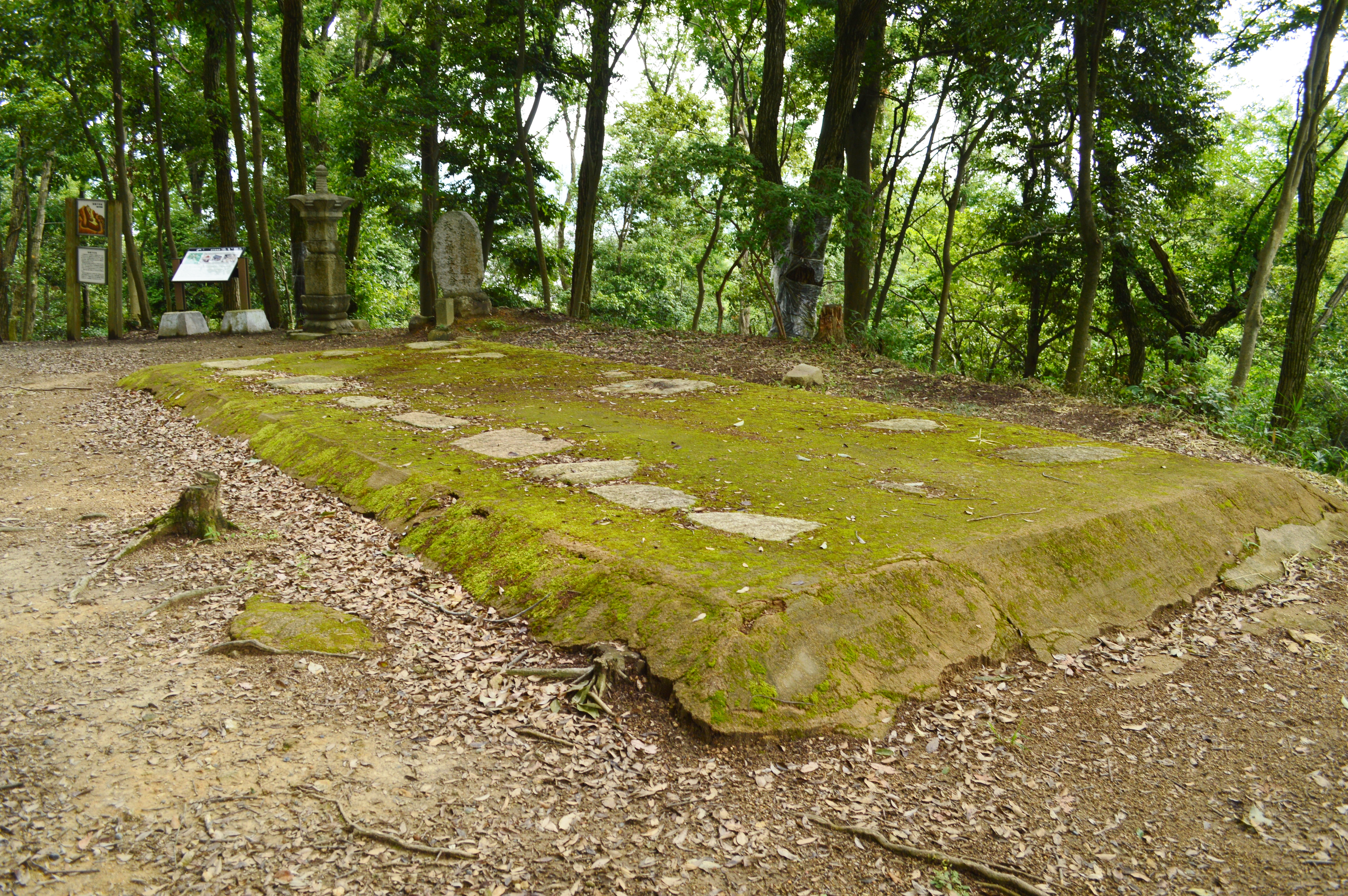
Foundations of a building in the Honmaru

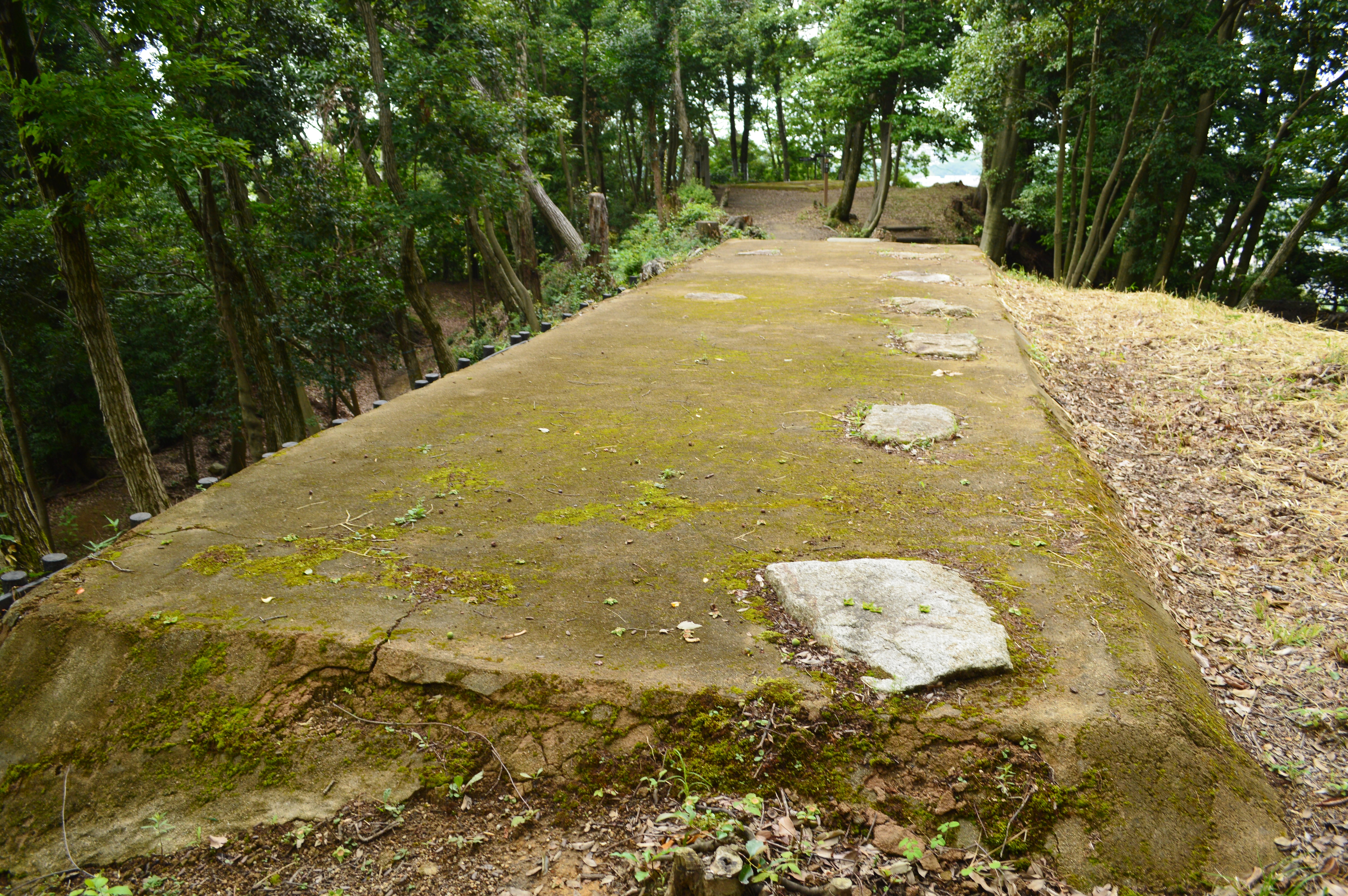
Foundations of a building in the Honmaru

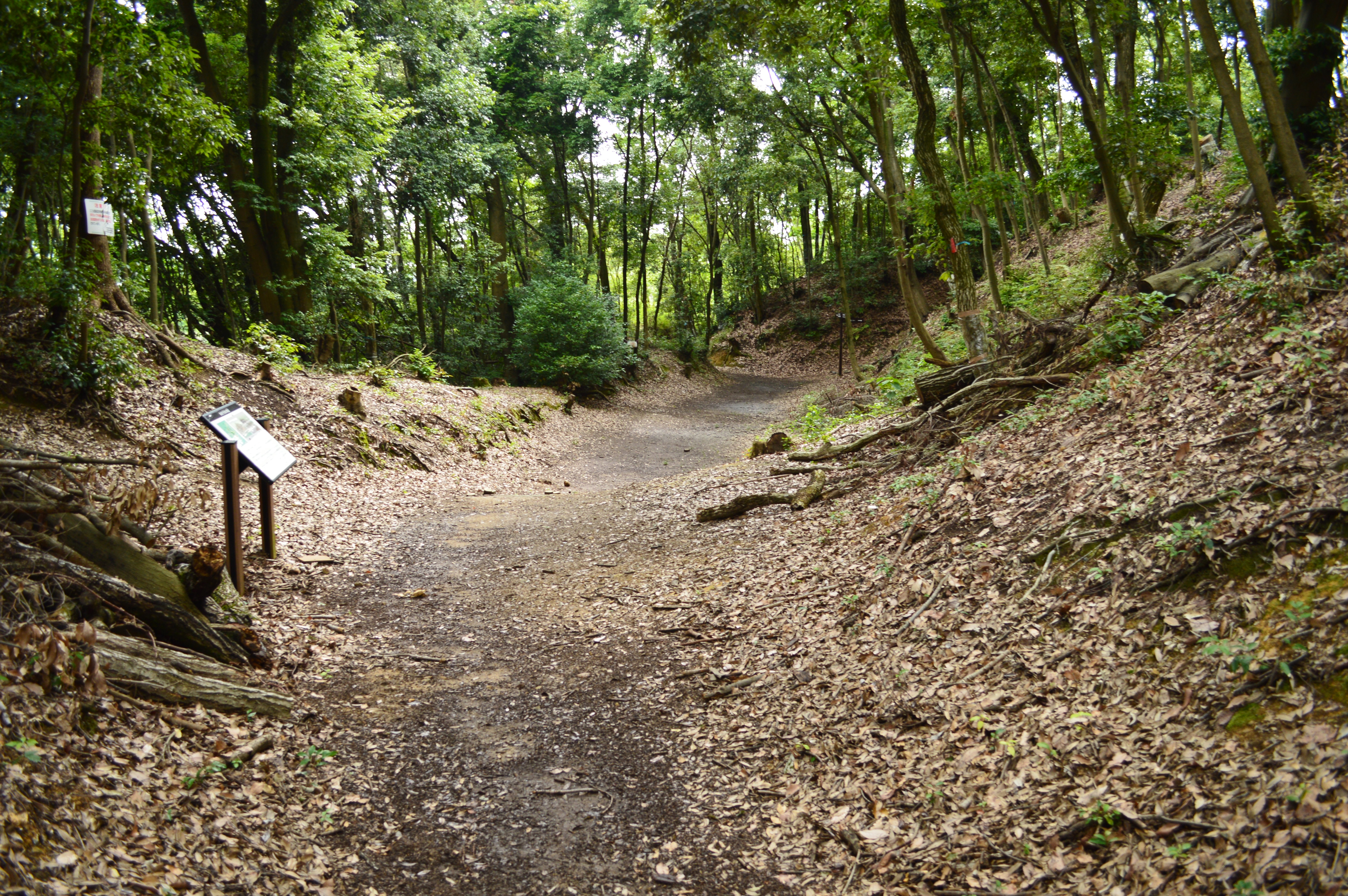
Moat

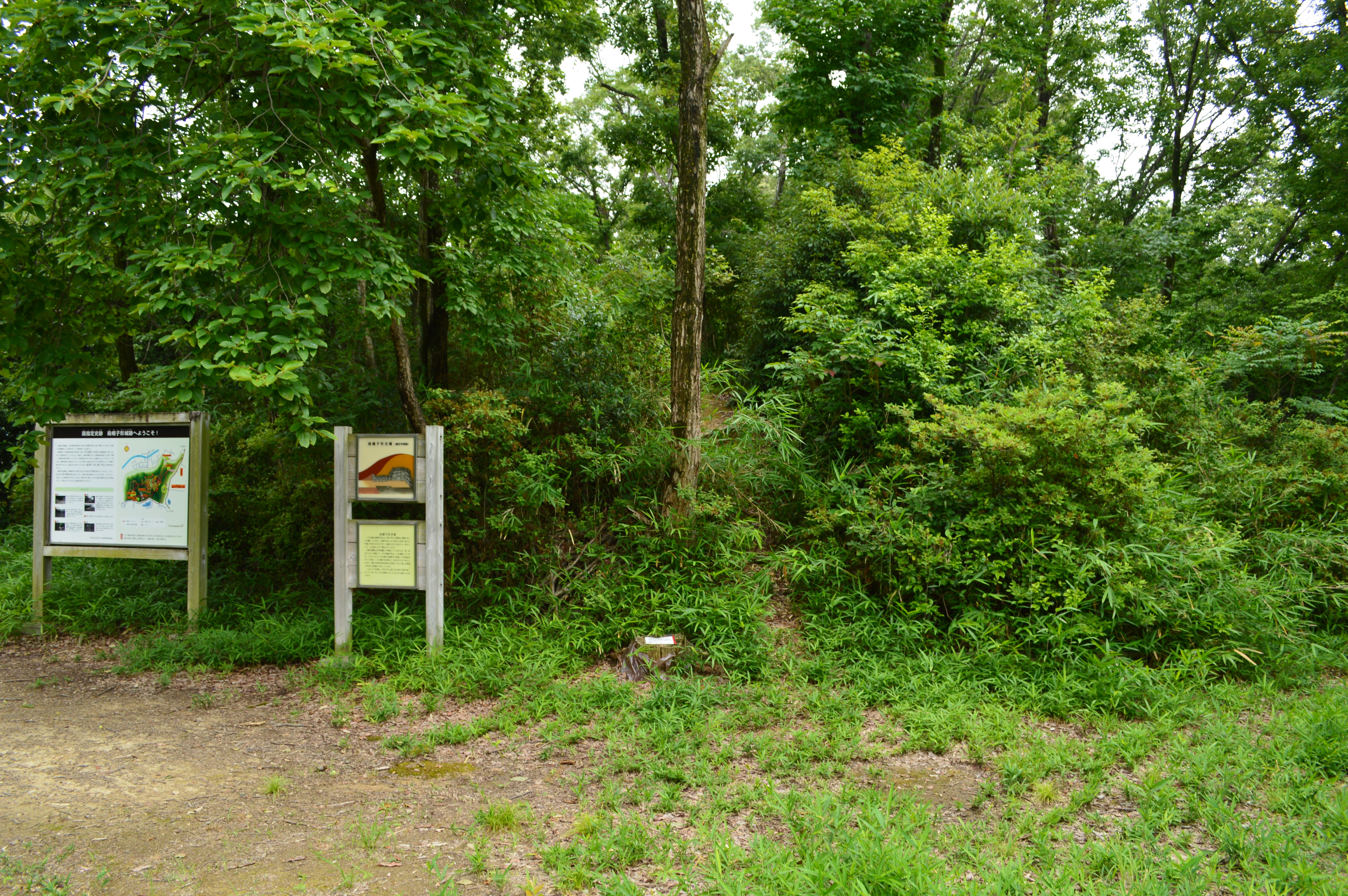
Eboshigata Kofun

== See also ==
- List of Historic Sites of Japan (Osaka)
