= Mount Kongo Ropeway =

Aerial tramway in Osaka, Japan

Coordinates: 34°24′45.6″N 135°40′32.3″E

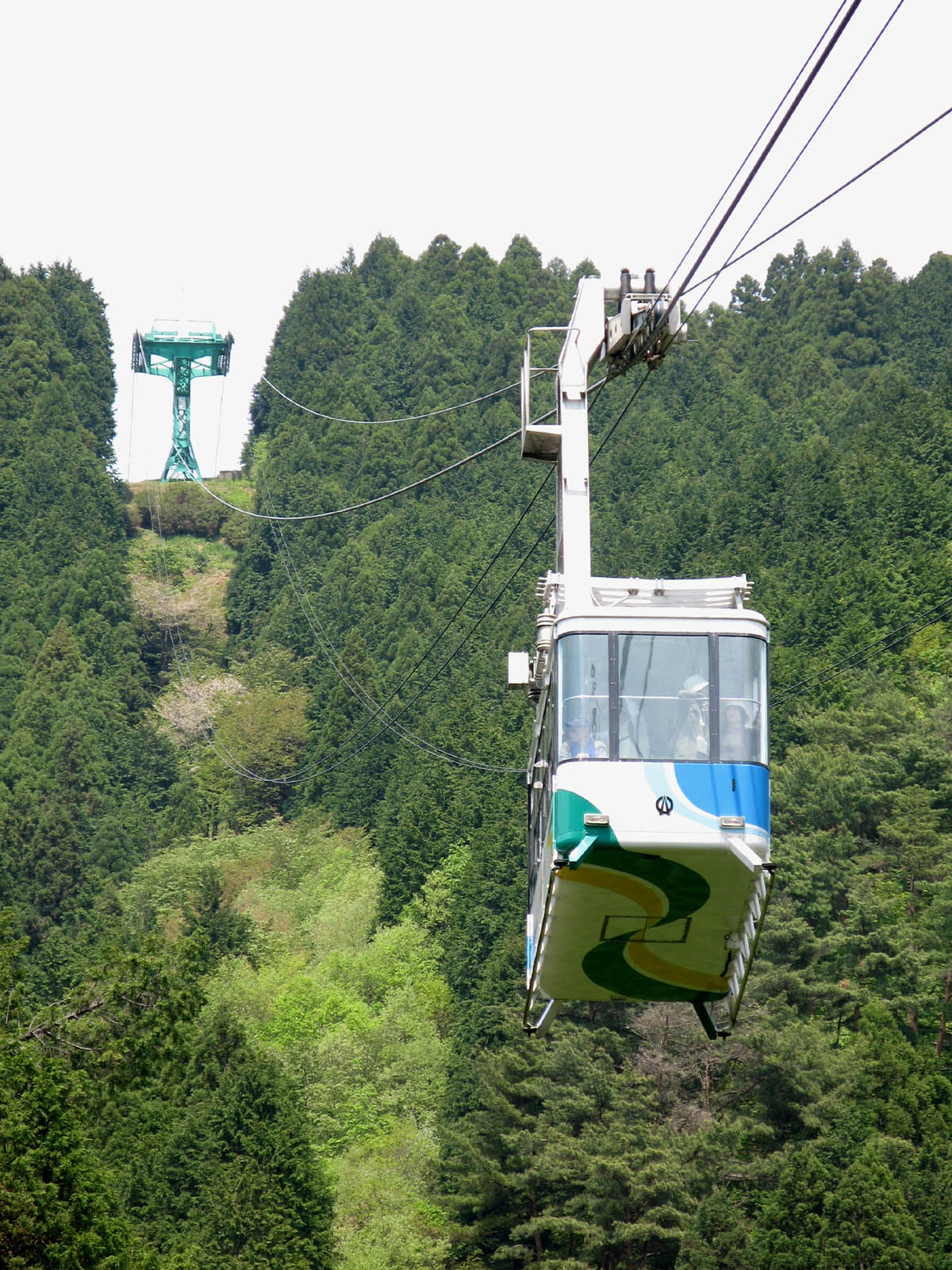
- Interactive map of Mount Kongo Ropeway

Overview
- Status: Closed
- Character: Aerial tramway
- Location: Mount Kongō, Chihayaakasaka, Ōsaka, Japan
- Termini: Chihaya Station; Kongosan Station
- No. of stations: 2
- Open: April 17, 1966
- Closed: September 16, 2022

Operation
- Owner: Chihayaakasaka Village
- Carrier capacity: 46 Passengers per cabin, 2 cabins
- Trip duration: 6 min

Technical features
- Line length: 1,323 metres (0.8 mi)
- Operating speed: 5 m/s
- Vertical Interval: 267 m (876 ft)

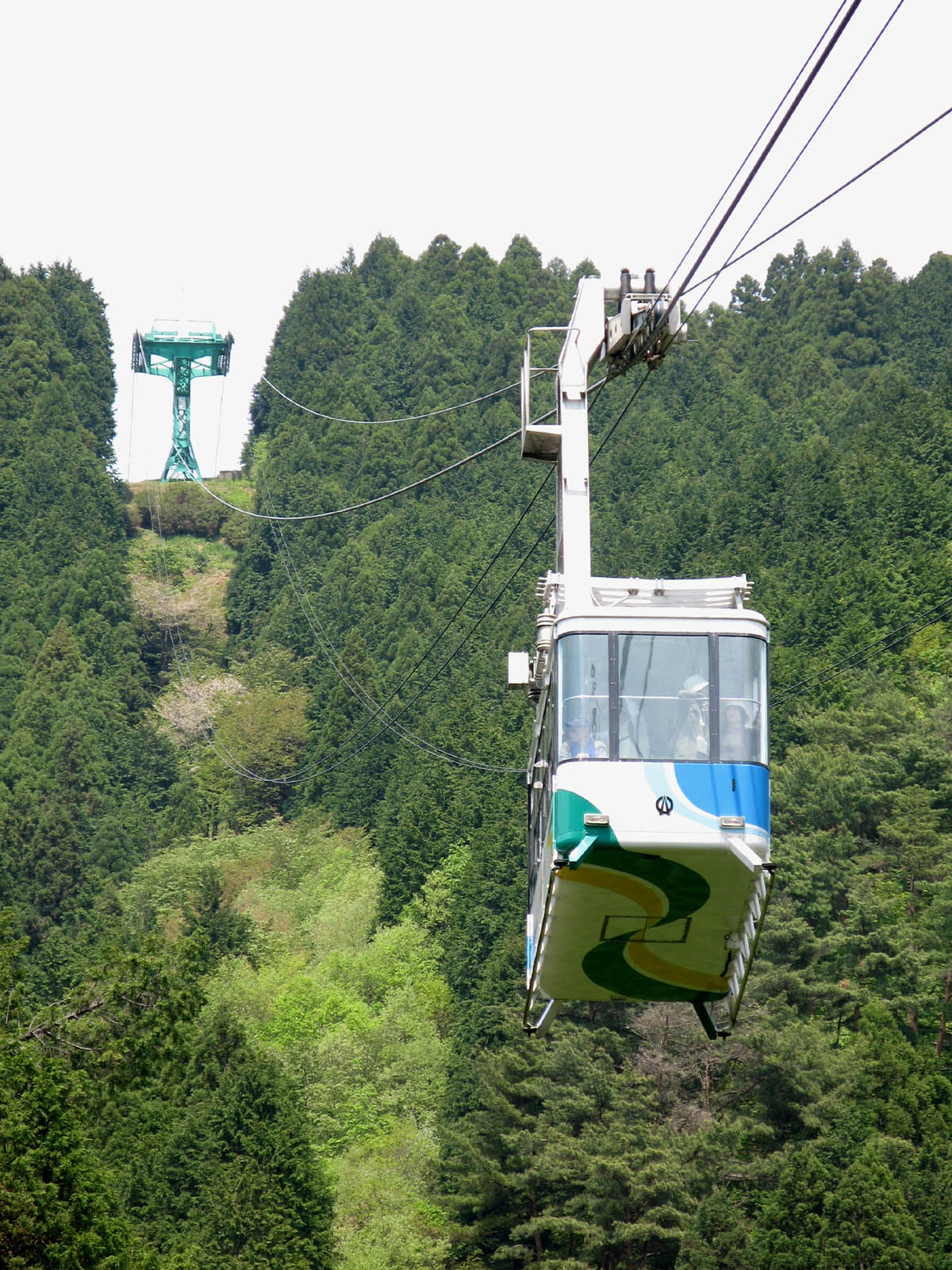
Mt. Kongō Ropeway.

The Mt. Kongō Ropeway (金剛山ロープウェイ, Kongōsan Rōpuwei) was a Japanese aerial lift line in Chihayaakasaka, Ōsaka. The line is unique as it is owned by the Chihayaakasaka Village government, and was the only village-run ropeway in Japan. The line was operated by the village itself until April 1, 2004, when operation was entrusted to Gourmet Kineya (グルメ杵屋), a private company that mainly operates restaurants. Opened on April 17, 1966, the line climbs Mount Kongō, the highest point of Ōsaka.

Following the 2018 Osaka earthquake, an earthquake resistance inspection of ropeway facilities found that both stations had insufficient earthquake resistance. As a result, operation of the ropeway was suspended March 15, 2019.

In February 2021, due to the high cost of earthquake reinforcement works required as well as updating the electrical equipment (which had not been updated since the ropeway opened), Chihayaakasaka Village decided to cease operation of the Mount Kongo Ropeway and consider transferring it to a private operator if one could be found.

On September 16, 2022, Chihayaakasaka Village announced that no private purchaser had been found and that the ropeway will be discontinued and demolition will commence.

As of October 2024, demolition of the associated Konanso accommodation facility (also owned by Chihayaakasaka Village) had commenced, but demolition of the ropeway infrastructure had not yet commenced.

== Basic data ==
- Commenced operation: April 17, 1966
- Distance: 1,323 metres (0.8 miles)
- Vertical interval: 267 metres (876 feet)
- Operation suspended: March 15, 2019

The total number of passengers carried over the life of the ropeway was approximately 8.4 million (annual average: 158,000 people).

== See also ==
- List of aerial lifts in Japan
