= Kongō-Ikoma-Kisen Quasi-National Park =

National park in Japan

- 金剛生駒紀泉国定公園
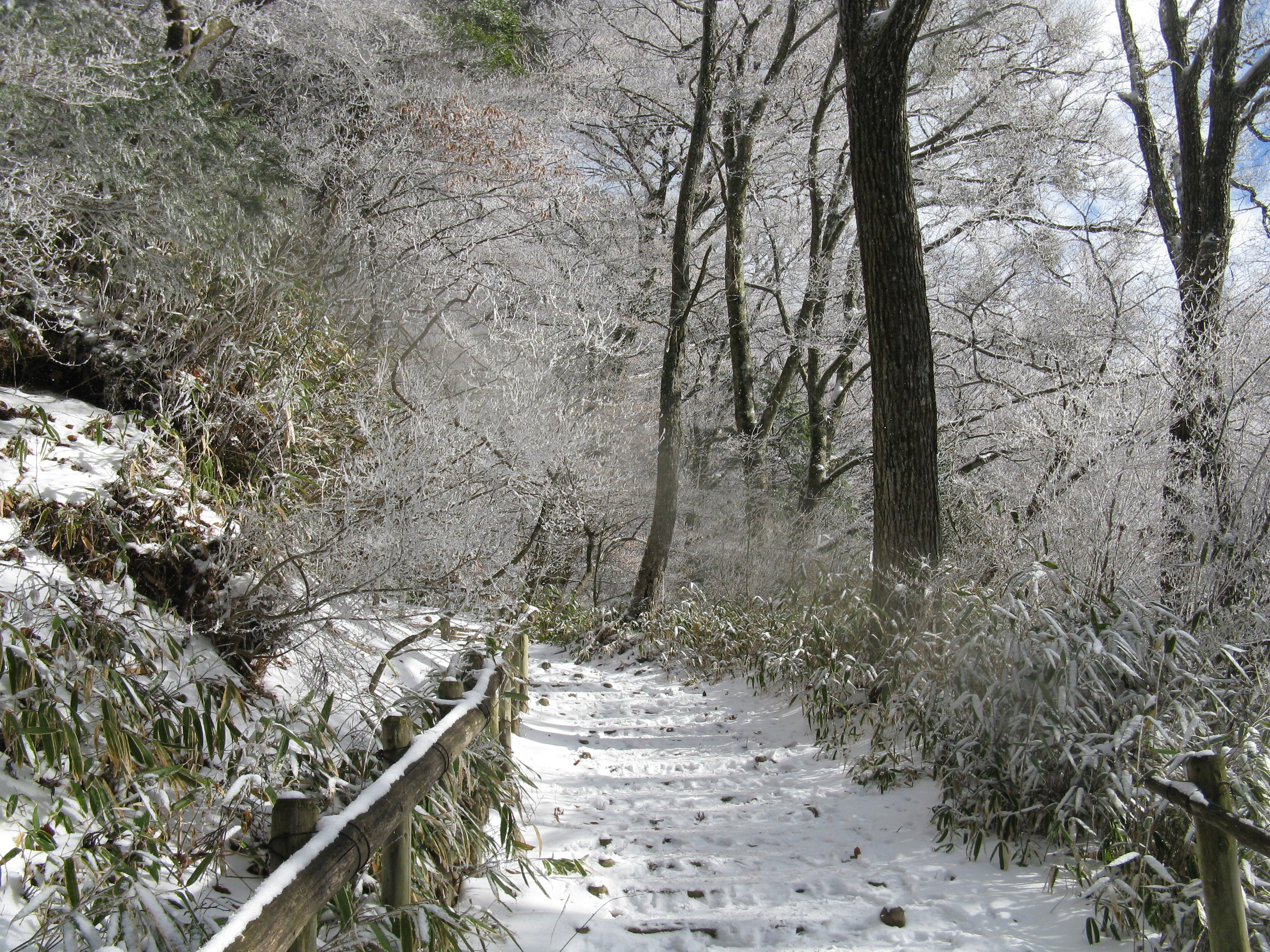
- Mount Kongō

- Location within Japan
- Location: Kansai, Japan
- Coordinates: 34°27′40″N 135°41′35″E
- Area: 231.19 km^{2} (89.26 sq mi)
- Established: 10 April 1958

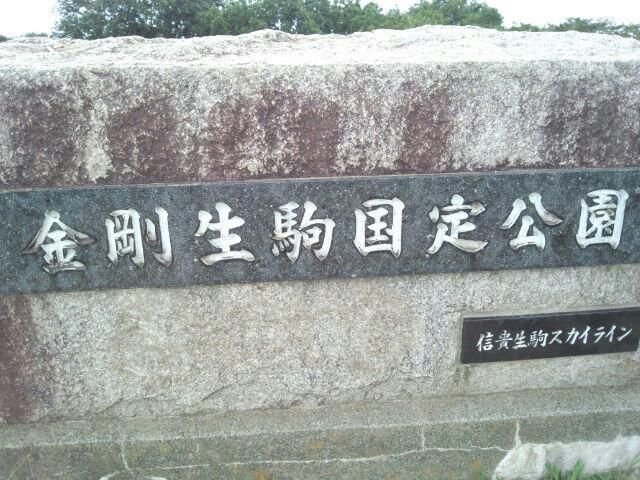
This is the monument which indicate this place is Kongō-Ikoma-Kisen Quasi-National Park.

Kongō-Ikoma-Kisen Quasi-National Park (金剛生駒紀泉国定公園, Kongō-Ikoma-Kisen Kokutei Kōen) is a Quasi-National Park in Nara, Ōsaka, and Wakayama Prefectures, Japan. It was established in 1958.

== Places of interest ==
Places of interest include:

- Mount Ikoma
- Mount Kongō
- Shijōnawate Jinja (四條畷神社)
- Chōgosonshi-ji (朝護孫子寺)
- Hōzan-ji
- Taima-dera
- Kongō-ji (金剛寺)
- the burial place of Shōtoku Taishi
- the ruins of Akasaka Castle (赤坂城)
- Chihaya Castle
- Katsuragi 28 Shuku

== Related municipalities ==
- Nara: Gojō, Gose, Heguri, Ikoma, Kashiba, Katsuragi, Sangō
- Ōsaka: Izumi, Izumisano, Kaizuka, Kawachinagano, Kishiwada, Sennan (incomplete)
- Wakayama: Hashimoto, Katsuragi, Kinokawa

== See also ==
- List of national parks of Japan
