= Kami-Akasaka Castle =

Japanese Kamakura-period castle

- 上赤坂城
- Chihayaakasaka, Osaka-fu, Japan
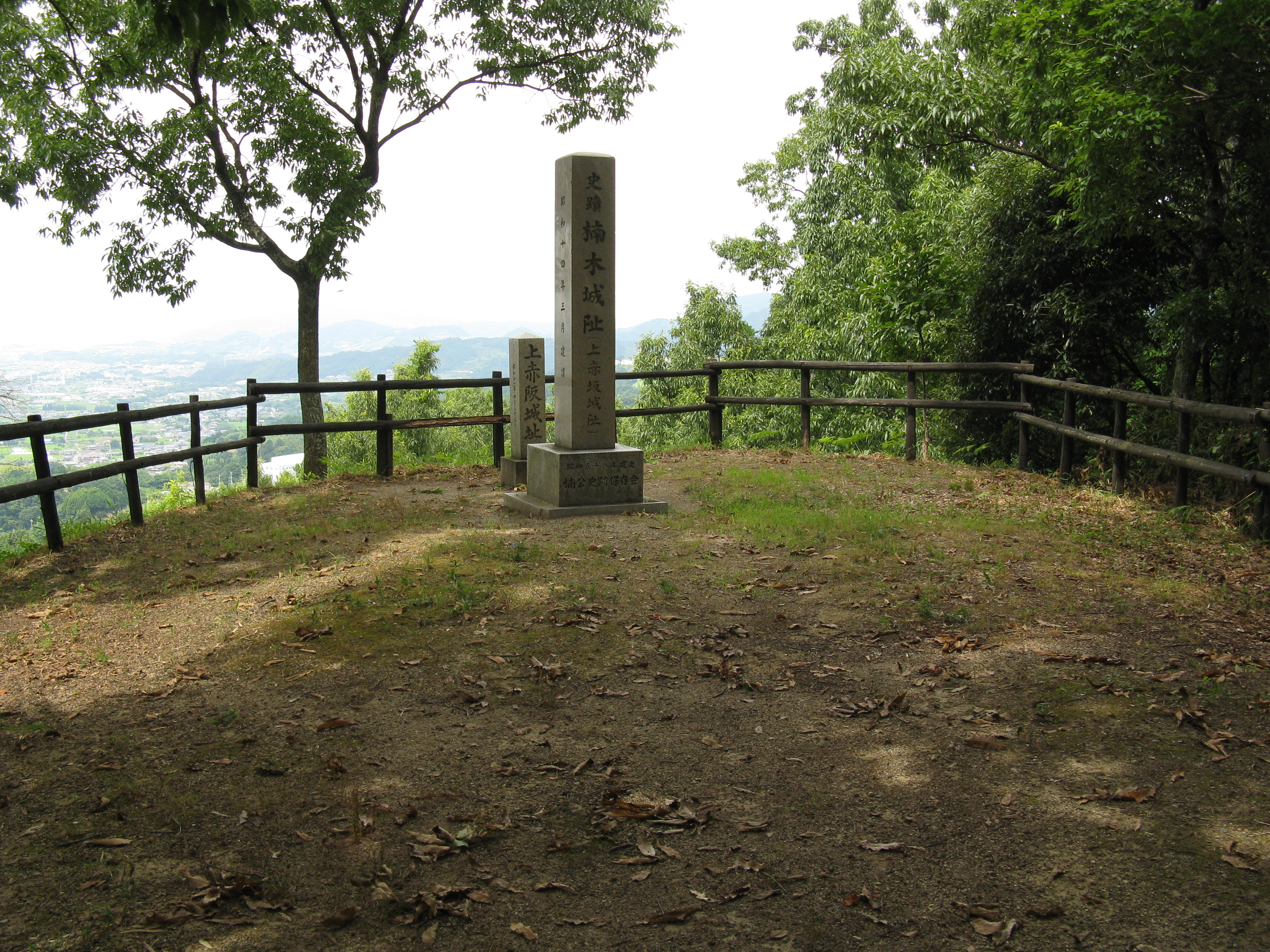
- Site of Kami-Akasaka castle

Site information
- Type: Yamajiro-style Japanese castle
- Condition: ruins

Location
- Kami-Akasaka castle Castle Kami-Akasaka Castle (Japan)
- Coordinates: 34°26′52.8″N 135°37′50.9″E

Site history
- Built: 1331
- Built by: Kusunoki Masashige
- In use: 1331-1360
- Materials: Wood, stone
- National Historic Site of Japan

Kami-Akasaka Castle (上赤坂城, Kami-Akasaka-jō) is a late Kamakura period Japanese castle located in the village of Chihayaakasaka, Osaka Prefecture, Japan. Its ruins have been protected as a National Historic Site since 1934. It is also referred to as Kusunoki Castle (楠木城, Kusunoki-jō) or Kiriyama Castle (桐山城, Kiriyama-jō),

== History ==
Kami-Akasaka Castle is located at a ridge extending from Mount Kongō on the border of Kawachi Province with the Yoshino region of Yamato Province. It was the center of a defensive position which included many smaller fortifications on surrounding hills. Shimo-Akasaka Castle is located at a lower level opposite a small river. In 1331, when Emperor Go-Daigo attempted to overthrow the Kamakura shogunate in the Genkō War, he relied on Prince Moriyoshi and a local lord from the Chihaya-Akasaka area, Kusunoki Masashige to raise an army. However, this first attempt failed, and Emperor Go-Daigo was captured and exiled to the Oki Islands and Kusunoki Masashige faked his death at the Siege of Akasaka and escaped into the deep mountains of his own territory where he constructed Kami-Akasaka Castle and Chihaya Castle.

The castle was consisted of several enclosures protected by dry moats, spread over the mountain and formed a letter "H" connecting two peaks and the intervening saddle. From the entry to the inner enclosures was a narrow path with several gates. In early 1333, Kusunoki Masashige joined forces with Prince Moriyoshi and recovered Shimo-Akasaka Castle and resumed his offense against the shogunate. The shogunate responded with a large army which laid siege to Kami-Akasaka Castle, which was defended by Kusunoki Masashige's brother Kusunoki Masasue. The castle fell after two weeks, once the shogunate army had managed to break the water supply to the defenders.

After the Kenmu restoration, Kami-Akasaka Castle continued to be used as a base for the Southern Court during the wars of the Nanboku-chō period, but fell to Northern Court forces in 1360. It is now largely ruins with little remaining evidence of the original structure.

== Gallery ==
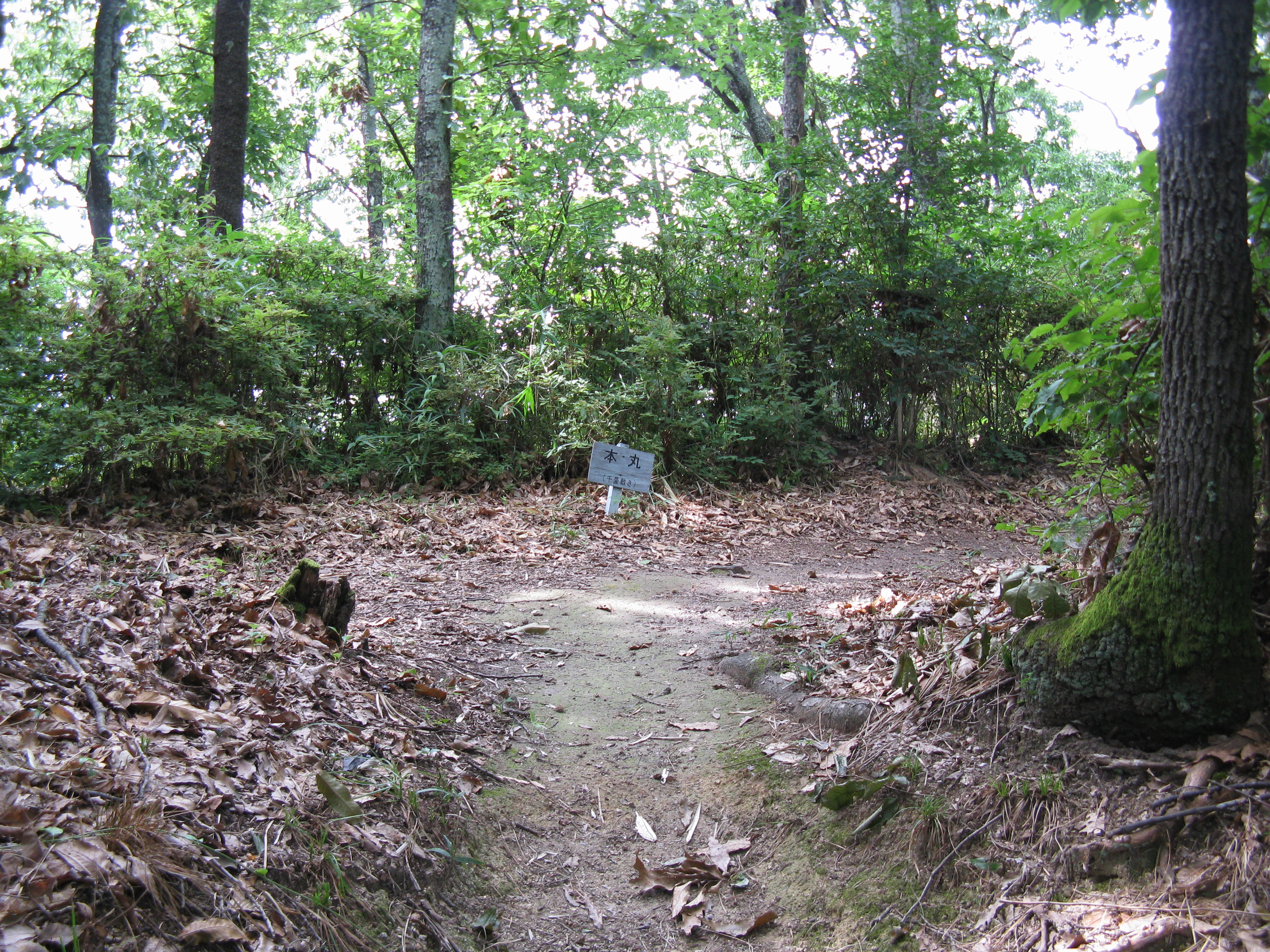
Site of Honmaru

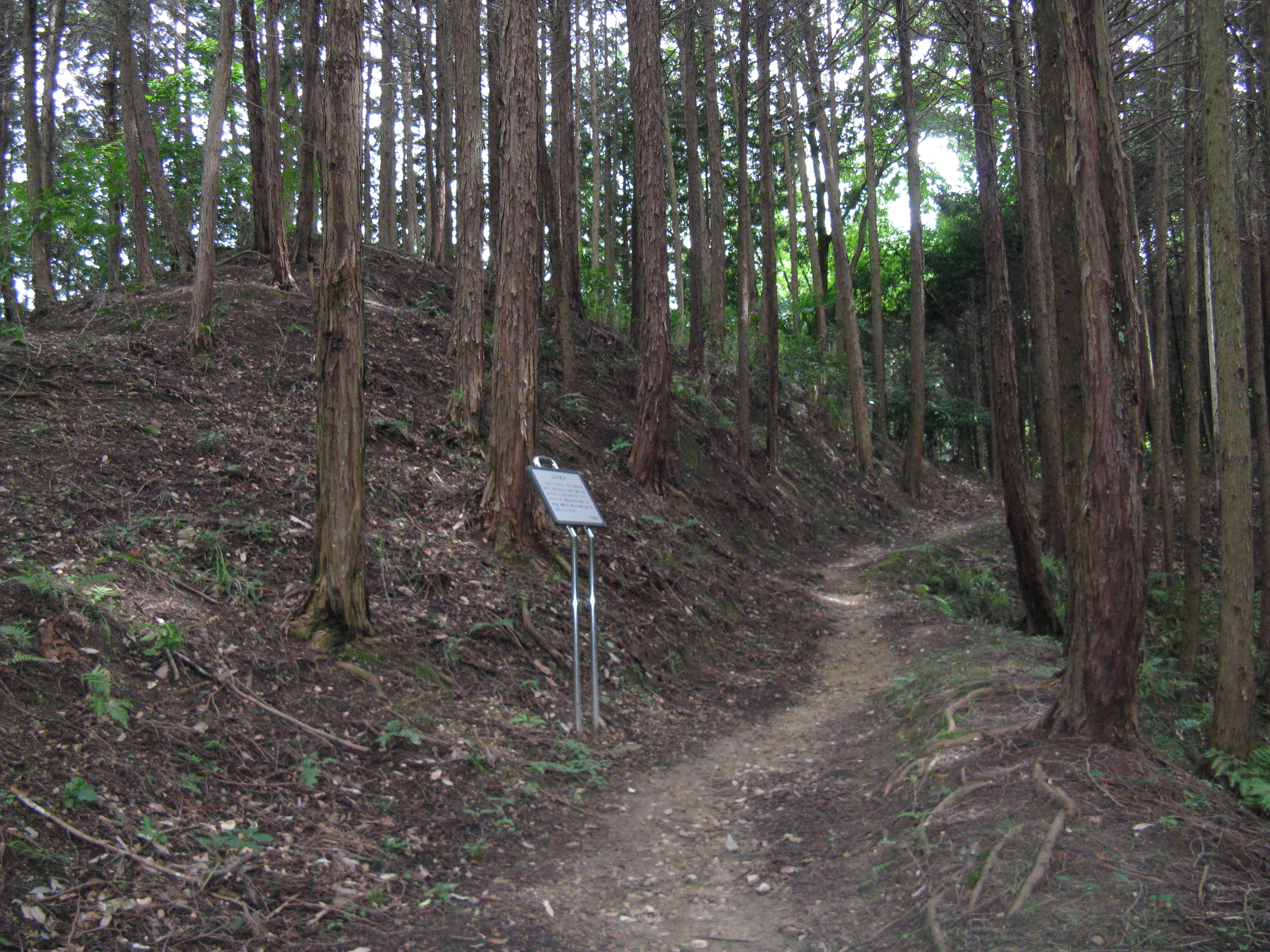
Ni-no-kido

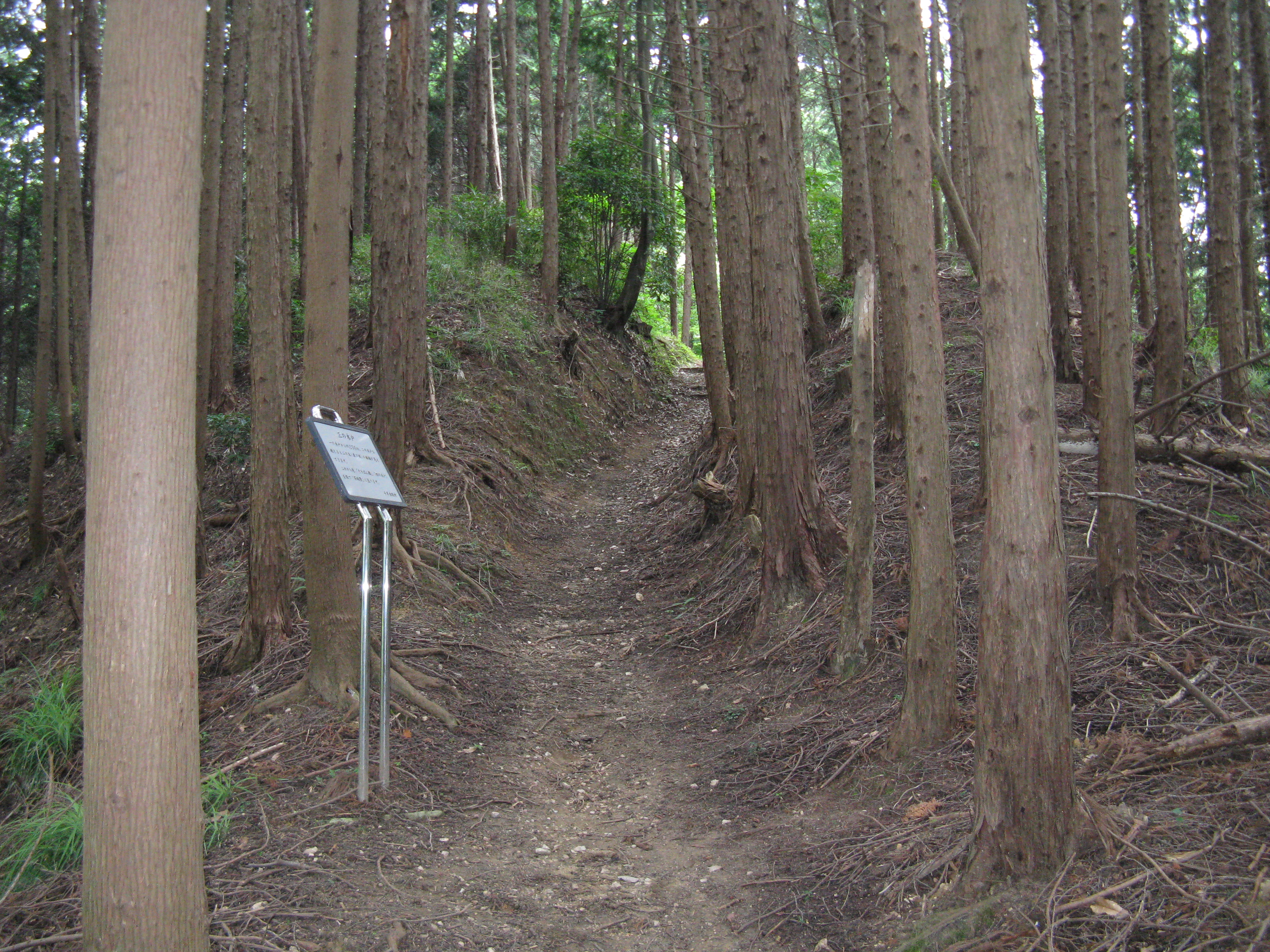
San-no-kido

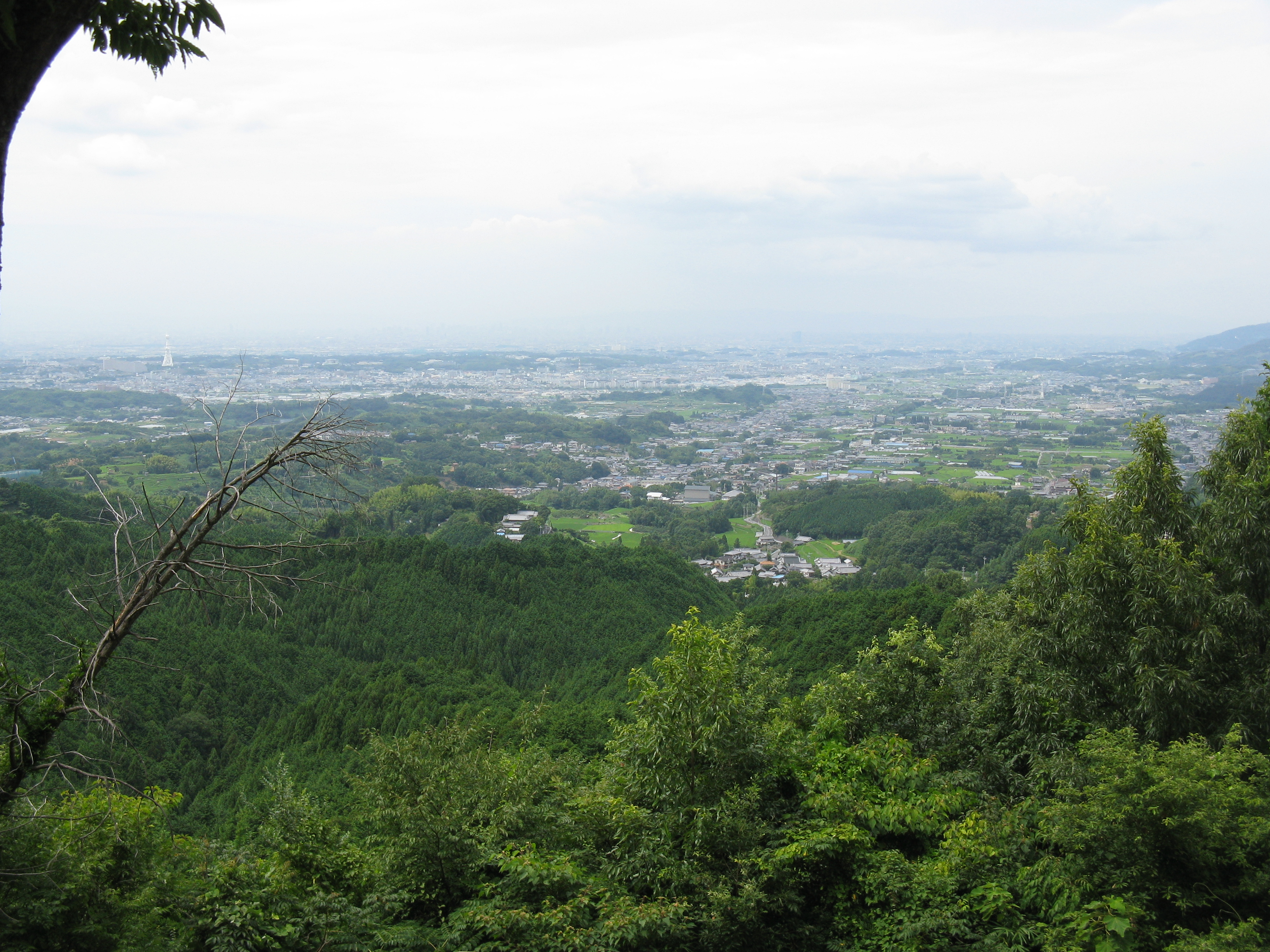
View from the castle

== See also ==
- List of Historic Sites of Japan (Osaka)
