= Akasa =

Akasa may refer to:

== Philosophy ==
- Ākāśa, a concept in Indian cosmology
- Ākāśa (Jainism), space in the Jain conception of the cosmos

== People and persons ==
- Akasa Singh, Indian singer
- Akassa tribe (also called Akasa) from Nigeria

== Places ==
- Akasa District (赤佐地区), Hamana Ward, Hamamatsu, Shizuoka Prefecture, Japan
- Akasa Linea, 486958 Arrokoth, Kuiper Belt, Solar System; the neck of Arrokoth

== Groups and organizations ==
- Akasa (band), a British music band
- Akasa Air, Indian low-cost airline based in Mumbai

== Other uses ==
- Udara akasa (U. akasa), a butterfly from India

== See also ==
- Acasa
- Akasha (disambiguation)
- Akasaka (disambiguation)
