= Akasaka (surname) =

Akasaka (written: 赤阪 or 赤坂 lit. "red hill") is a Japanese surname. Notable people with the surname include:

- Aka Akasaka (赤坂 アカ, born 1988), Japanese manga artist
- Kazuyuki Akasaka (赤坂 和幸, born 1989), Japanese baseball player
- Kiyotaka Akasaka (赤阪 清隆, born 1948), Japanese diplomat
- Mac Akasaka (マック 赤坂, born 1948), Japanese activist
- Mari Akasaka (赤坂 真理, born 1964), Japanese writer
- Takako Akasaka (赤阪 尊子, born 1955), Japanese competitive eater
- Yuichi Akasaka (赤坂 雄一, born 1967), Japanese speed skater
