= Chihayaakasaka =

Place in Osaka Prefecture, Japan

Chihayaakasaka 千早赤阪村
- Village
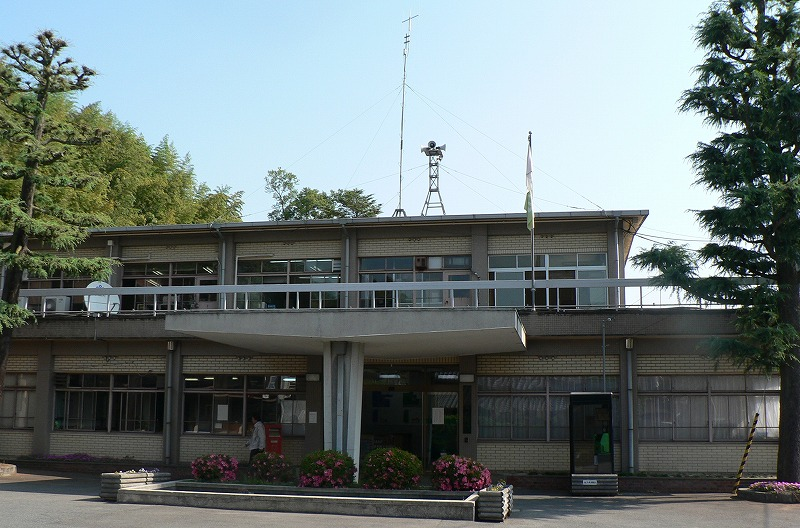
- Chihayakasaka Village Hall

- Flag Emblem

- Location of Chihayaakasaka in Osaka Prefecture

- Location in Japan
- Coordinates: 34°28′N 135°37′E
- Country: Japan
- Region: Kansai; Kinki
- Prefecture: Osaka
- District: Minamikawachi

Area
  - Total: 37.30 km^{2} (14.40 sq mi)

Population (31 December 2021)
  - Total: 4,970
  - Density: 133/km^{2} (345/sq mi)
- Time zone: UTC+09:00 (JST)
- City hall address: 180 Chihayaakasaka-mura, Minamikawachi-gun, Osaka-fu 585-8501
- Website: Official website
- Symbols
- Flower: Lilium auratum
- Tree: Camphor laurel

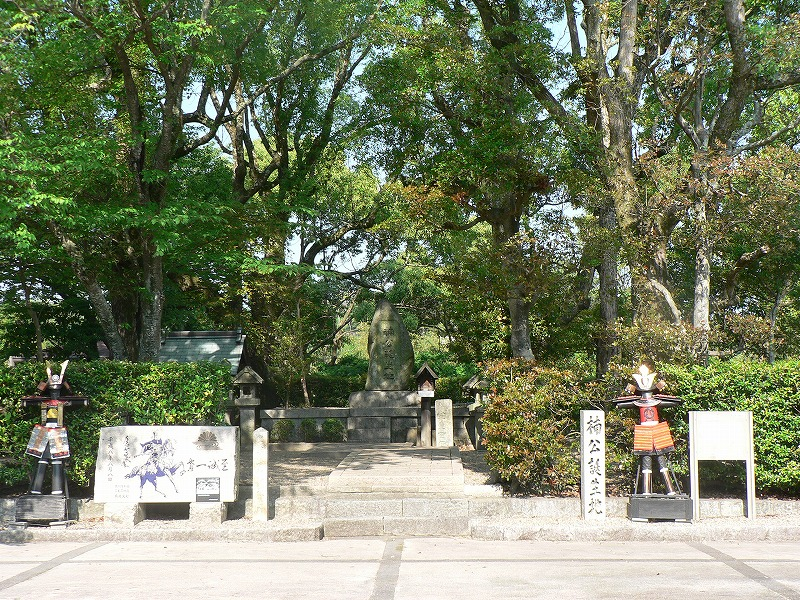
Kusunoki Masashige's birthplace

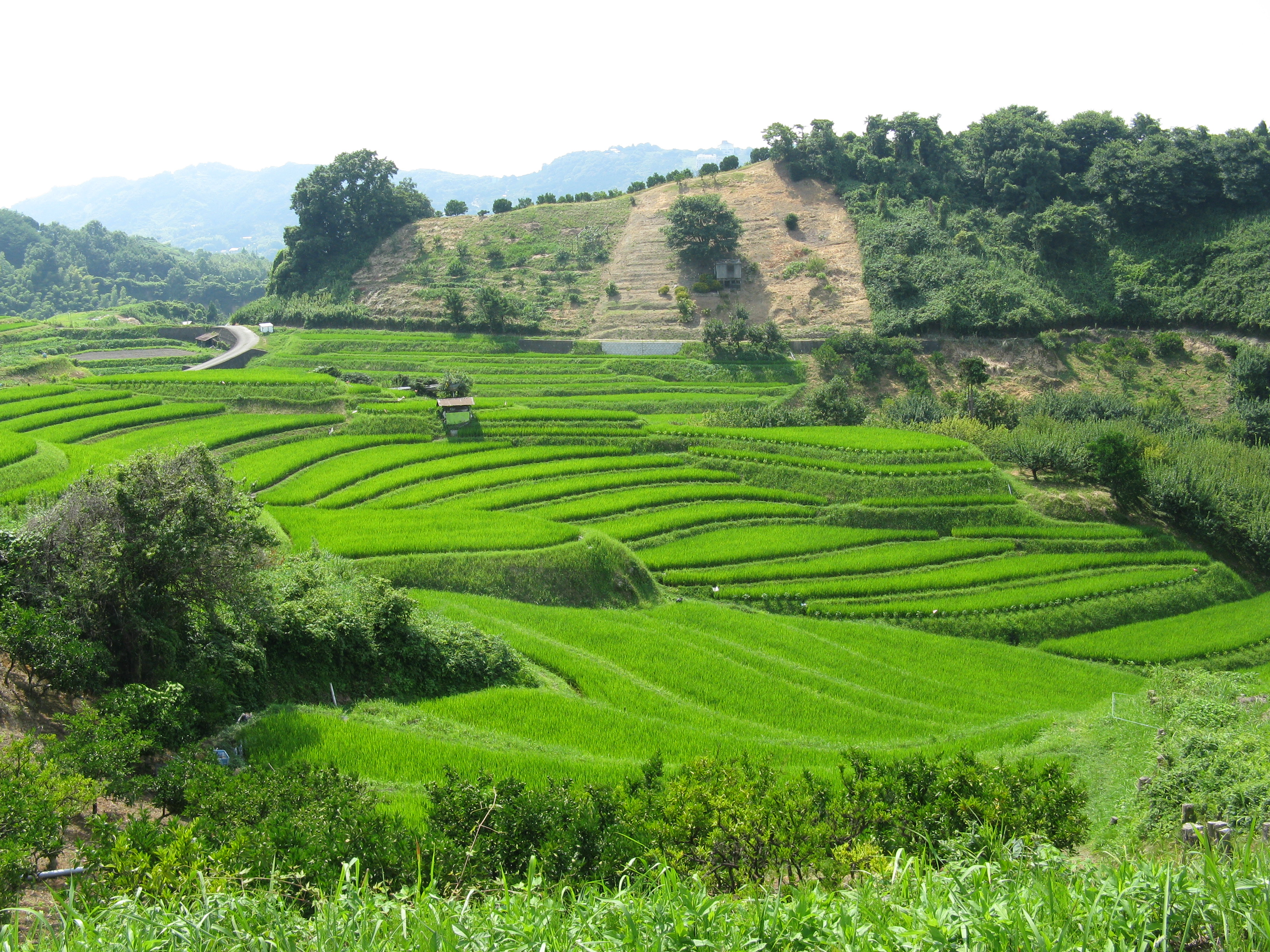
Rice Terraces near Shimo-Akasaka Castle

Chihayaakasaka (千早赤阪村, Chihayaakasaka-mura) is a village located in Minamikawachi District, Osaka Prefecture, Japan. As of 31 December 2021, the village had an estimated population of 4,970 in 2267 households and a population density of 130 persons per km^{2}. The total area of the village is 30.70 square kilometres (11.85 sq mi).

== Geography ==
Chihayaakasaka is located in the far southeast corner of Osaka Prefecture, bordered by the Yoshino region of Nara to the east. Most of the village area is mountainous and forested, and is within the borders of the Kongō-Ikoma-Kisen Quasi-National Park.

== Climate ==
Chihayaakasaka has a humid subtropical climate (Köppen Cfa) characterized by warm summers and cool winters with light to no snowfall. The average annual temperature in Chihayaakasaka is 13.9 °C. The average annual rainfall is 1636 mm with September as the wettest month. The temperatures are highest on average in August, at around 26.0 °C, and lowest in January, at around 2.4 °C.

=== Neighboring municipalities ===
Nara Prefecture

- Gojō
- Gose

Osaka Prefecture

- Kanan
- Kawachinagano
- Tondabayashi

== Demographics ==
Per census data, the population of Chihayaakasaka peaked in the 1990s and has been declining since.

Historical population
Year	Pop.	±%
1920	4,449	—
1930	4,500	+1.1%
1940	4,605	+2.3%
1950	5,720	+24.2%
1960	5,283	−7.6%
1970	5,013	−5.1%
1980	7,288	+45.4%
1990	7,617	+4.5%
2000	6,968	−8.5%
2010	6,015	−13.7%

== History ==
The area of the modern village of Chihayaakasaka was within ancient Kawachi Province, and became famous in the late Kamakura and Nanboku-chō periods as the home territory of the imperial loyalist, Kusunoki Masashige. Various fortifications from that period, notably Shimo-Akasaka Castle, Kami-Akasaka Castle and Chihaya Castle on the slopes of Mount Kongo were the sites of important battles in the 14th century. The villages of Chihaya and Akasaka were established within Ishikawa District with the creation of the modern municipalities system on 1 April 1889. On 1 April 1896 the area became part of Minamikawachi District, Osaka. The two villages merged on 30 September 1956 to form the village of Chihayaakasaka.

On 25 May 1893, eleven people were killed in series of sword attacks in the Suibun area of Akasaka over an infidelity and extortion-centered family feud. The murders became a major influence on Kawachi ondo works.

On 1 March 2008 Chihayaakasaka requested a merge into the adjacent city of Kawachinagano, after talks of merging with the surrounding towns of Kanan and Taishi fell through. These plans were also rejected due to strong public opposition on 14 August 2009.

== Government ==
Chihayaakasaka has a mayor-council form of government with a directly elected mayor and a unicameral village council of seven members. Chihayaakasaka collectively with the cities of Tondabayashi and Ōsakasayama, and other municipalities of Minamikawachi District contributes two members to the Osaka Prefectural Assembly. In terms of national politics, the village is part of Osaka 15th district of the lower house of the Diet of Japan.

== Economy ==
Chihayaakasaka was traditionally dependent on agriculture (notably shiitake) and forestry. The area suffers from an aging population and rural depopulation.

== Education ==
Chihayaakasaka has two public elementary schools and one public middle school operated by the village government. The village does not have a high school.

== Transportation ==
=== Railway ===
Chihayaakasaka does not have any passenger rail service. The nearest station is Kawachinagano Station or Tondabayashi Station.

=== Highway ===
- National Route 309

== Local attractions ==
- Chihaya Castle ruins, a National Historic Site
- Kami-Akasaka Castle ruins, a National Historic Site
- Kongō Range, a mountain range on Chihayaakasaka's eastern border
- Mount Kongō, the highest mountain in Osaka Prefecture
- Shimo-Akasaka Castle ruins, a National Historic Site
