= Siege of Akasaka =

1331 battle of the Genkō War

Coordinates: 34°27′34.99″N 135°37′7.00″E

Siege of Akasaka Castle
- Part of The Genkō War
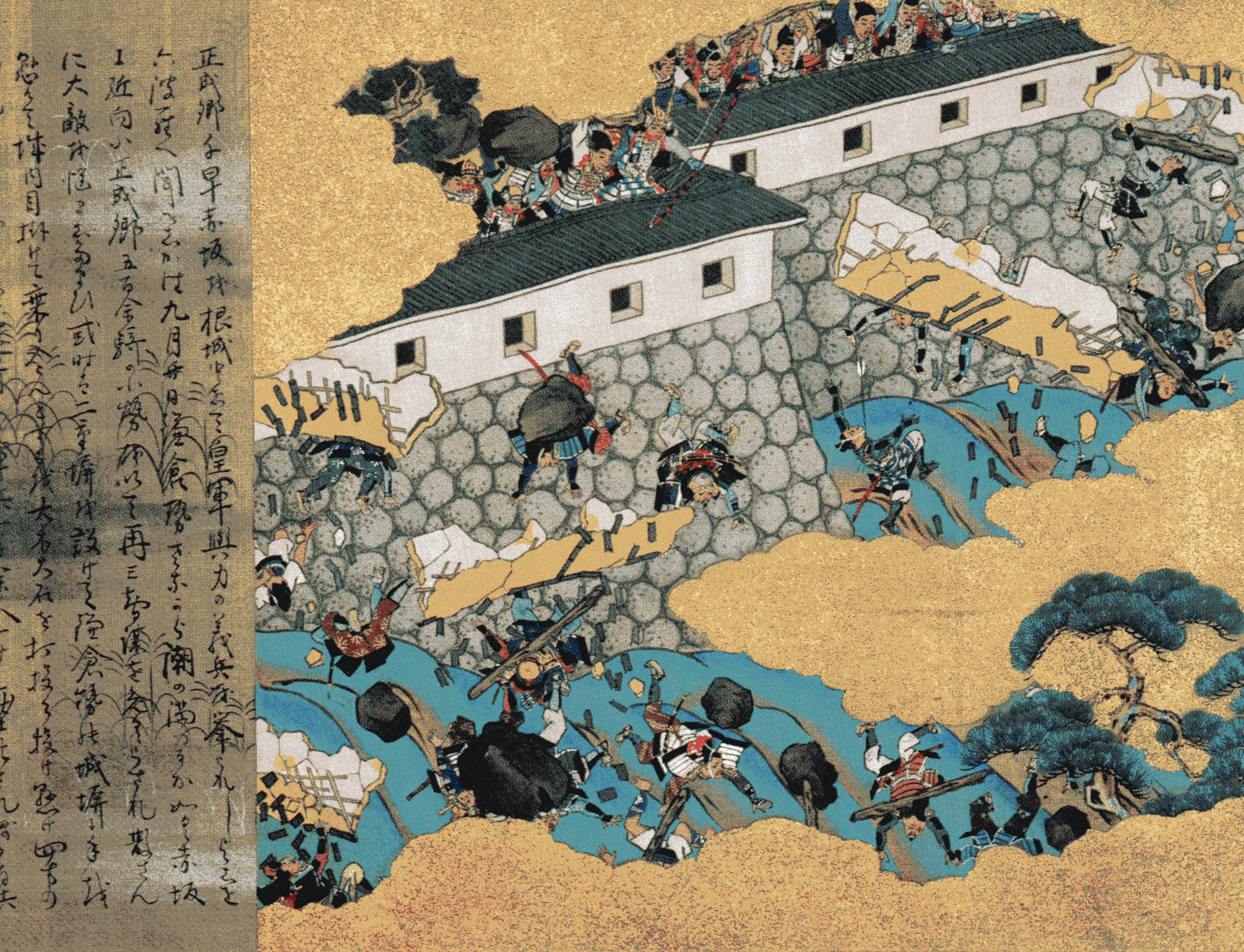
Date	September 11 to October 21, 1331
Location	Shimo & Kami Akasaka fortresses, Minami-Kawachi, near Osaka
Result	Hōjō victory, Prince Moriyoshi and Masashige escape
Territorial changes	Kawachi lost to the Shogunate, Akasaka falls.

Belligerents
Imperial forces	Hōjō forces

Commanders and leaders
Kusunoki Masashige; Kusunoki Shichiro	Hōjō Sadatadashi

Strength
500	10,000

Casualties and losses
	1,000 (est.)

The siege of Akasaka was one of the earlier battles of the Genkō War between the figurehead Emperor Godaigo and the largely Hōjō-controlled Kamakura shogunate during the final years of the Kamakura period in Japan. The battle in question was fought at Shimo Akasaka-jō (下赤坂城, English: Lower Akasaka fortress), a fortress built upon Mount Yoshino near modern-day Osaka in the former Kawachi Province in Osaka Prefecture.

== Background ==
For most of Japan's history, the Emperor was a powerless figurehead while real power rested in the Shogunate, and this was no different for Emperor Godaigo who was overshadowed by the Kamakura Shogunate. But in 1324, during the last few years of the Kamakura period, the Emperor plotted to overthrow the Shogunate but his plan was discovered. Undeterred, he tried again seven years later but was once again discovered due to the treachery of Fujiwara Sadafusa, Godaigo's trusted adviser. Realizing that he was at the end of his rope, the Emperor fled from Kyoto for Kasagi, and was besieged there by Kamakura Shogunate troops. Godaigo survived the siege, but he was banished to the Isles of Oki. Meanwhile, Kusunoki Masashige and Kusunoki Shichiro, two brothers who had sworn their allegiance to the Emperor, were gathering their forces at Shimo Akasaka, a fortress built upon Mount Yoshino, and were joined there by the Emperor's son, Prince Moriyoshi. As 200-300,000 Kamakura Shogunate soldiers arrived to besiege the fortress in November, Akasaka was garrisoned by 200 samurai inside the fort; a 5,850 square feet (543 m^{2}) palisade protected by 20-30 wooden towers under Masashige while another 300 samurai waited on a nearby hill under Kusunoki Shichiro's command.

== Battle ==
As soon as the battle started, Masashige set to work, inflicting heavy casualties upon the besiegers; his ingenuity in the battle was highly praised by sources, which say his "schemes were as ingenious as if they had sprung from the brain of Ch'en-p'ing or Chan-kuo Liang." However, his craftiness could not save him and his army from defeat when the Shogunate army cut off his water supply. Masashige proceeded to build a second castle, the Kami-Akasaka Castle or Kami Akasaka-jō (上赤坂城, English: Upper Akasaka fortress). This fort too was besieged, and it fell in March 1333.

During the initial assault by the Kamakura force, Masashige used skilled archers to kill or wound many before they retreated hastily to make camp for a longer siege. Kusunoki Shichiro picked this time to attack the camp with his horsemen from two sides, and was soon joined by more cavalry from the castle gates. The horsemen "broke through the enemy lines from every direction, cutting them down on all sides and so astounding the shogunate warriors that they could not form ranks."

In another assault, the Shogunate soldiers started scaling the outer wall, deceived by the silence from within. Unbeknownst to the attackers, they were scaling a fake wall which Masashige signaled to be collapsed. As the Kamakura troops hit the ground, Masashige's force subjected them to logs and stones hurled at them from within the fortress, inflicting grievous harm. In another instance, the attackers tried to grapnel the remaining wall, only to have boiling hot water poured on them by Masashige's men.

Three weeks into the siege, the Imperial troops were confronted with the starvation spreading through their ranks. In an attempt to finally break the siege, Masashige devised a plan in which his men disguised themselves as Shogunate soldiers and left the bodies of the slain combatants in the fort in a large pile of kindling. Thus disguised, Masashige's men were able to slip through the defenses. Once free, one man left behind lit the bonfire and the castle, deceiving the Kamakura soldiers into thinking they had committed suicide. Despite the apocryphal, the siege ended in Hōjō victory when Masashige and his men were cut off from their water supplies.

When Masashige and Moriyoshi escaped the first fortress, Masashige contacted the local merchants he had connections with and managed to raise a new army with the funds provided to him by them. After retaking Lower Akasaka, he built Kami-Akasaka upon a small plateau surrounded on three sides by a low valley. Unfortunately for Masashige, the Shogunate forces returned, besieged and defeated him again, and burned his fortress to the ground as well. However, he again escaped, this time fleeing to Chihaya Castle. Kami-Akasaka was razed.
