= Kazuyuki Akasaka =

Japanese baseball player

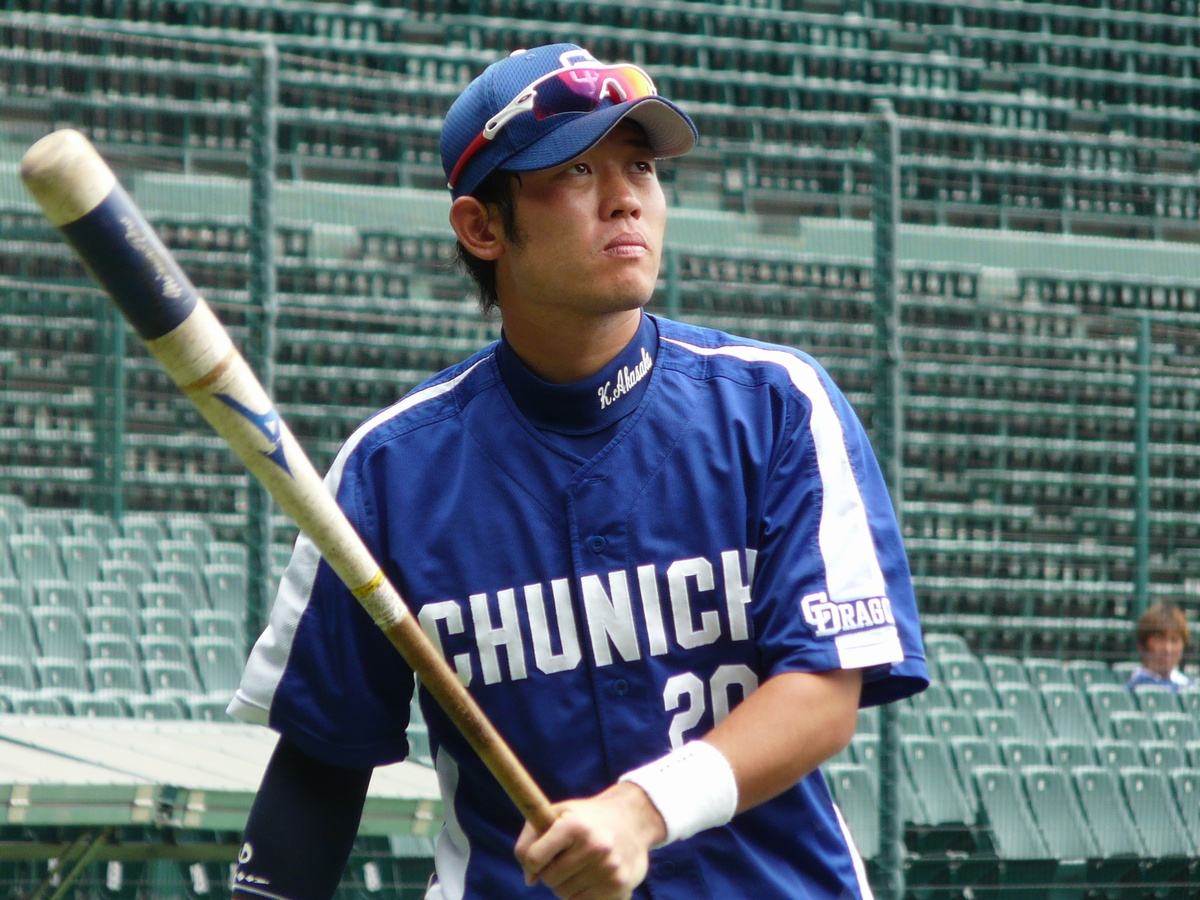

Chunichi Dragons – No. 69
- Outfielder
- Born: September 4, 1989 (age 36); Yokohama, Kanagawa, Japan
- Bats: Right Throws: Right

debut
- June 1, 2008, for the Chunichi Dragons

NPB statistics
- Batting average: .264
- Home runs: 0
- Runs batted in: 8
- Stats at Baseball Reference

Teams
- Chunichi Dragons (2008, 2015–2016)

Kazuyuki Akasaka (赤坂 和幸, Akasaka Kazuyuki; born September 4, 1989) is a Japanese Nippon Professional Baseball player. He is currently with the Chunichi Dragons.
