= Mount Kongō =

Mountain in Osaka, Kansai, Japan

- 金剛山; Kongō-san
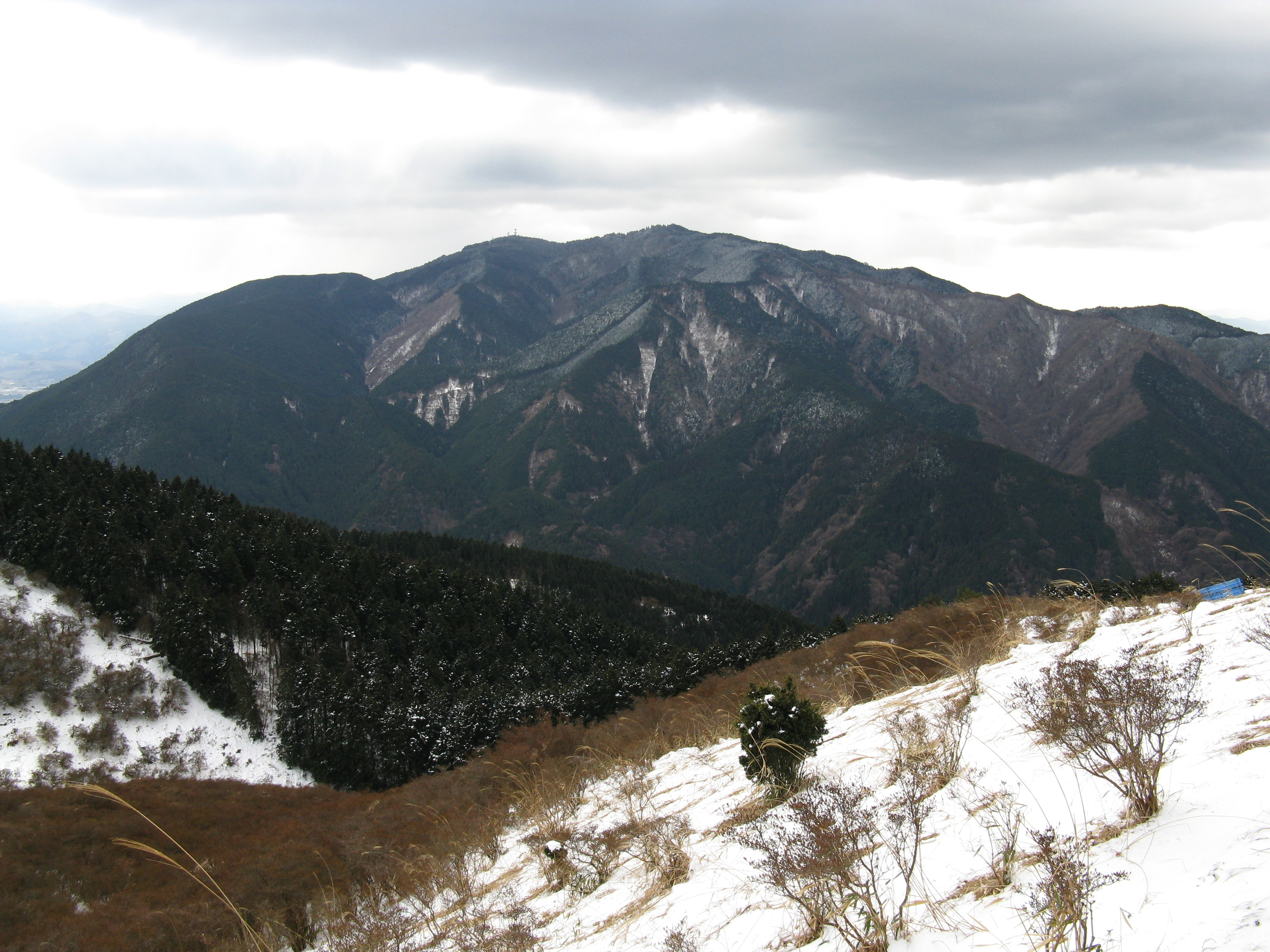
- Mount Kongō viewed from Mount Yamato Katsuragi (February 2010).

Highest point
- Elevation: 1,125 m (3,691 ft)
- Coordinates: 34°25′10″N 135°40′23″E

Naming
- English translation: Vajra Mountain
- Language of name: Japanese

Geography
- Location within Japan
- Location: Mount Kongō is located between Chihayaakasaka and Gose, Japan
- Parent range: Kongō Range

Mount Kongō (金剛山, Kongō-san) is a 1,125-metre-high (3,691 ft) mountain in the Kongō Range on the border of Nara Prefecture and the Kawachi region of Osaka Prefecture, in Kansai, Japan. The peak itself is in Nara Prefecture. It is near Mount Yamato Katsuragi.

The mountain has lent its name to a series of naval ships and ship classes: the Imperial Japanese Navy's 1877 ironclad Kongō; the 1912 battleship Kongō, the name ship of her class; and the Japan Maritime Self-Defense Force's current destroyer Kongō (DDG-173), also the name ship of her class.

== See also ==
- Mt. Kongō Ropeway
- Katsuragi 28 Shuku
- The 100 Views of Nature in Kansai
- Vajra (金剛)
