= Futagozuka Kofun (Osaka) =

Kofun period keyhole-shaped burial mound in Japan

- 二子塚古墳 (Japanese)
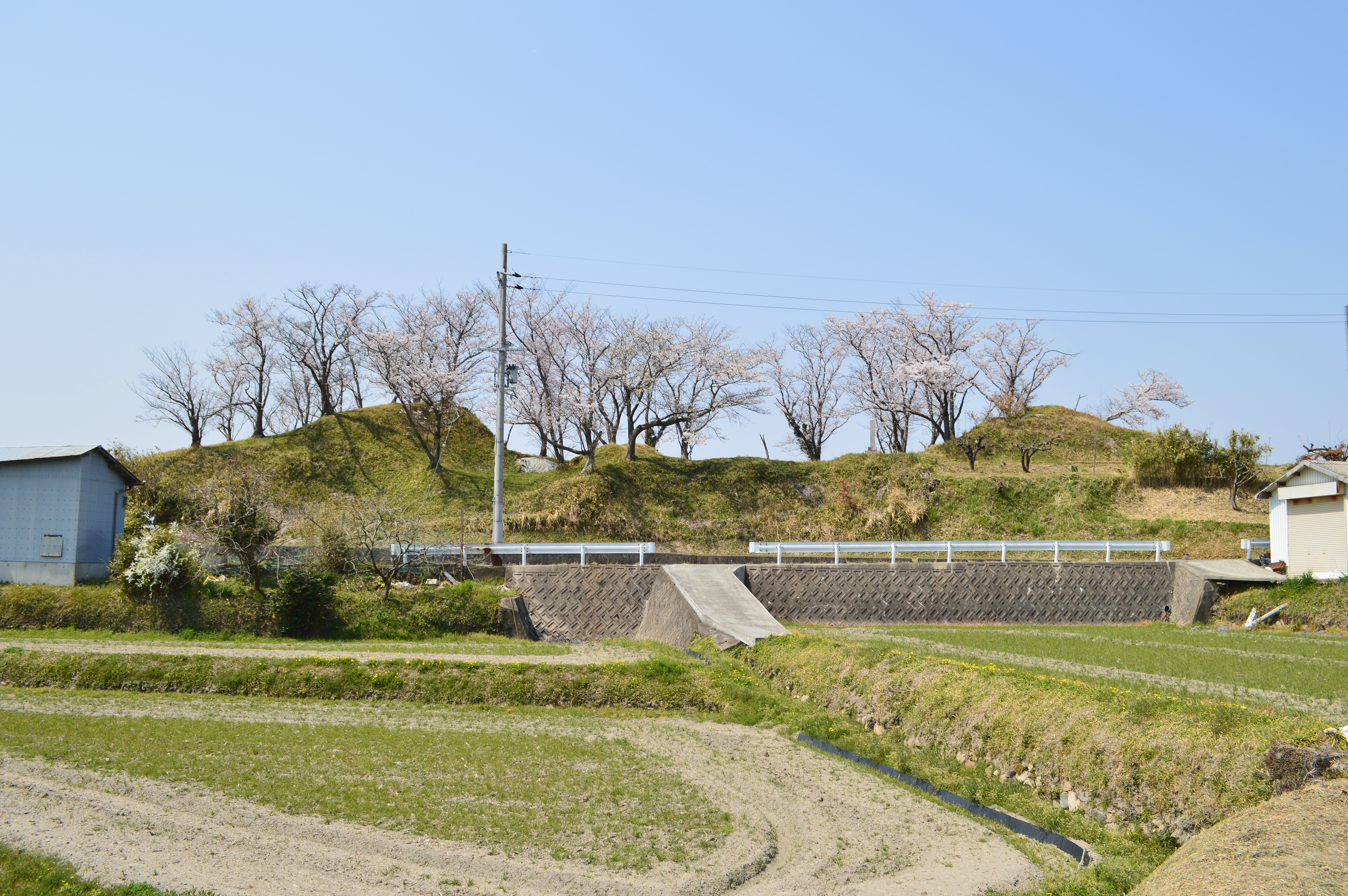
- Futagozuka Kofun

- Futagozuka Kofun Futagozuka Kofun (Osaka) (Japan)
- 34°30′38.96″N 135°39′5.65″E
- Type: Kofun
- Periods: Kofun period
- Location: Taishi, Osaka, Japan
- Region: Kansai region

History
- Built: c.7th century AD

Site notes
- Public access: Yes (Park)
- National Historic Site of Japan

The Futagozuka Kofun (二子塚古墳) is a Kofun period keyhole-shaped burial mound, located in the Yamaga neighborhood of the town of Taishi, Minamikawachi District, Osaka in the Kansai region of Japan. The tumulus was designated a National Historic Site of Japan in 1956, with the area under protection extended in 2019. It is one of the Isonagadani Kofun Cluster (磯長谷古墳群), a group of 30 kofun, five of which have been designated as imperial tombs by the Imperial Household Agency.

== Overview ==
The Futagozuka Kofun is an unusual sōhō-fun (双方墳), which is shaped like two conjoined squares, when viewed from above. It is located on a hill at the foot of Mount Nijō in the Kongō Range in southeastern part of Osaka Prefecture. Each tumulus is 25 meters on a side, and are connected in parallel along a northeast–southwest axis for a total length of about 66 meters. No fukiishi or haniwa have been found on the tumuli, although there is evidence of a moat. The horizontal-type stone burial chambers are almost the same shape and size on the east and west tumuli and both open to the southwest. The surface of one of the burial chambers retains traces of plastered walls. Inside each burial chamber was a house-shaped stone sarcophagus of almost the same shape and size with a semi-cylindrical lid stone with protrusion for hanging by ropes. Each has a length of about 2.2 meters, a width of about 1 meter, and a height of about 0.7 meters. The tumulus has been robbed in antiquity, and only some fragments of pottery and iron nails have survived of the grave goods. The tumulus estimated to date from the first half of the 7th century, or the end of the Kofun period, into the Asuka period.

There is a tradition that the Futagozuka Kofun is the true tomb of the 33rd Empress Suiko (died 628 AD) and her son Prince Takeda (died 593? AD), although the Imperial Household Agency has proclaimed the Yamada Takazuka Kofun (山田高塚古墳) 200 meters to the west to be her official grave site.

The Futagozuka Kofun is located about 14 minutes by car from Kaminotaishi Station on the Kintetsu Minami-Osaka Line.

Total length
66 meters:
Eastern rectangular portion
25 X 25 meters, 4.8 meters high, 3-tier
Western rectangular portion
25 X 25 meters, 6 meters high, 3-tier

== Gallery ==
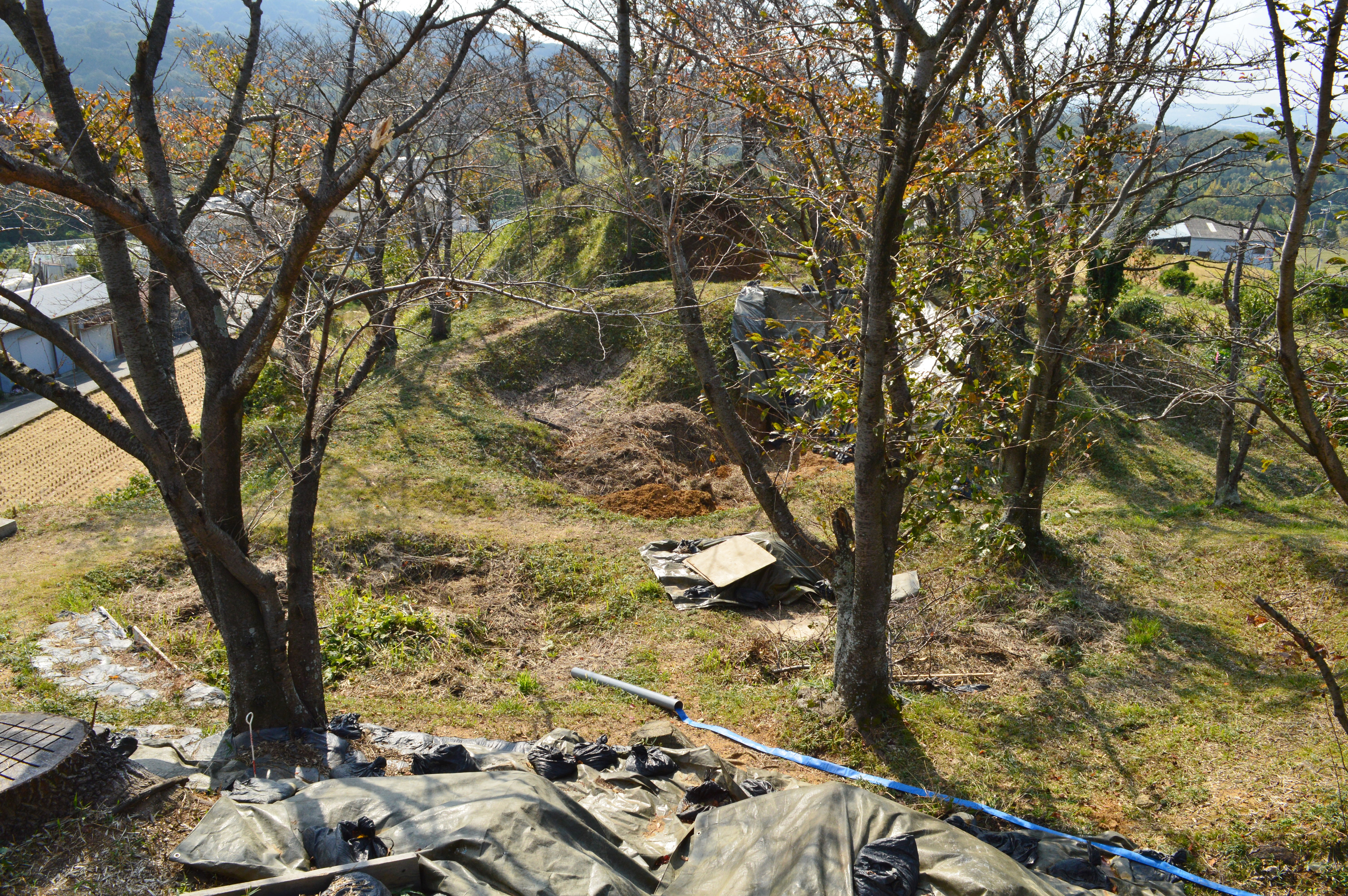
western tumulus

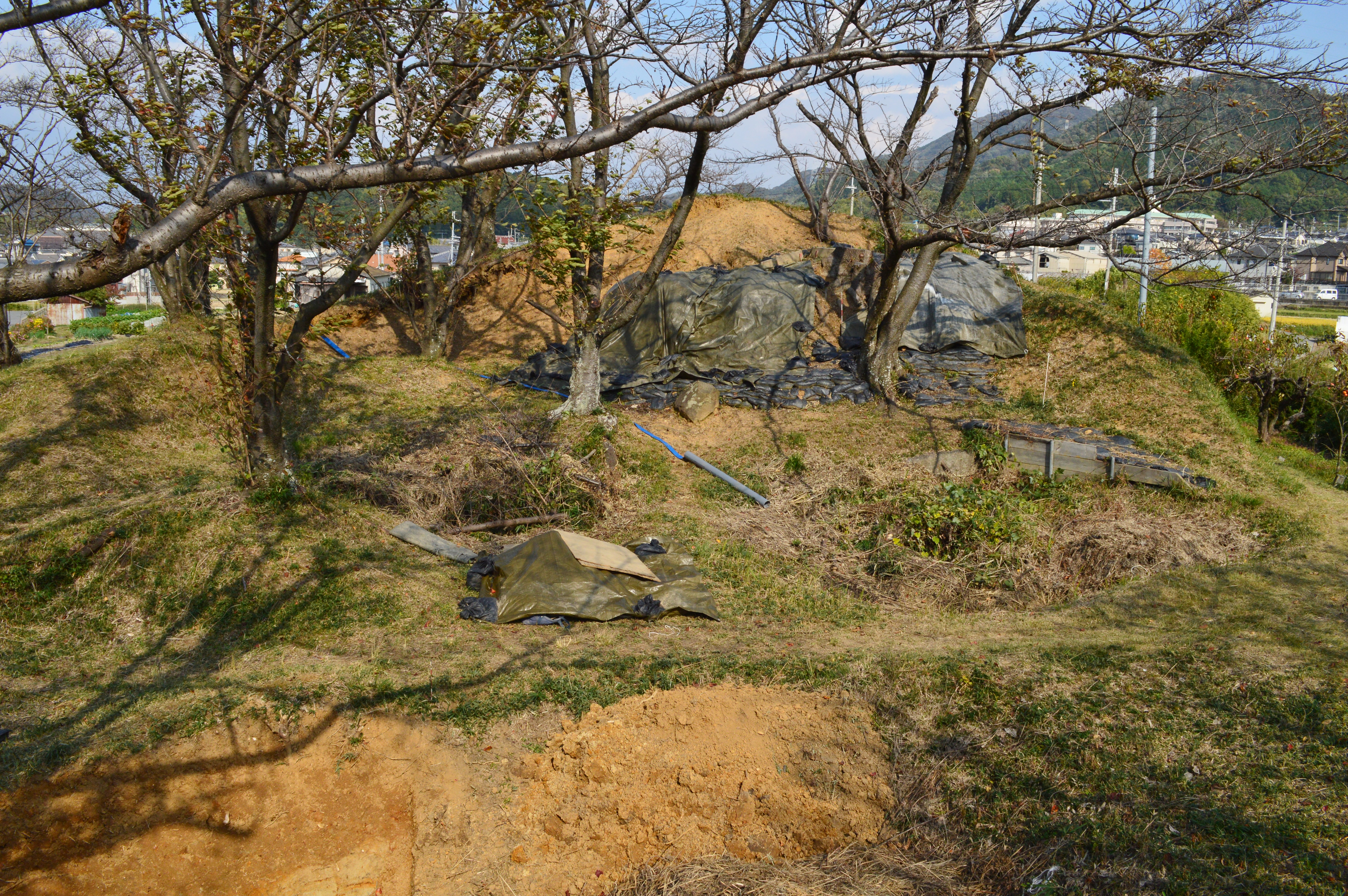
Eastern tumulus

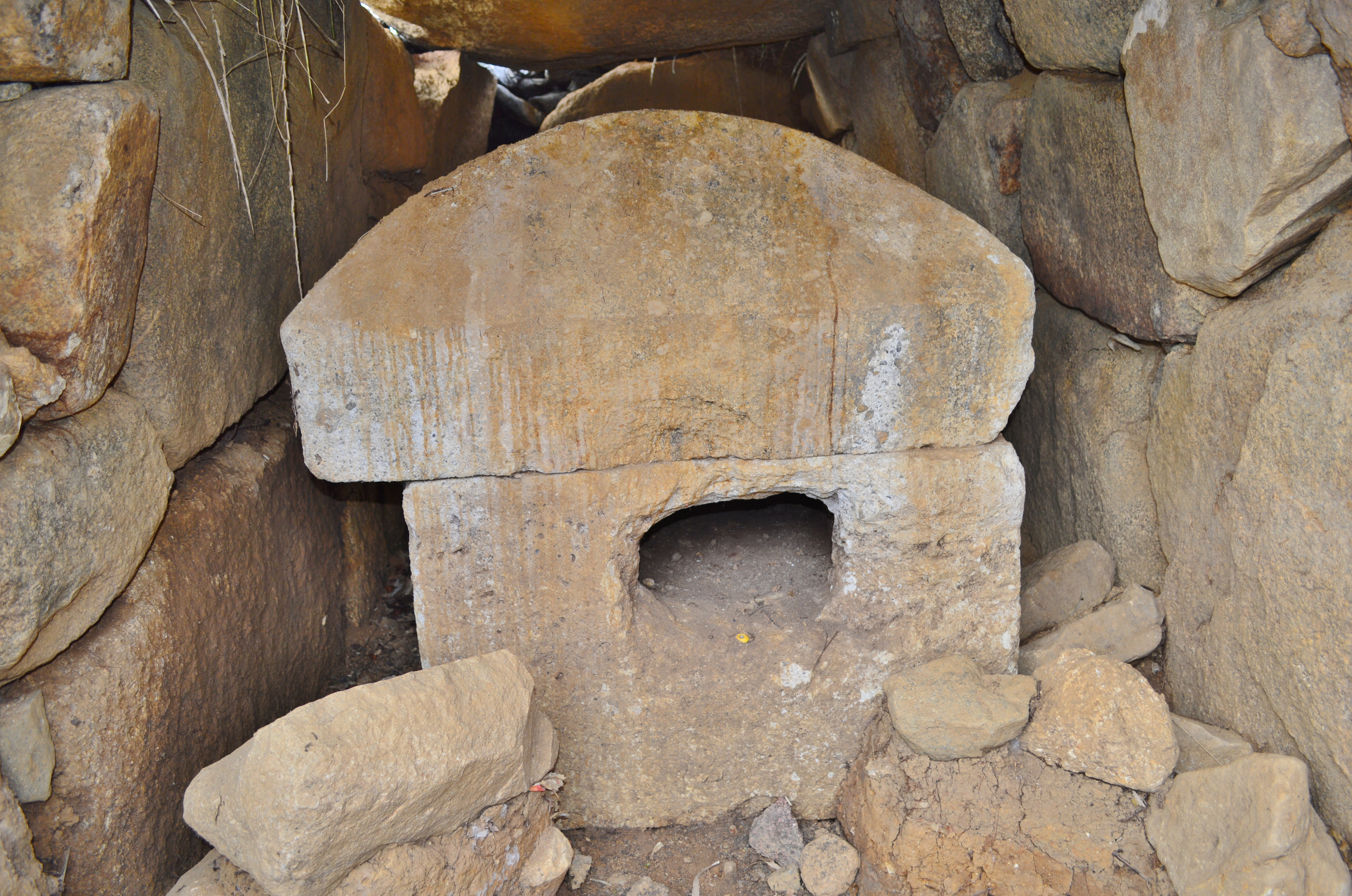
Eastern burial chamber and sarcophagus

== See also ==
- List of Historic Sites of Japan (Osaka)
- Japanese imperial tombs
