= Minami-Hanna Road =

National expressway in the Kinki region of Japan

Minami-Hanna Road
- 南阪奈道路

Route information
- Maintained by West Nippon Expressway Company
- Length: 16.9 km (10.5 mi)
- Existed: March 2004–present
- Component highways: National Route 165 / National Route 166

Major junctions
- West end: Mihara Junction
- East end: Katsuragi Interchange

Location
- Country: Japan
- Major cities: Habikino, Taishi, Katsuragi

Highway system
- National highways of Japan; Expressways of Japan

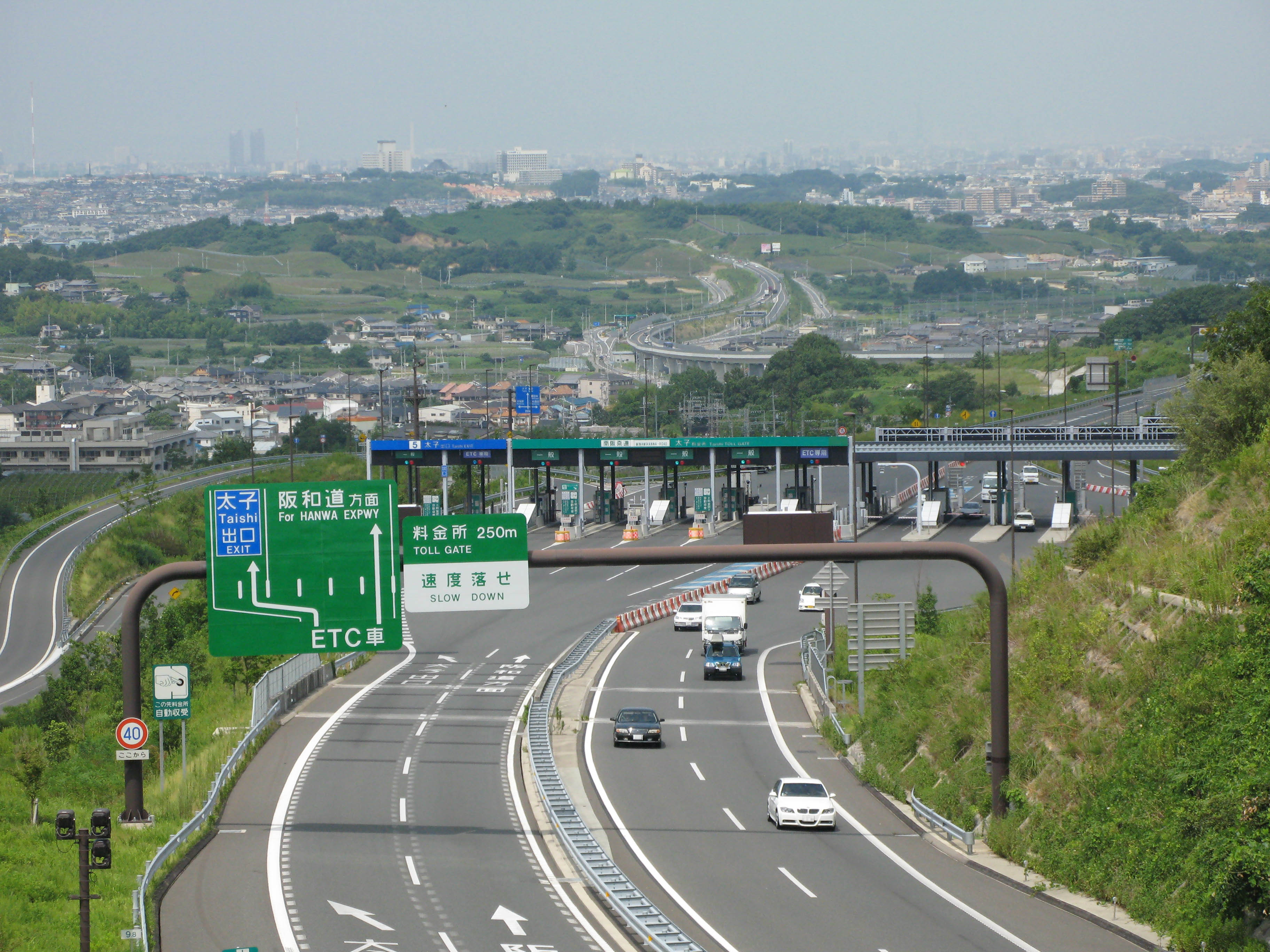
Taishi Toll Gate (For Mihara)

Minami-Hanna Road (南阪奈道路, Minami-Hanna Dōro) is a national expressway in the Kinki region of Japan. It is owned and operated by West Nippon Expressway Company. The route is signed E91 under Ministry of Land, Infrastructure, Transport and Tourism's "2016 Proposal for Realization of Expressway Numbering."

== Route description ==
Minami-Hanna Road passes through Mihara-ku, Sakai, Sakai, Habikino, back into Mihara-ku, Sakai, and Habikino, back into Mihara-ku, Sakai, Habikino, and finally Taishi in Osaka Prefecture. It then crosses into Katsuragi in Nara Prefecture.

== Naming ==
Hanna is a kanji acronym of two characters. The first character represents Osaka (大阪) and the second character represents Nara (奈良). Minami (南) means south.

== History ==
Construction on the toll road was completed on 28 March 2004. After opening, the road was managed by the Osaka Prefecutural Road Public Corporation and Japan Highway Public Corporation.

On 1 April 2018, the Osaka Prefecutural Road Public Corporation transferred ownership between Mihara Junction and Habikino Interchange and the tolling of the road to NEXCO West Japan.

== Junction list ==
TB= Toll booth

Prefecture	Location	km	mi	Exit	Name	Destinations	Notes
Osaka	Mihara-ku, Sakai	0.0	0.0	12-1	Mihara	Hanwa Expressway	Western terminus
Osaka	Mihara-ku, Sakai	0.0	0.0	1	Mihara	Osaka Prefecture Route 32 – Sakai, Taishi, Osaka Prefecture Route 36 – Izumiōtsu	Westbound exit, eastbound entrance
Osaka	Mihara-ku, Sakai			TB	Tajihaya Toll Gate		Eastbound tollbooth
Osaka	Mihara-ku, Sakai	2.2	1.4	2	Mihara-higashi	Osaka Prefecture Route 32	Westbound entrance, eastbound exit
Osaka	Habikino	4.6	2.9	3	Habikino	National Route 170 – Takatsuki, Izumisano, Osaka Prefecture Route 32	
Osaka	Habikino	7.5	4.7	4	Habikino-higashi	National Route 166 – Yamatotakada, Matsusaka	Westbound entrance, eastbound exit
Osaka	Taishi	9.5	5.9	5/TB	Taishi		
Osaka / Nara border				Takeuchi Tunnel; marking the border between Osaka and Nara prefectures			
Nara	Katsuragi	15.8	9.8	6	Katsuragi	National Route 166, Nara Prefecture Route 30 – Gose, Kashiba	Westbound entrance, eastbound exit
Nara	Katsuragi	16.9	10.5	—	Shinjō	National Route 24 / National Route 165 / National Route 166 (Yamato-Takada Bypass)	
1.000 mi = 1.609 km; 1.000 km = 0.621 mi: Incomplete access
