= List of mergers in Osaka Prefecture =

Here is a list of mergers in Osaka Prefecture, Japan since the Meiji era.

== Prefectural mergers and border changes ==
This list is incomplete. Many changes are missing.

=== Osaka before 1881 ===
- 1868 (Boshin war/Meiji restoration) – Osaka is established as prefecture (-fu) in succession to the shogunate administration in Osaka (bugyō→saibansho).
- August 1868 (sixth month, Meiji 1) – Sakai (previously shogunate city Sakai and shogunate domain in Izumi province) is established/separated from Osaka as prefecture (-ken).
- 1869 – Kawachi (previously shogunate lands in Kawachi province) is established/separated from Osaka as prefecture (-ken).
- 1869 – Settsu (previously shogunate lands in Settsu province; later renamed →Toyosaki) is established/separated from Osaka as prefecture (-ken).
- 1869 – Toyosaki is split between Osaka and Hyōgo.
- 1871/72 (Abolition of domains and first wave of prefectural mergers) – The prefectures Takatsuki and Asada are merged into Osaka. After consolidation, Osaka covers the Eastern part of Settsu province.

=== Nara before 1876 ===
See the List of mergers in Nara Prefecture

=== Sakai ===
- 1869 – Kawachi is merged into Sakai.
- 1870 – Sayama Domain is returned to the central government and merged into Sakai.
- 1870 – Mikami Domain with holdings in Ōmi and Izumi provinces moves the domain seat from Mikami in Ōmi (today: Yasu, Shiga) to Yoshimi in Izumi (today: Tajiri, Osaka) and becomes Yoshimi Domain.
- 1871/72 (Abolition of domains and first wave of prefectural mergers) – The prefectures Hakata, Kishiwada, Yoshimi and Tannan are merged into Sakai. After consolidation, Sakai encompasses all of Izumi and Kawachi provinces without exclaves/enclaves.
- 1876 – Nara is merged into Sakai.
- 1881 – Sakai is merged into Osaka prefecture.

=== Osaka since 1881 ===
- 1887 – Nara prefecture is split off from Osaka prefecture.

== District mergers ==
This list is incomplete. Some mergers are missing.

- 1878–80 (Reactivation of districts as administrative units, establishment of urban districts) – Osaka is subdivided into four urban districts (-ku) and seven [rural] districts (-gun) from ancient Settsu province. Sakai consists of one urban district and four [rural] districts from ancient Izumi province, 16 districts from Kawachi and 15 districts from Yamato (becomes Nara in 1887).
- 1896 – The districts Teshima and Nose are merged to form Toyono District.
- 1896 – The districts Ōtori and Izumi (from ancient Izumi Province) are merged to form Senboku-gun ("Izumi North district").
- 1896 – The districts Hine and Minami (from ancient Izumi Province) are merged to form Sennan-gun ("Izumi South district").
- 1896 – The districts Ishikawa, Nishigori, Yakami, Furuichi, Asukabe, Tannan and Shiki (from ancient Kawachi Province) are merged to form Minami-Kawachi ("South Kawachi") District
- 1896 – The districts Tanboku, Takayasu, Ōgata, Kawachi, Wakae and Shibukawa (from ancient Kawachi Province) are merged to form Naka-Kawachi ("Central Kawachi") District.
- 1896 – The district Matta, Katano and Sasara (from ancient Kawachi Province) are merged to form Kita-Kawachi ("North Kawachi") District.

== Municipal mergers ==
This list is incomplete. Most mergers are missing.

=== Establishment of modern municipalities 1889/1896 ===
After the modern municipalities (cities, towns and villages) were introduced and the Great Meiji mergers performed in 1889 and after the 1896 #District mergers, Osaka consisted of:

- 2 [district-independent] cities (-shi)
  - Four urban districts (Higashi-ku, Nishi-ku, Minami-ku, Kita-ku) become part of the new Osaka City (Ōsaka-shi) in 1889.
  - The urban district Sakai (Sakai-ku) becomes Sakai City (Sakai-shi) in 1889.
- 9 districts (-gun)
  - Nishinari: 2 towns, 30 villages, district seat: Kami-Fukushima-mura ("Upper Fukushima Village")
  - Higashinari: 4 towns, 26 villages, district seat: Tennōji Village
  - Mishima: 32 villages, district seat: Ibaraki Village
  - Toyono: 1 town, 22 villages, district seat: Ikeda Town
  - Senboku/Izumi North: 40 villages, district seat: Ōtori Village
  - Sennan/Izumi South: 3 towns, 40 villages, district seat: Kishiwada Town
  - Minami-/South Kawachi: 41 villages, district seat: Tondabayashi Village
  - Naka-/Central Kawachi: 40 villages, district seat: Yao Village
  - Kita-/North Kawachi: 2 towns, 31 villages, district seat: Hirakata Town

=== Mergers 1889–1950 ===
- 1890 – Sawada Village in Shiki District is merged into Dōmyōji Village.
- 1892 – Naka-Niwa Village and Minami-Niwa Village in Ōtori District merge to form Niwadani Village.

=== Mergers in the 1950s (Great Shōwa mergers) ===
==== Mergers since the 1960s ====
- On February 1, 2005 - The town of Mihara (from Minamikawachi District) was merged into the expanded city of Sakai. Since then, Sakai has been split into wards of which Mihara-ku is one.
