= Iwaya (Taishi) =

Cave-temple in Osaka Prefecture, Japan

- 岩屋 (Japanese)
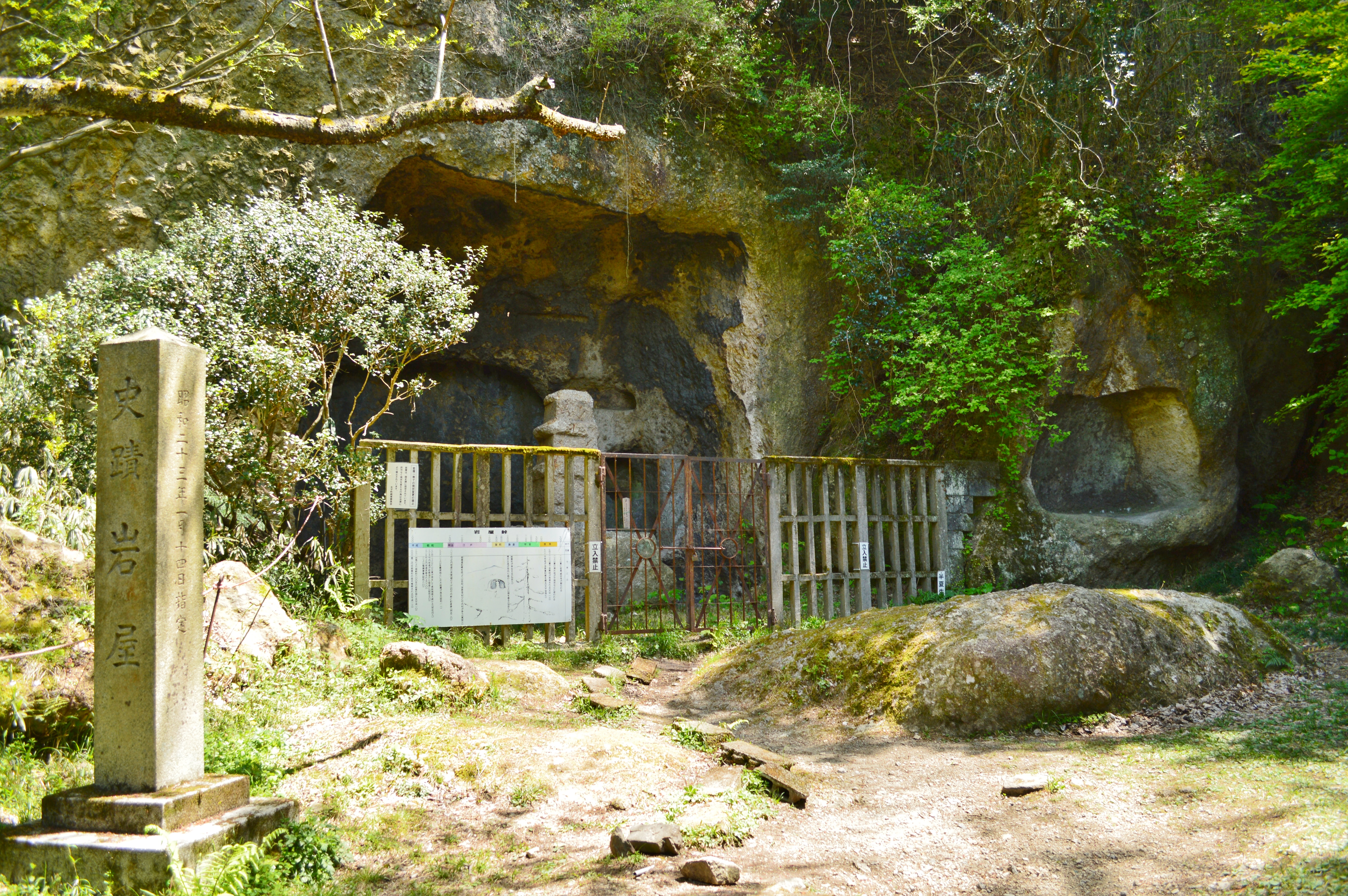
- Iwaya

- Iwaya Iwaya (Taishi) (Japan)
- Interactive map of Iwaya
- 34°31′13″N 135°40′35″E
- Periods: Heian period
- Location: Taishi, Osaka, Japan
- Region: Kansai region

Site notes
- Public access: Yes (no facilities)

The Iwaya (岩屋) is an ancient ruined cave-temple located in the Yamada neighborhood of the town of Taishi, Minamikawachi District, Osaka in the Kansai region of Japan. The site was designated a National Historic Site of Japan in 1948.

== Overview ==
The Iwaya is located on the south slope of the Iwaya Pass at an elevation of 360 meters, to the east of Rokutan-ji temple ruins. It consist of two shallow artificial caves cut into a tuff cliff facing west-southwest. The larger cave has a width of 7.6 meters, height of 6.1 meters and depth of 4.5 meters, and contains three carvings in bas relief in the center. There is a smaller cave on the same cliff to the south with a stone pagoda. The carving is damaged, but it was at least three stories, and the remaining height is 2.1 meters. The cave-temple is located along the route of the Takenouchi Kaido, an ancient highway which connected Asuka and Yamato Province with the seacoast of Osaka Bay. This was the route taken by the Japanese missions to Imperial China during the Asuka and Nara periods, and this type of cave-temple was common on the Asian continent, but was very rare for Japan.

There is no documentary record of when the cave-temple was made, but it is believed to have been founded in the first half of the 9th century, based on a quantity of coins dated 796 AD which have been found at the site. There is a local legend which states that this was the location where Chūjō-hime wove the Taima mandala.

== Gallery ==
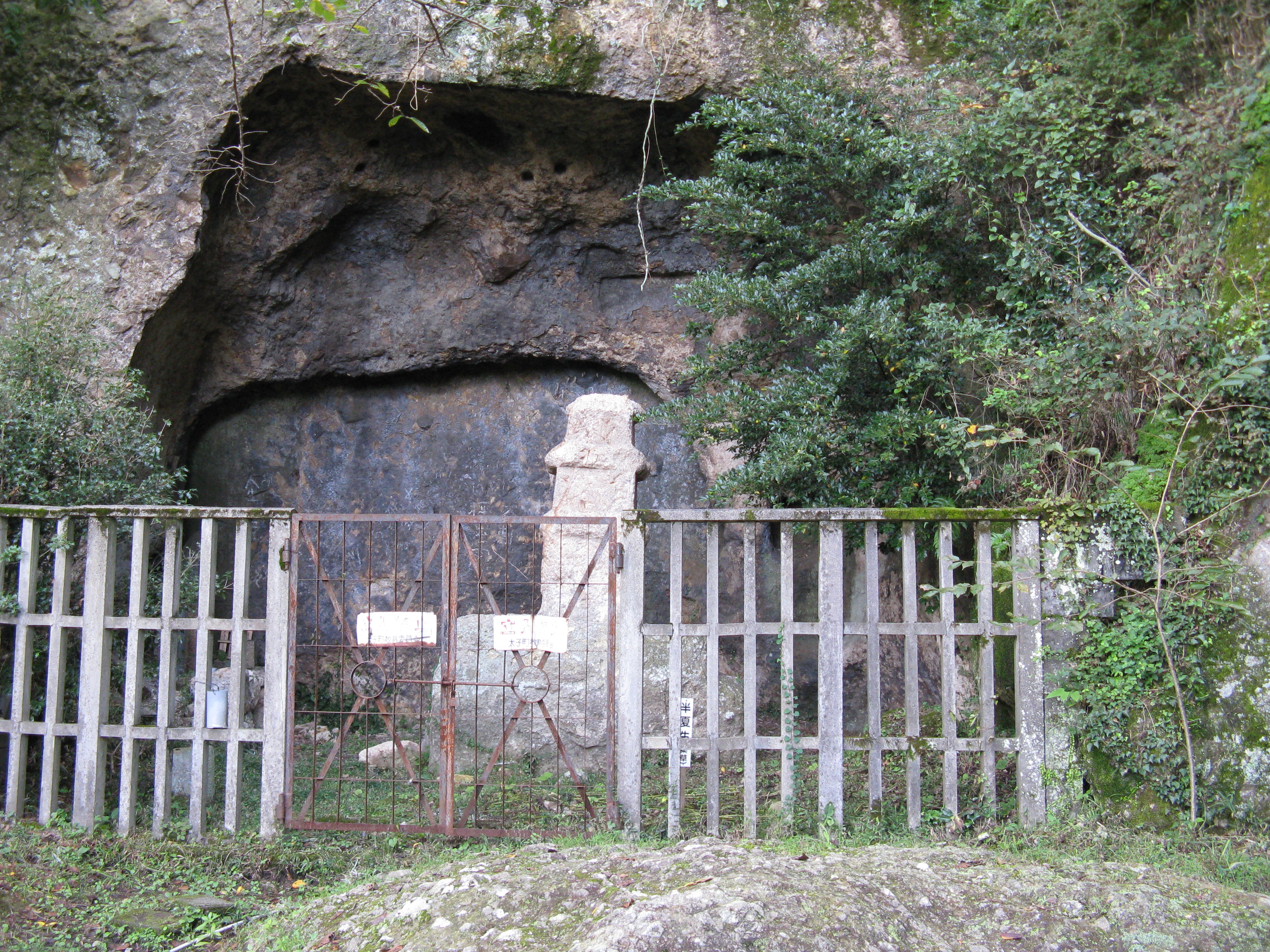
Iwaya larger cave

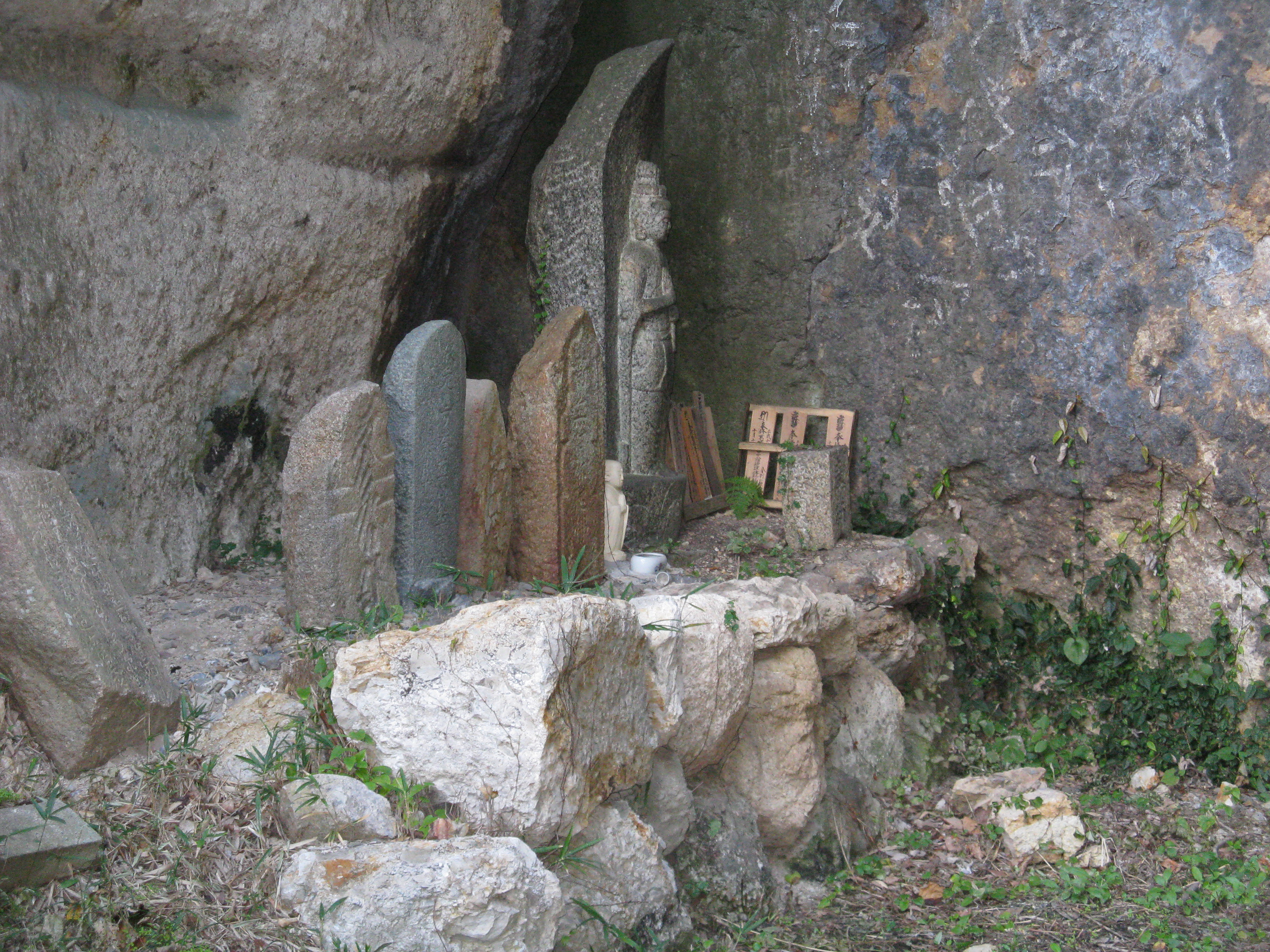
Iwaya smaller cave

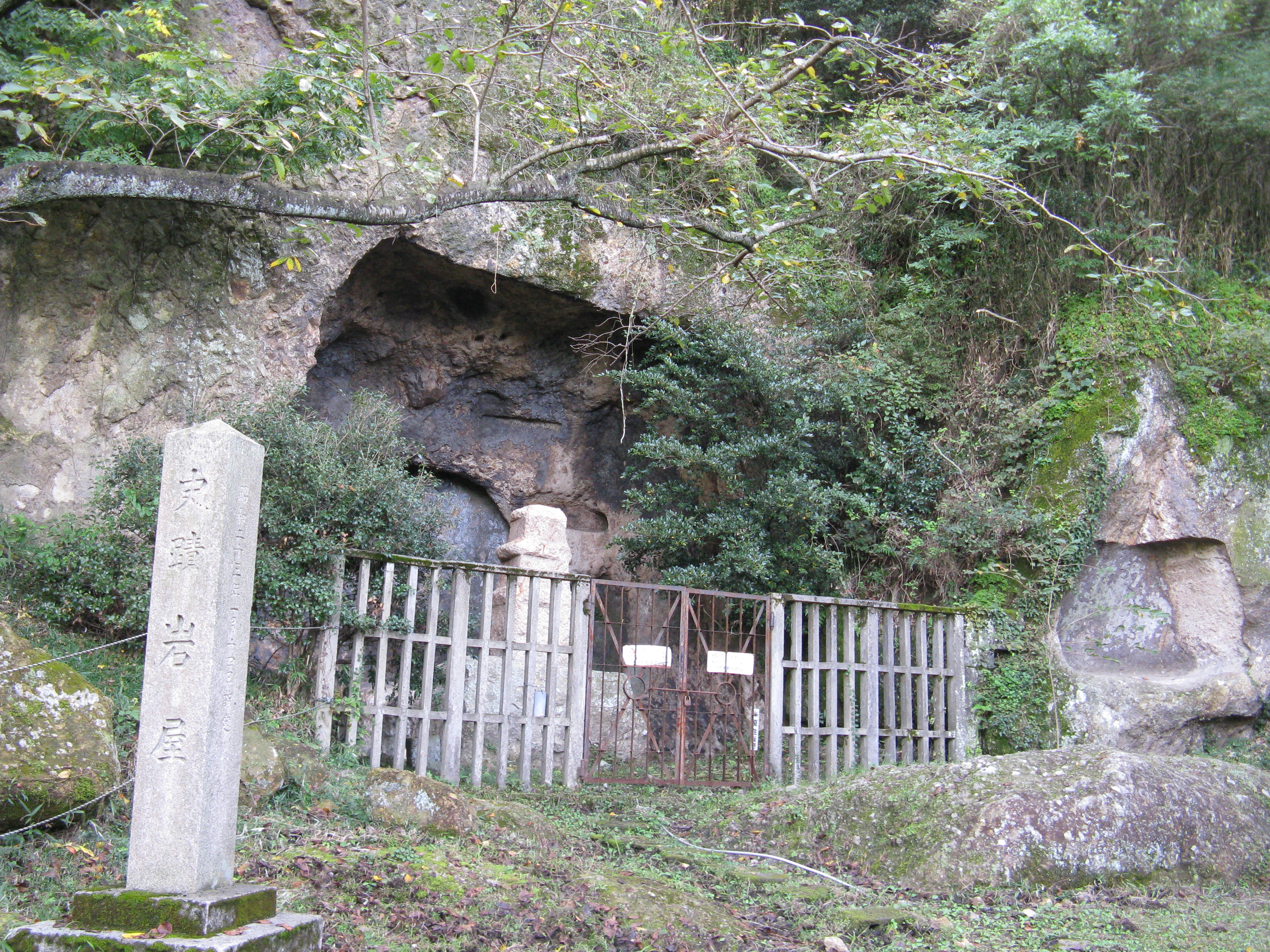
Panoramic view

== See also ==
- List of Historic Sites of Japan (Osaka)
