= Kannonzuka Kofun =

- 観音塚古墳 (Japanese)
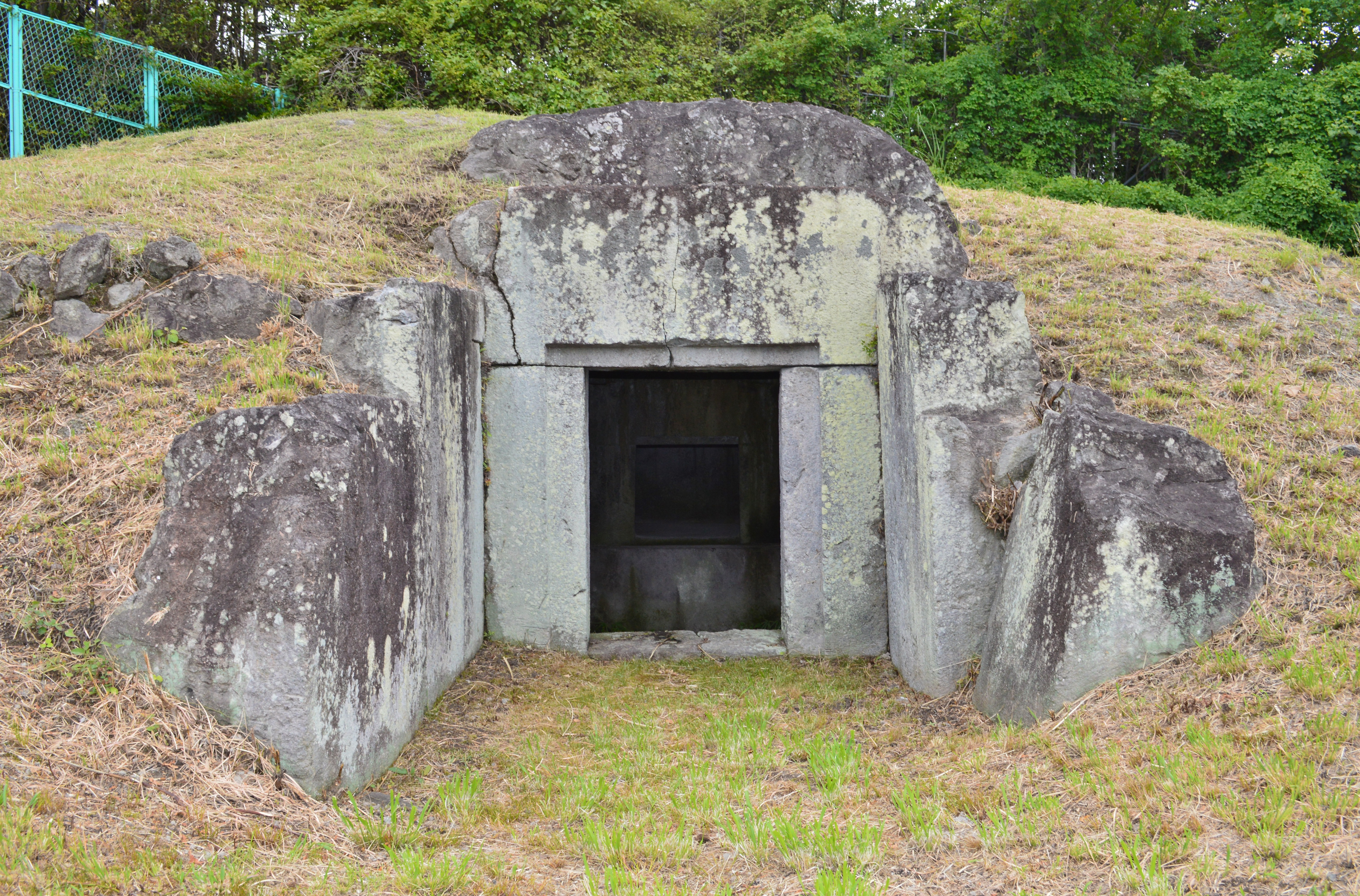
- Kannonzuka Kofun

- Kannonzuka Kofun Kannonzuka Kofun (Japan)
- Interactive map of Kannonzuka Kofun
- 34°32′15″N 135°38′29″E
- Type: Kofun
- Periods: Kofun period
- Location: Habikino, Osaka, Japan
- Region: Kansai region

History
- Built: c. 7th century

Site notes
- Public access: Yes (No facilities)

The Kannonzuka Kofun (観音塚古墳) is a Kofun period burial mound, located in the Asuka neighborhood of the town of Habikino, Osaka in the Kansai region of Japan. The tumulus was designated a National Historic Site of Japan in 1991.

== Overview ==
The Kannozuka Kofun is a circular enpun (円墳)-style tumulus. It is located on the southeastern slope of a ridge extending south from Mount Hachibuse, at an elevation of 98 metres (322 ft). It is a survivor of what was once a large cluster of kofun, most of which have been destroyed to make farmland or due to urban encroachment. The tumulus has a diameter of 12 metres (39 ft) and height of 2.5 metres (8 ft 2 in). The burial chamber is side entry, and was made by stacking dacite ashlars produced in the surrounding area. The stone sarcophagus (193 cm × 92 cm [76 in × 36 in], height 78 cm [31 in]) has a side opening on the south side edge, which once held a door. In front of it, there is a front room (245 cm × 144 cm [96 in × 57 in], height 112 cm [44 in]) that combines stones in a mosaic pattern, with sleeve stones at the entrance, beam stones passed above, and a two-step facility below.. The floor is a mosaic of seven stones on the east side and eight on the west side, fitted so closely together that there are no gaps. This advanced stonework has led to speculation that the tomb was built either with technical knowledge of construction techniques from the Korean Peninsula, or possibly by immigrants from Goguryeo. The burial facility has been open since before the Meiji era, and it if unknown is any grave goods have ever been recovered.

From the style of construction, it is thought that the tumulus was built in the latter half of the 7th century, or into the Asuka period.

The tumulus is about a 15-minute walk from Kaminotaishi Station on the Kintetsu Minami-Osaka Line.

== Gallery ==
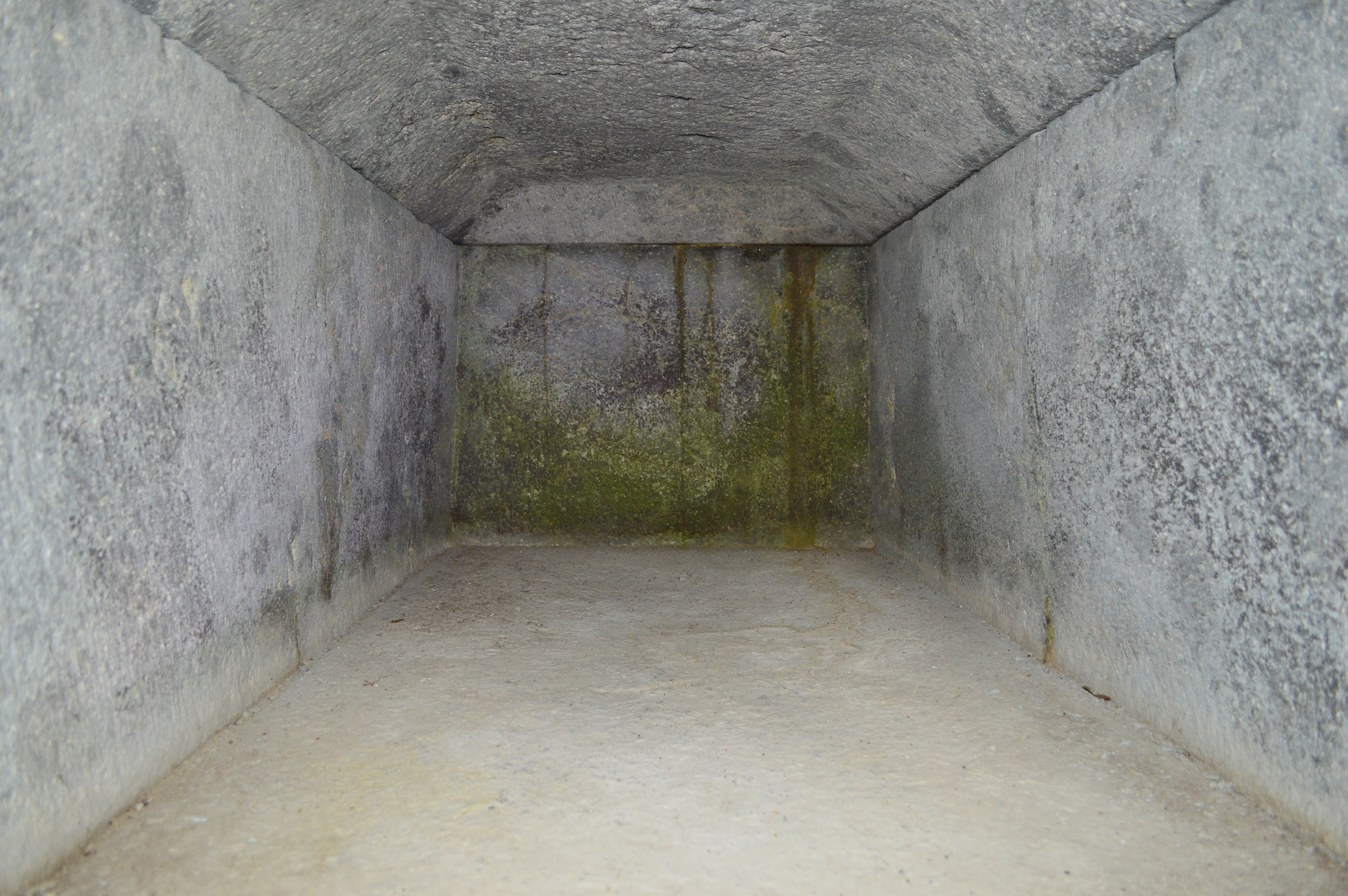
BurialChamber

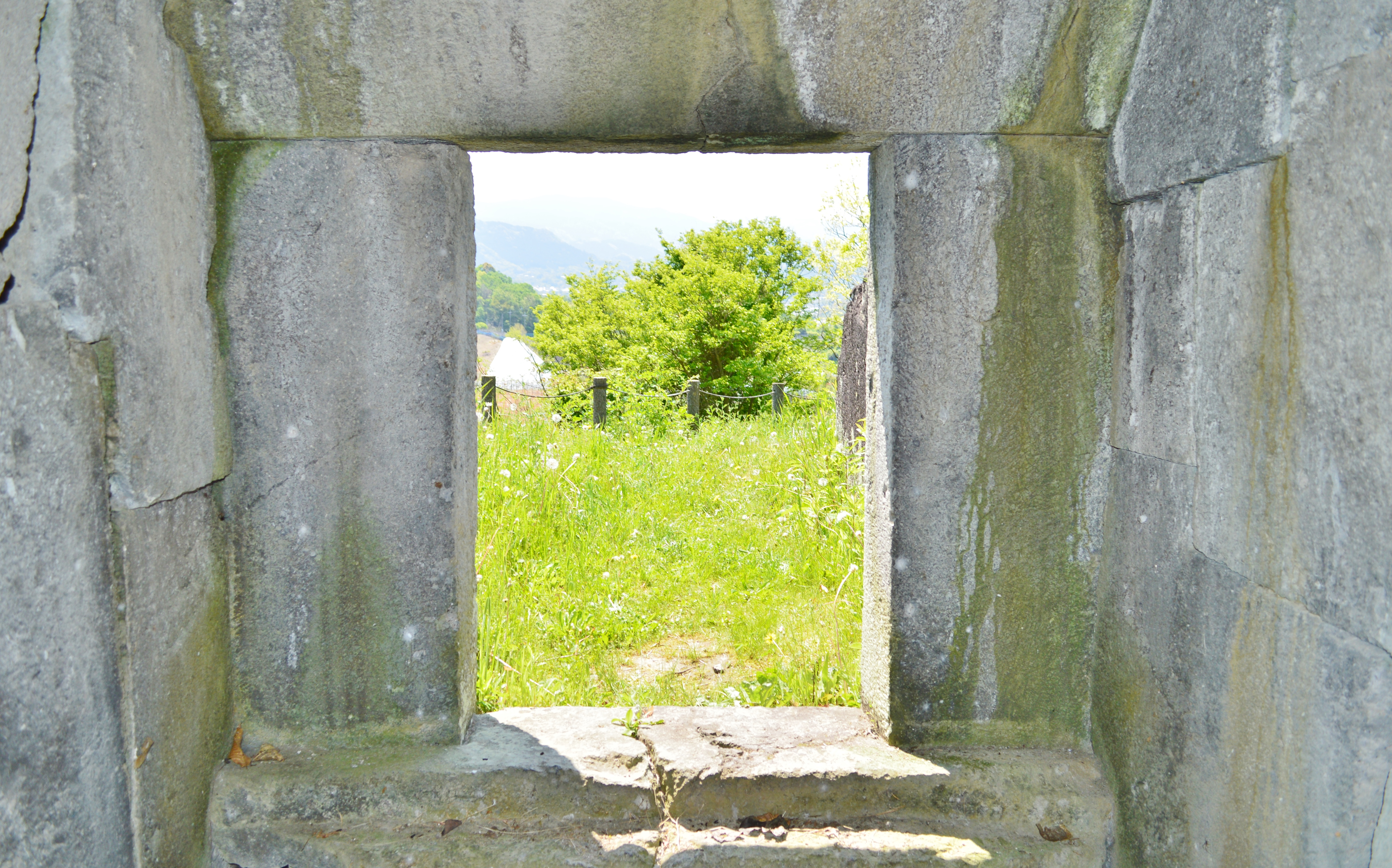
Front chamber (toward the opening)

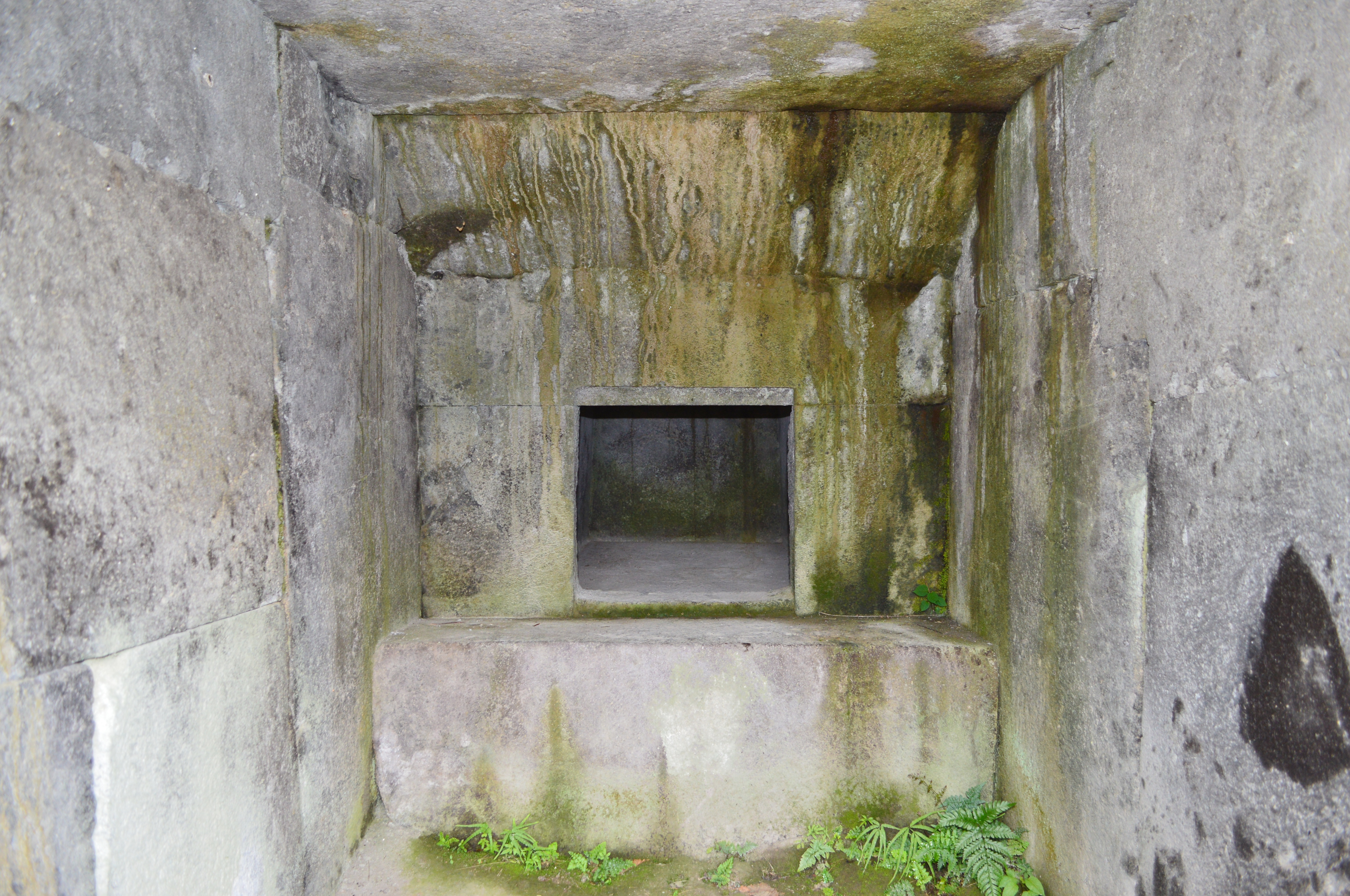
Front chamber (toward the sarcophagus)

== See also ==
- List of Historic Sites of Japan (Osaka)
