= E91 =

E91 may refer to:

- E91 protocol, a protocol of Quantum Cryptography
- E91, a car of the BMW 3 Series
- King's Indian Defense, Encyclopaedia of Chess Openings code
- European route E91, one of the many routes in the European route network.
- Minami-Hanna Road and Yamatotakada Bypass, route E91 in Japan.
