= Fuhanken sanchisei =

Subnational governmental structure

The fuhanken sanchisei (Japanese: 府藩県三治制; "fu, han and ken three-tiered governance system") was the subnational government structure in early Meiji Japan. It lasted from the Boshin War, the start to the Meiji Restoration, in 1868 until the replacement of all remaining feudal domains (han) with prefectures (ken) in 1871. During this period, prefectures, urban prefectures (府, fu) and rural prefectures (県, ken), controlled by the new central government, and daimyō domains (藩, han), still under their pre-restoration feudal rulers, formed the primary administrative subdivisions of the country. The exact numbers varied continually as adjustments to the feudal territorial divisions, mergers and splits started to take up pace, but very roughly there were about more than 250 han and about fewer than 50 fu / ken in total during this time.

As the political borders changed all the time, ancient ritsuryō provinces, essentially static except for some modernizing adjustments in the North where the giant provinces of Mutsu and Dewa (both Tōsan Circuit) were split up and a new circuit (Hokkai Circuit) with 10 provinces was added on Ezo, remained the primary geographic frame of reference even in Meiji Japan until around the turn of the century – just as they had been throughout the late Middle Ages and early modern period.

== Background ==
Ignoring minor territories such as Imperial Court lands or spiritual (shrine/temple) holdings, pre-restoration Japan was subdivided two types of territories: 1. the bakufu/shogunate territories (baku-ryō, subsequently also called ten-ryō, "Imperial territories") held by the Tokugawa directly through local administrators (daikan, bugyō, etc.) or the shogunate's minor vassals (sometimes grouped separately as hatamoto-ryō) and 2. other families' feudal domain holdings (han-ryō). In the Boshin War and the beginning Meiji Restoration, the conquered/surrendered shogunate lands and a few rebel/shogunate loyalist domains such as Aizu/Wakamatsu or Morioka/Morioka were organized in prefectures (urban fu and rural ken) while all other feudal domains (han) were allowed to continue to exist until 1871. Some domains were only newly created in the restoration, such as Shizuoka Domain which was granted to the Tokugawa after their fall and submission to the new government, or Tonami Domain which was created from parts of Morioka and left to a child heir of Aizu after the main territory of Aizu had been vanquished. The subnational administration in this period from 1868 to 1871 when centrally governed prefectures coexisted as primary subdivision of the country with domains, pledged into submission to the new Satsuma-Chōshū-dominated Imperial government, but still governed by their Tokugawa period feudal rulers, constitutes the -fu/-han/-ken system.

== Territorial composition and naming ==
Some of the current prefectures of Japan were created in this period, but they looked very different from what they are today, still with many disjoint feudal period ex- and enclaves as the domains remained mostly untouched and only the ex-shogunate/Imperial lands became prefectures. Some examples:

- Nagasaki Prefecture in 1868, successor to the Nagasaki bugyō, covered less than what is today Nagasaki City and surrounding shogunate lands, was later expanded to include even what is today Saga Prefecture to recede to its current borders in 1883.
- Osaka Prefecture, successor to the Osaka machi-bugyō, covered less than what is today Osaka City plus former shogunate territories mostly in Settsu Province, it was later expanded to include even what is today Nara Prefecture, it reached its current borders in 1887 (see the List of mergers in Osaka Prefecture)
- The first Nara Prefecture of 1868 covered shogunate territories in Yamato Province; in the 1871/72 first wave of prefectural mergers which followed the replacement of all feudal domains (-han) with prefectures (-ken) (called "abolition of -han & establishment of -ken" [haihan-chiken] in Japan, Abolition of the han system in the English Wikipedia), it was merged with the other prefectures in Yamato to cover all of Yamato. Nara ceased to exist in the second wave of prefectural mergers in 1876 when it was merged into Sakai Prefecture (堺県). (see Nara Prefecture#The establishment of Nara Prefecture)
- Shogunate territories in Ōmi Province which had been governed by the Ōtsu bugyō became Ōtsu Prefecture (大津県) in 1868. In the replacement of domains with prefectures in 1871 and the subsequent prefectural mergers, Ōtsu was enlarged and several of the new, other prefectures/ex-domains in Ōmi Province (Hikone, Ōmi-Miyagawa, Yamakami, Asahiyama) were merged to become Inukami Prefecture (犬上県), then, in 1872, Ōtsu and Inukami were merged to become Shiga Prefecture, it reached its present borders in 1881. (see Shiga Prefecture#History)
- The port town of Niigata had come under direct shogunate control in the 1840s, it was a (planned) treaty port forced open under the unequal treaties with the European colonial powers (Harris Treaty 1858); in 1868, the Shogunate controlled town (much less than what is today Niigata City which reached its current extent in 2005) and the scattered surrounding shogunate holdings in Echigo Province became Echigo Prefecture (越後府), later renamed to Niigata. The shogunate administration of fully Shogunate-controlled Sado Province became Sado Prefecture (佐渡県) in the restoration, later renamed to Aikawa. The fiefdoms in Echigo held by other families stayed fiefdoms in Echigo until fiefdoms were replaced with prefectures in 1871. Another prefecture to be created in Echigo Province was Kashiwazaki Prefecture (柏崎県). After a series of repeated mergers, name changes and splits (see the individual articles for details), the prefectures in Echigo and Sado were ultimately merged to become one single prefecture, present-day Niigata Prefecture. It reached essentially its current borders in 1886 when East Kanbara County was transferred from Fukushima to Niigata.

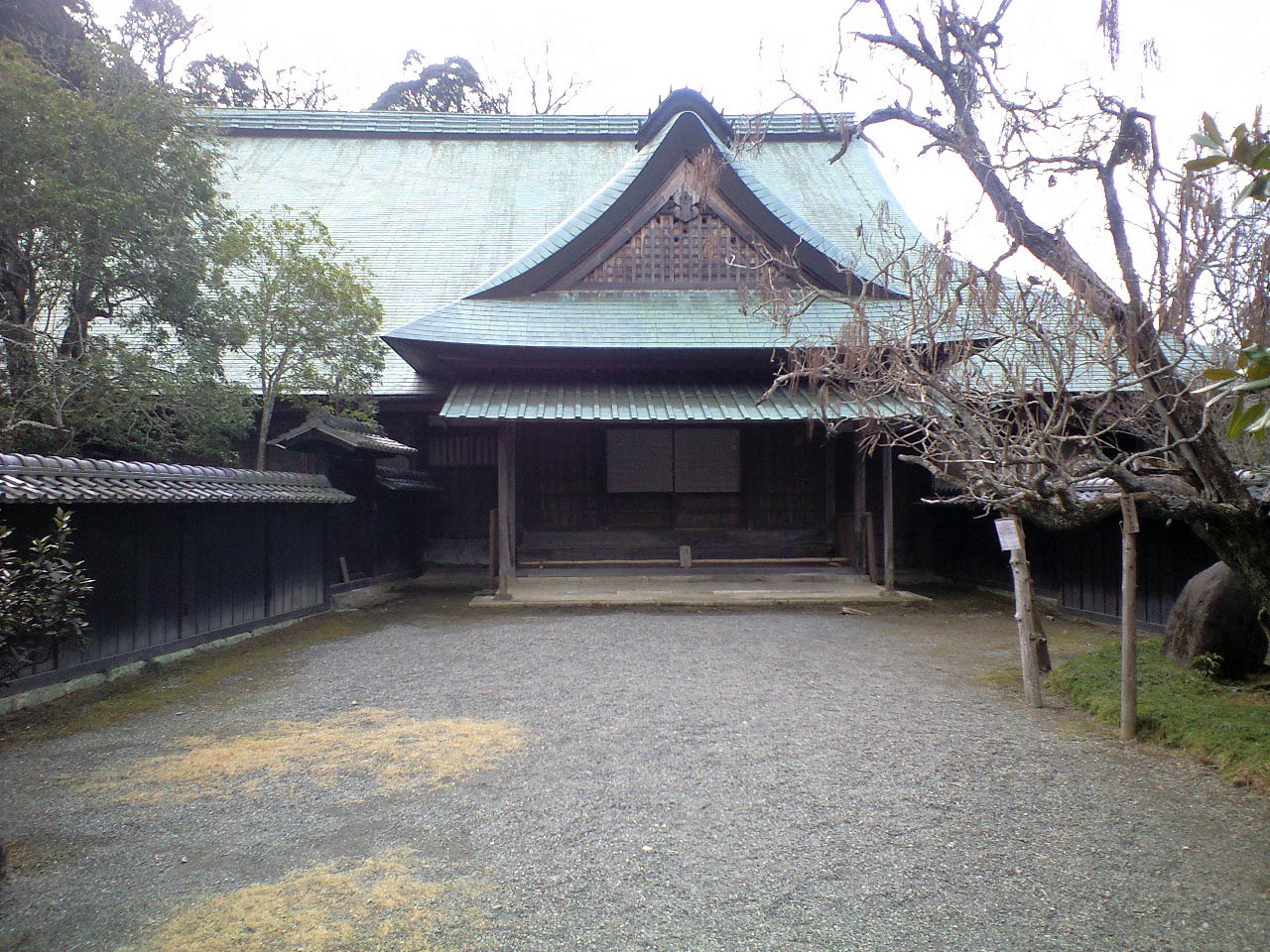
Residence of the Egawa family that held the position of Nirayama daikan in the Edo period; an Egawa subordinate, Kashiwagi Tadatoshi, went on to serve as prefectural governor of Nirayama and Ashigara for the new Meiji government; but in many other places local Tokugawa-era leaders were replaced with Satsuma-Chōshū nobles.

Other prefectures only existed under the fu/han/ken system. For example, Nirayama-ken replaced the Nirayma daikan, the shogunate administrator of shogunate possessions in Izu, Suruga, Sagami and Musashi provinces, seated in Nirayama in Izu Province. Its main part was merged into Ashigara Prefecture in 1871/72 while exclaves went to other prefectures. Since the 1880s, Nirayama's former territory is split between Shizuoka, Yamanashi, Tokyo, Kanagawa and Saitama.

It was the convention to name prefectures and han after the location of their [actual or in some cases: planned] prefectural/domain government, either by town/village or later often by ritsuryō district (e.g. Mie, Saitama, Inba, Gunma). ken created in 1871 are generally named after their precursor han.

== History ==
In June 1868, an interim constitution called the Seitaisho (政体書) was proclaimed, drafted by Fukuoka Takachika and Soejima Taneomi, which established central government in Japan under the Meiji government. The act dissolved the Tokugawa era court houses, creating government controlled prefectural governors called chifuji (知府事) and chikenji (知県事). All other areas still under the power of a daimyo, han, were left as they were with no structure changes, and an independent justice system.

On June 14, 1868, Hakodate-fu and Kyoto-fu were established as the first two prefectures under the new changes. At the time, the Imperial government army forces were fighting the Republic of Ezo in the Battle of Hakodate, and despite the proclamation, the city of Hakodate had not fallen yet. By end of June, 11 prefectures had been created, including Edo-fu.

In July and August 1869 during the abolition of the han system, the government issued hanseki hokan (版籍奉還) to the remaining Han, asking them to voluntarily return their domains, and later were ordered to by the Court, on threat of military action. The Daimyo who agreed to this were appointed as chihanji (知藩事; "domain governors"), who had to follow the laws and instructions of the central government.

Many territories that became the first prefectures were territories confiscated from domains in the Boshin War, especially domains part of the Ōuetsu Reppan Dōmei alliance.

Areas in Kanto did not initially receive a proper prefecture name and suffix, even though they had appointed officials for the areas.

=== Establishment of urban prefectures ===
When initially creating prefecture suffixes, the Seitaisho proclaimed all areas with a jōdai (castle minder), namely Osaka, Sunpu and Kyoto, the shoshidai or a bugyō were given the prefectural suffix fu, while any other area was designated ken. The first two urban prefectures (府, fu) were created on June 14, 1868: Kyoto-fu and Hakodate-fu. By the end of 1868, ten fu had been established: Kyoto, Hakodate, Osaka, Nagasaki, Edo (later Tokyo), Kanagawa, Watarai, Nara, Echigo (later Niigata) and Kōfu. Due to some prefectures gaining non-urban land or being amalgamated into other territories, in 1869 three remained: Kyoto-fu, Osaka-fu and Tokyo-fu. This remained the same until 1943, when Tokyo-fu and Tokyo-shi were merged to form Tokyo-to.

=== Aftermath ===
After three major merger/reorganization waves and many smaller mergers, splits and border changes between the initially >300 prefectures (down to 75 by 1872, to <40 in the late 1870s), they took generally their present forms in the 1890s. The last change involving an entire prefecture was the separation of Kagawa from Ehime in 1888, a very late large territorial change was the transfer of the Tama area from Kanagawa to Tokyo in 1893. (Comparatively smaller changes through cross-prefectural municipal mergers or transfers of single neighbourhoods, border corrections through land changes, etc. continue to the day.) After the 1871/72 mergers, prefectures are contiguous, compact territories resembling or even identical to the ritsuryō provinces in many places.

== Established prefectures ==
The prefectures (-fu/-ken) listed below were all established before the replacement of all domains (-han) with prefectures (-ken), i.e. under the fu/han/ken system. Disestablishment is only listed if prior to August 29, 1871, the time when all remaining domains were turned into prefectures. For the >300 prefectures immediately after that, look somewhere else. For the 75 prefectures after the 1871/72 wave of prefectural mergers, see the List of Japanese prefectures.

For a complete list of not only -fu/-ken, but all -fu/-han/-ken at two points in time, see the List of Japanese prefectures by population#1868 to 1871, it also indicates the (often disjoint) territorial extent of the prefectures and domains in this period by listing the provinces the prefectures/domains extended to and the number of exclaves.

=== Hokkaido and Tōhoku ===
Region	Establishment	Disestablishment	Notes
Hakodate-fu	June 14, 1868	August 15, 1869	Enlarged into Hakodate-ken on February 8, 1882, became part of Hokkaido on January 26, 1886.
Wakamatsu-ken (若松県)	June 13, 1869		
Mono'u-ken (桃生県)	August 27, 1869	October 22, 1870	Renamed Ishinomaki-ken (石巻県) on September 18, 1869. Absorbed into Fukushima.
Fukushima-ken	August 27, 1869		
Sakata-ken	September 2, 1869	October 17, 1870	Absorbed into Yamagata.
Kunohe-ken (九戸県)	September 12, 1869	December 30, 1869	Renamed Hachinohe-ken (八戸県) from October 17 to October 23, 1869, until the area was redrawn and amalgamated into Sannohe-ken (三戸県). Absorbed into Esashi.
Tome-ken (登米県)	September 12, 1869		
Esashi-ken (江刺県)	September 12, 1869		
Shiroishi-ken (白石県)	September 12, 1869		Amalgamated Kakuda on December 23, 1869.
Shirakawa-ken (白河県)	September 12, 1869		
Isawa-ken (胆沢県)	September 17, 1869		
Morioka-ken (盛岡県)	July 10, 1870		Established after the demise of the Morioka Domain

After the Daimyo of the northern domains were stripped of their social status in the Boshin War, the following Prefectures were created. These were mostly in name only, and did not function as proper entities.

Region	Establishment	Disestablishment	Notes
Hanamaki-ken (花巻県)	January 19, 1869	September 23, 1869	Former Morioka and Sendai Domains' area administered by the Matsumoto Domain. Absorbed into Esashi.
Morioka-ken	January 19, 1869	September 12, 1869	Former Morioka Domain area administered by Matsushiro Domain. Absorbed into Esashi. (different from Morioka-ken established in 1870)
Wakuya-ken (涌谷県)	January 19, 1869	September 12, 1869	Former Morioka Domain area administered by Tsuchiura Domain. Absorbed into Tome.
Koori-ken (桑折県)	January 19, 1869	August 27, 1869	Former area part of seven different domains, administered by Sōma Domain.
Kurihara-ken (栗原県)	February 4, 1869	September 12, 1869	Former Sendai Domain administered by the Utsunomiya Domain. Absorbed into Isawa.
Hokuō-ken (北奥県)	March 20, 1869	September 12, 1869	Former Morioka Domain administered by the Kurohane Domain. Absorbed into Kunohe.
Isawa-ken (伊沢県)	April 11, 1869	September 23, 1869	Former Morioka, Sendai and Ichinoseki Domains administered by the Maebashi Domain. Absorbed into Isawa (胆沢).

=== Kantō region ===
Region	Establishment	Disestablishment	Notes
Edo-fu (江戸府)	June 30, 1868		On September 3, 1868 renamed Tōkyō-fu (東京府)
Kanagawa-fu (神奈川府)	August 5, 1868		On November 5, 1868 renamed to its current name Kanagawa-ken (神奈川県)
Iwahana-ken (岩鼻県)	August 5, 1868		
Musashi Chikenji (武蔵知県事)	August 7, 1868		Renamed Ōmiya-ken (大宮県) on March 10, 1869. Split into Urawa-ken (浦和県) on November 2, 1869.
Musashi Chikenji (武蔵知県事)	August 17, 1868		Split into Shinagawa-ken (品川県) on March 21, 1869.
Musashi Chikenji (武蔵知県事)	August 27, 1868		Split into Kosuge-ken (小菅県) on February 23, 1869.
Hitachi Chikenji (常陸知県事)	August 15, 1868		Renamed Wakamori-ken (若森県) on March 21, 1869.
Kazusa Awa Chikenshi (安房上総知県事)	August 19, 1868		Renamed Miyazaku-ken (宮谷県) on March 21, 1869.
Shimōsa Chikenji (下総知県事)	September 23, 1868		On February 23, 1868 renamed Katsushika-ken (葛飾県)
Mooka Chikenji (真岡知県事)	July 12, 1868		Amalgamated into Nikkō-ken (日光県) on March 27, 1869.

=== Chūbu region ===
Region	Establishment	Disestablishment	Notes
Kasamatsu-ken (笠松県)	June 15, 1868		South part of Gifu
Hida-ken (飛騨県)	July 12, 1868		Renamed Takayama-ken (高山県) on July 21, 1868
Echigo-fu (越後府) (first)	July 18, 1868	September 3, 1869	Renamed Niigata-fu on November 5, 1868. Renamed Niigata-ken (first) on April 3, 1869.
Mikawa-ken (三河県)	July 28, 1868	August 1, 1869	Absorbed into Ina in 1869.
Nirayama-ken (韮山県)	August 17, 1868		
Kashiwayama-ken (柏崎県) (first)	September 13, 1868	December 18, 1869	Separated from Echigo-fu, later added to Niigata-fu.
Ina-ken (伊那県)	September 17, 1868		Renamed Nagano in 1870.
Sado-ken (佐渡県)	October 17, 1868		Incorporated into Niigata-fu on December 18, 1868. During the split of Echigo-fu on August 30, 1869, became a prefecture again. Renamed Aikawa-ken (相川県) in 1871, merged into Niigata Prefecture in 1876.
Fuchū-ken (府中県)	October 19, 1868	December 11, 1869	Merged into Kai-fu
Ichikawa-ken (市川県)	October 19, 1868	December 11, 1869	Merged into Kai-fu
Isawa-ken (石和県)	October 19, 1868	December 11, 1869	Merged into Kai-fu
Kai-fu (甲斐府)	December 11, 1868		Renamed Kai-ken on August 27, 1868. Renamed Yamanashi Prefecture in 1871.
Echigo-fu (second)	March 20, 1869	September 3, 1869	Re-established after the split of Niigata-fu.
Suibara-ken (水原県)	September 3, 1869		Established after joining Echigo-fu and Niigata-ken. Merged and renamed as Niigata Prefecture (second) on April 7, 1870.
Kashiwayama-ken (second)	September 30, 1869		Re-established after splitting from Suibara-ken.
Nakano-ken (中野県)	October 11, 1870		Established after splitting from Ina. Borders redrawn and renamed Nagano Prefecture on August 8, 1871.
Hombo-ken (本保県)	February 11, 1871		

=== Kansai region ===
Region	Establishment	Disestablishment	Notes
Kyoto-fu	June 14, 1868		
Ōtsu-ken (大津県)	June 15, 1868		Renamed Shiga in 1872.
Osaka-fu	June 21, 1868		
Kumihama-ken (久美浜県)	June 28, 1868		Areas split into Ikuno-ken in 1969, merged into Toyooka-ken in 1871.
Nara-ken	July 8, 1868		Renamed Nara-fu on September 15, 1868. On August 24, 1869, name changed back to Nara-ken.
Hyōgo-ken	July 12, 1868		
Sakai-ken (堺県)	August 10, 1868		Merged into Osaka-fu in 1881.
Watarai-fu (度会府)	August 23, 1868		On August 24, 1869 renamed Watari-ken.
Settsu-ken (摂津県)	March 2, 1869	September 7, 1869	Renamed Toyosaki-ken (豊崎県) on June 19, 1869. Merged into Hyōgo-ken in 1869, later merged into Osaka-fu in 1871.
Kawachi-ken (河内県)	March 2, 1869	September 7, 1869	Merged into Sakai-ken.
Ikuno-ken (生野県)	September 15, 1869		
Gojō-ken (五條県)	March 28, 1870		

=== Chūgoku region, Shikoku ===
Region	Establishment	Disestablishment	Notes
Kurashiki-ken (倉敷県)	July 15, 1868		Split into Fukatsu-ken, Hiroshima-ken and Tsuyama-ken (currently Kagawa-ken).
Oki-ken (隠岐県)	April 6, 1869		Territory rearranged into Ōmori-ken (大森県) on September 7, 1869. Rearranged again into Hamada-ken (浜田県) on February 9, 1870.

=== Kyushu ===
Region	Establishment	Disestablishment	Notes
Tomioka-ken (富岡県)	June 15, 1868	October 14, 1868	Renamed Amakusa-ken (天草県) on July 29, 1868. Merged into Nagasaki-fu.
Hita-ken (日田県)	June 15, 1868		
Tomidaka-ken (富高県)	June 15, 1868	October 2, 1868	Merged into Hita-ken.
Nagasaki-fu	June 23, 1868		Renamed Nagasaki-ken on July 28, 1869.
