= Komagatani Station =

Railway station in Habikino, Osaka Prefecture, Japan

Komagatani Station 駒ヶ谷駅
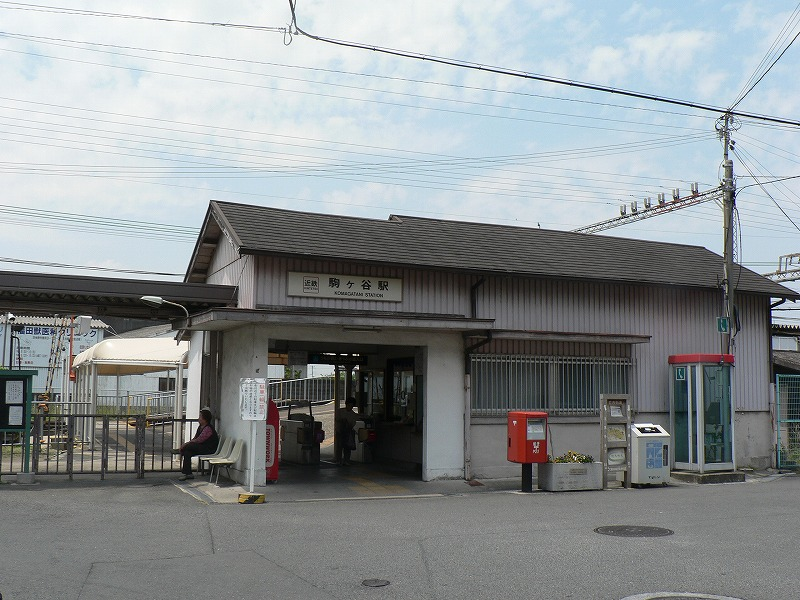
- Komagatani Station, June 2007

General information
- Location: 159-2, Komagatani, Habikino-shi, Osaka-fu 583-0841; Japan
- Coordinates: 34°32′44″N 135°37′21″E
- Operator: Kintetsu Railway
- Line: Minami Osaka Line
- Distance: 20.0 km (12.4 miles) from Ōsaka Abenobashi
- Platforms: 2 side platforms
- Connections

Other information
- Station code: F17
- Website: Official website

History
- Opened: March 29, 1929; 97 years ago

Passengers
- FY2019: 1417 daily

Services
Preceding station	Kintetsu Railway	Following station
Furuichi towards Ōsaka Abenobashi	Minami Osaka Line Local Semi-Express	Kaminotaishi towards Kashiharajingū-mae
Location
- Location within Osaka Prefecture Location within Japan

Komagatani Station (駒ヶ谷駅, Komagatani-eki) is a passenger railway station in located in the city of Habikino, Osaka Prefecture, Japan, operated by the private railway operator Kintetsu Railway.

== Lines ==
Komagatani Station is served by the Minami Osaka Line, and is located 20.0 rail kilometers from the starting point of the line at Ōsaka Abenobashi Station.

== Station layout ==
The station consists of two opposed side platforms connected by a level crossing.

=== Platforms ===
1	■ Minami Osaka Line	for Kashiharajingū-mae, Yoshino, and Gose
2	■ Minami Osaka Line	for Furuichi and Ōsaka Abenobashi

== History ==
Komagatani Station opened on March 29, 1929.

== Passenger statistics ==
In fiscal 2018, the station was used by an average of 1,417 passengers daily.

== Surrounding area ==
- Habikino City Komagatani Elementary School
- Choya Umeshu Headquarters
- Osaka Prefectural Kaifukan High School

== See also ==
- List of railway stations in Japan
