= Kurohimeyama Kofun =

- 黒姫山古墳 (Japanese)
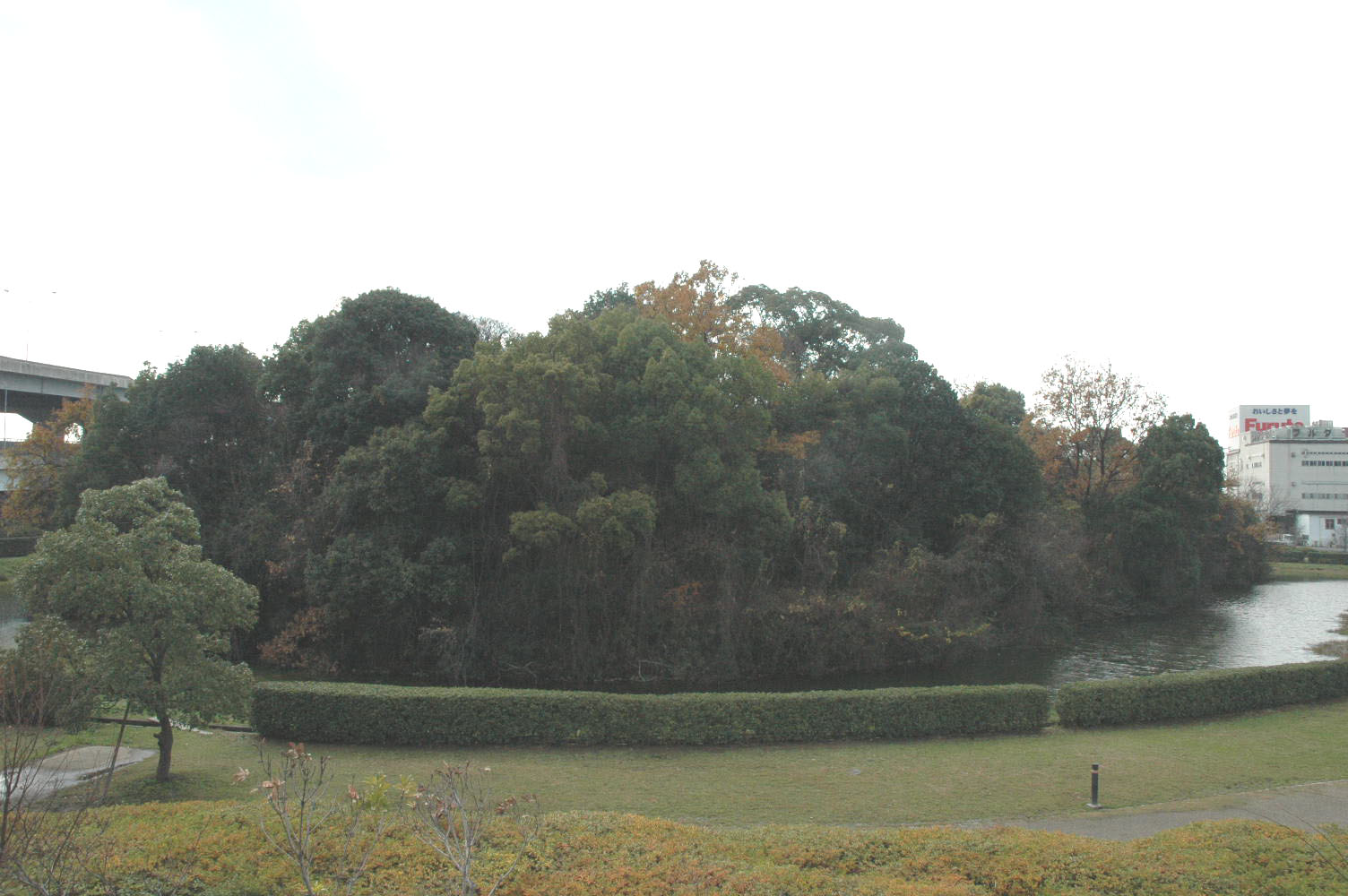
- Kurohimeyama Kofun, posterior portion with moat

- Kurohimeyama Kofun Kurohimeyama Kofun (Japan)
- Interactive map of Kurohimeyama Kofun
- 34°32′44.21″N 135°33′27.53″E
- Type: Kofun
- Periods: Kofun period
- Location: Mihara-ku, Sakai, Osaka, Japan
- Region: Kansai region

History
- Built: c.5th century

Site notes
- Public access: Yes (no facilities)

The Kurohimeyama Kofun (黒姫山古墳) is a Kofun period keyhole-shaped burial mound, located in Mihara ward of the city of Sakai, Osaka in the Kansai region of Japan. The tumulus was designated a National Historic Site of Japan in 1957 with the area under protection expanded in 1978.

== Overview ==
The Kurohimeyama Kofun is a zenpō-kōen-fun (前方後円墳), which is shaped like a keyhole, having one square end and one circular end, when viewed from above. It is located in the wide flat land of the Minamikawachi region between the Furuichi Kofun Cluster and the Furuichi Kofun Cluster. The tumulus has a total length of 73 meters, with a 43-meter diameter posterior circular portion, and is orientated to the west. It was once covered in fukiishi and had rows of cylindrical haniwa. There was a ceremonial platform extending off of the northern edge of the central constriction and the tumulus was surrounded by a moat with a width of 15 meters and depth of two meters. The tumulus is believed to have been associated with the Tajihi clan, a powerful tribe which controlled this area around the mid-fifth century.

In 1946, a pit-type stone burial chamber was detected in the anterior rectangular portion, and this was first excavated in 1947, with five more excavations occurring between 1948 and 2000. Finds included 359 cylindrical haniwa, each measuring 80 centimeters in height by 40 centimeters in diameter, with a slightly recessed bottom. In addition, 25 or more lid-shaped haniwa at intervals between the cylindrical haniwa. From within the burial chamber, 24 sets of armor were found, mounted in an upright position in two rows. This is the largest number of sets of armor found at any site in Japan. In addition, there were 24 iron swords, 9 iron spearheads, 6 iron stakes, 56 iron arrowheads, and 5 knives, along with other items. The burial chamber itself was four meters long and was covered by eight sandstone blocks forming the ceiling, and river stones to provide drainage on the floor. The burial chamber which was presumed to have existed in the posterior circular mound was apparently robbed in antiquity, and there is no trace remaining.

The shape of the tumulus was modified when it was used as a fortification in the Sengoku period, by cutting away the sides to make the slope steeper.

From 1989 the tumulus and its surroundings have been maintained as the Kurohimeyama Tumulus historical plaza, and the pit-type stone burial chamber on the east side of the tumulus and a part of the cylindrical haniwa row in the upper part of the burial mound have been restored. Artifacts excavated from the tumulus are displayed at the Sakai Historical Museum.

The tumulus is about a ten-minute walk from Kawachi-Matsubara Station on the Kintetsu Minami Osaka Line.

Total length
114 meters:
Anterior rectangular portion
65 meters wide x 11.5 meters high, 2-tier
Posterior circular portion
64 meter diameter x 11 meters high, 2-tiers

== Gallery ==
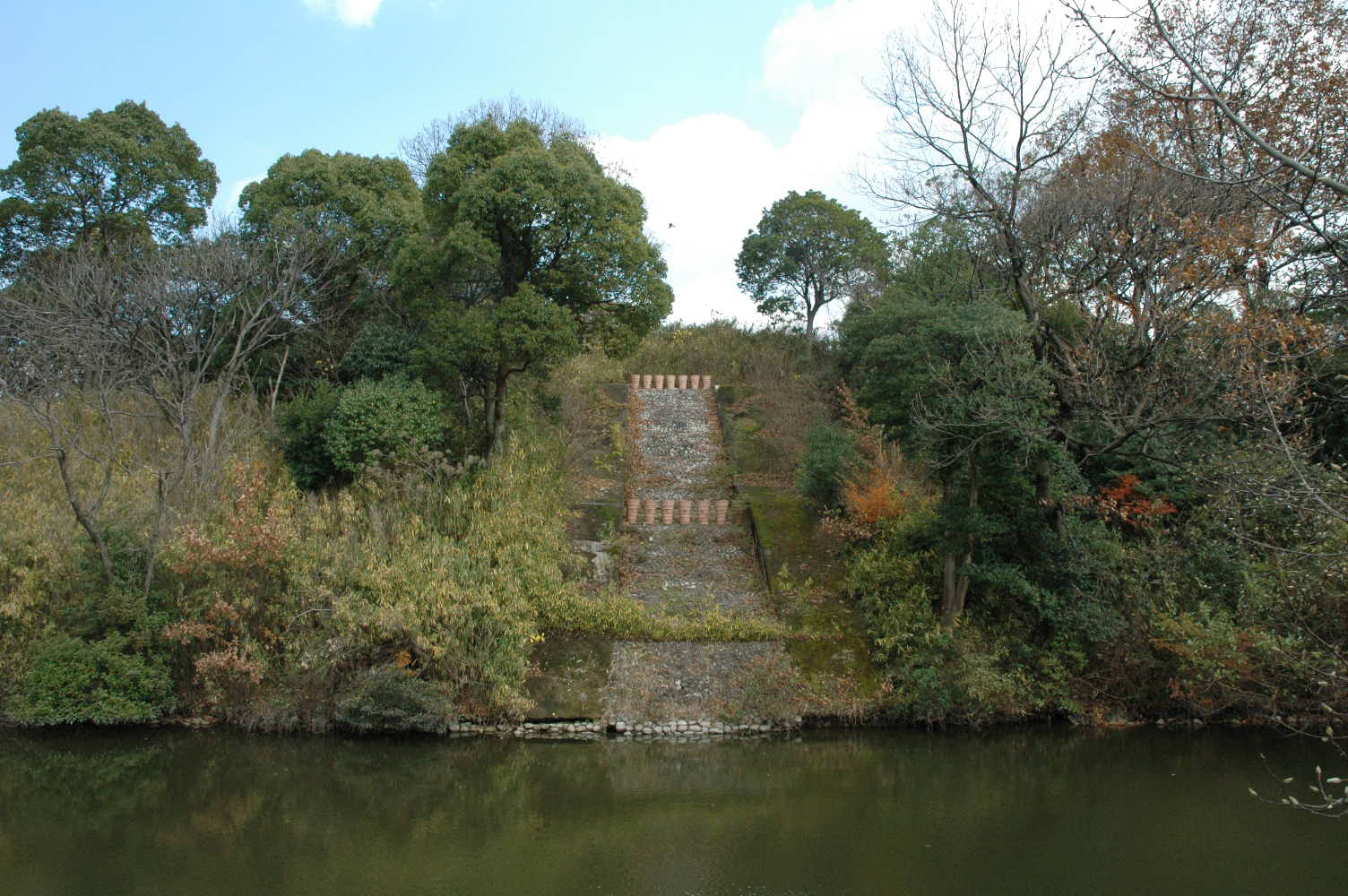
View from the west

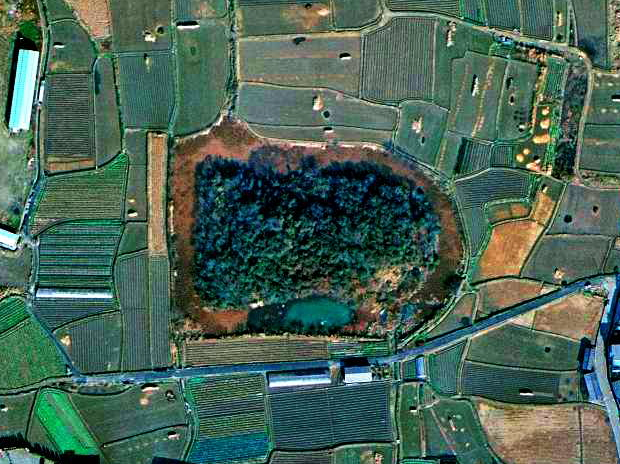
Aerial photograph taken in 1975.

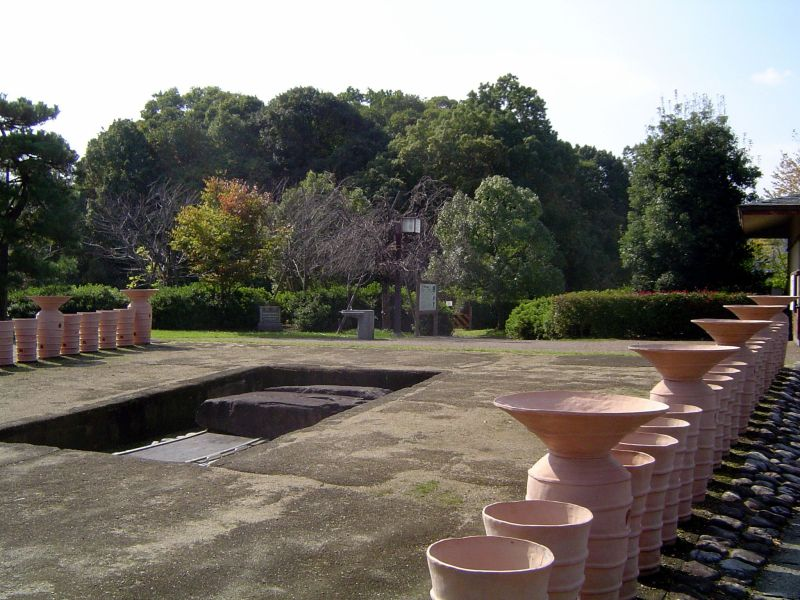
Top of the tumulus

== See also ==
- List of Historic Sites of Japan (Osaka)
