= 鹿谷 =

鹿谷 may refer to:

- Itsuki Shikatani (鹿谷 樹), character in the web manga Yarichin Bitch Club
- Lugu, Nantou, Taiwan
- Megumi Kanoya (鹿谷 愛), character in the manga Ouran High School Host Club
- Rokutan-ji temple, ancient ruined cave-temple
- Uiba Shikatani (鹿谷 初葉), character in the manga Muka Muka Paradise
