= Taishi, Osaka =

Taishi 太子町
- Town
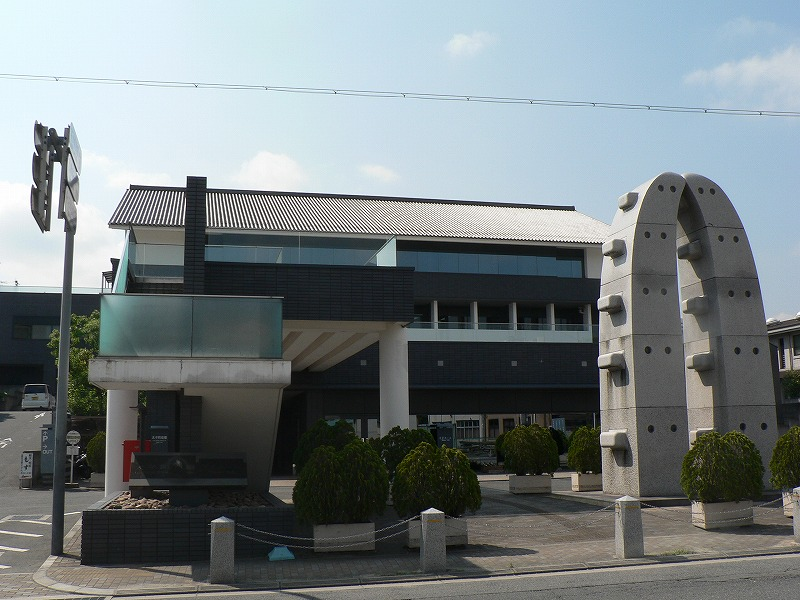
- Taishi Town Office

- Flag Seal

- Location of Taishi in Osaka Prefecture

- Location in Japan
- Coordinates: 34°31′N 135°39′E
- Country: Japan
- Region: Kansai; Kinki
- Prefecture: Osaka
- District: Minamikawachi

Government
  - Mayor: Yuji Tanaka

Area
  - Total: 14.17 km^{2} (5.47 sq mi)

Population (March 1, 2022)
  - Total: 12,755
  - Density: 900.1/km^{2} (2,331/sq mi)
- Time zone: UTC+09:00 (JST)
- City hall address: 88 Yamada, Taishi-cho, Minamikawachi-gun, Osaka-fu 583-8580
- Website: Official website
- Symbols
- Flower: Rhododendron indicum
- Tree: Cinnamomum camphora

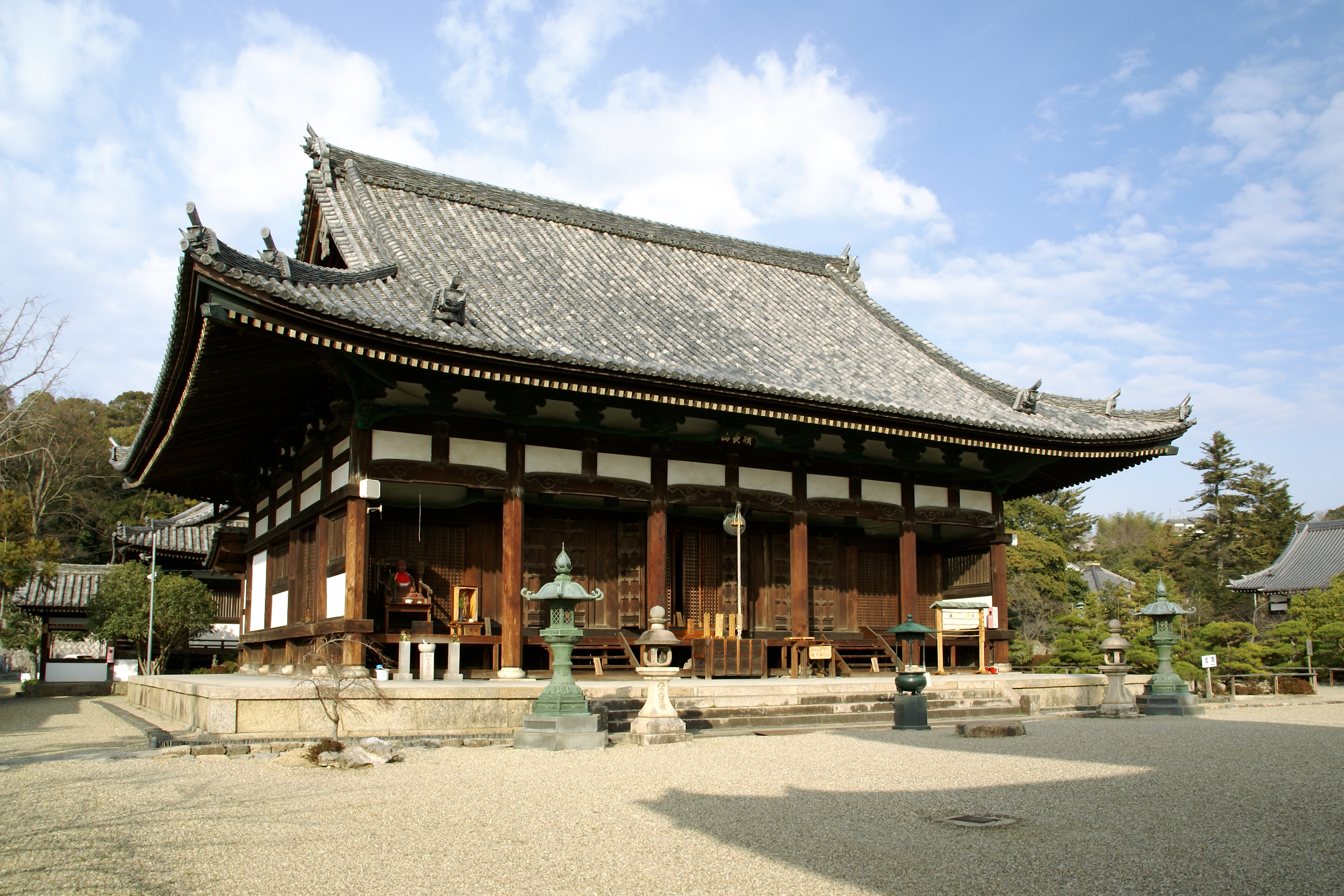
Eifuku-ji Kondo

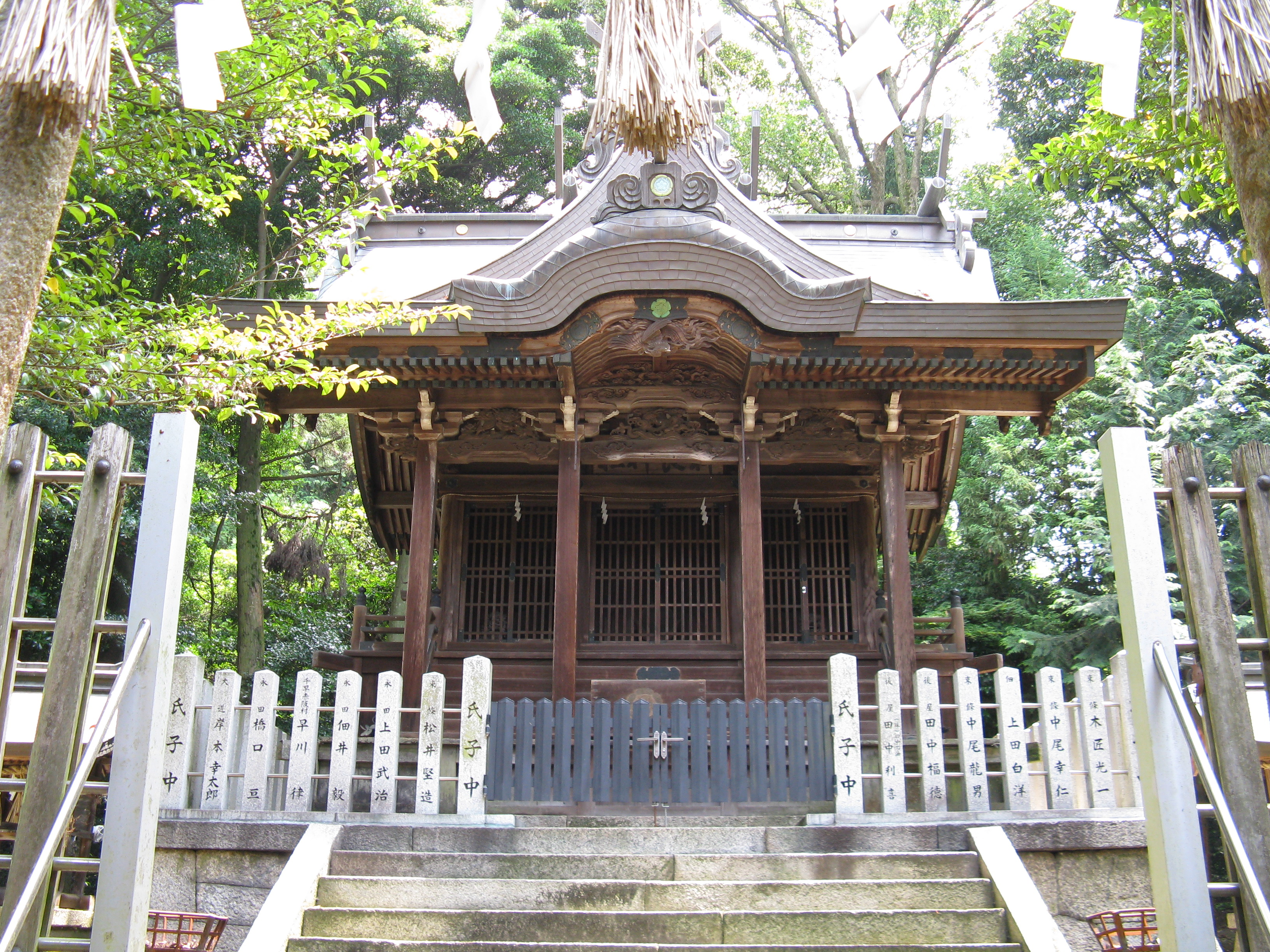
Shinaga Jinja

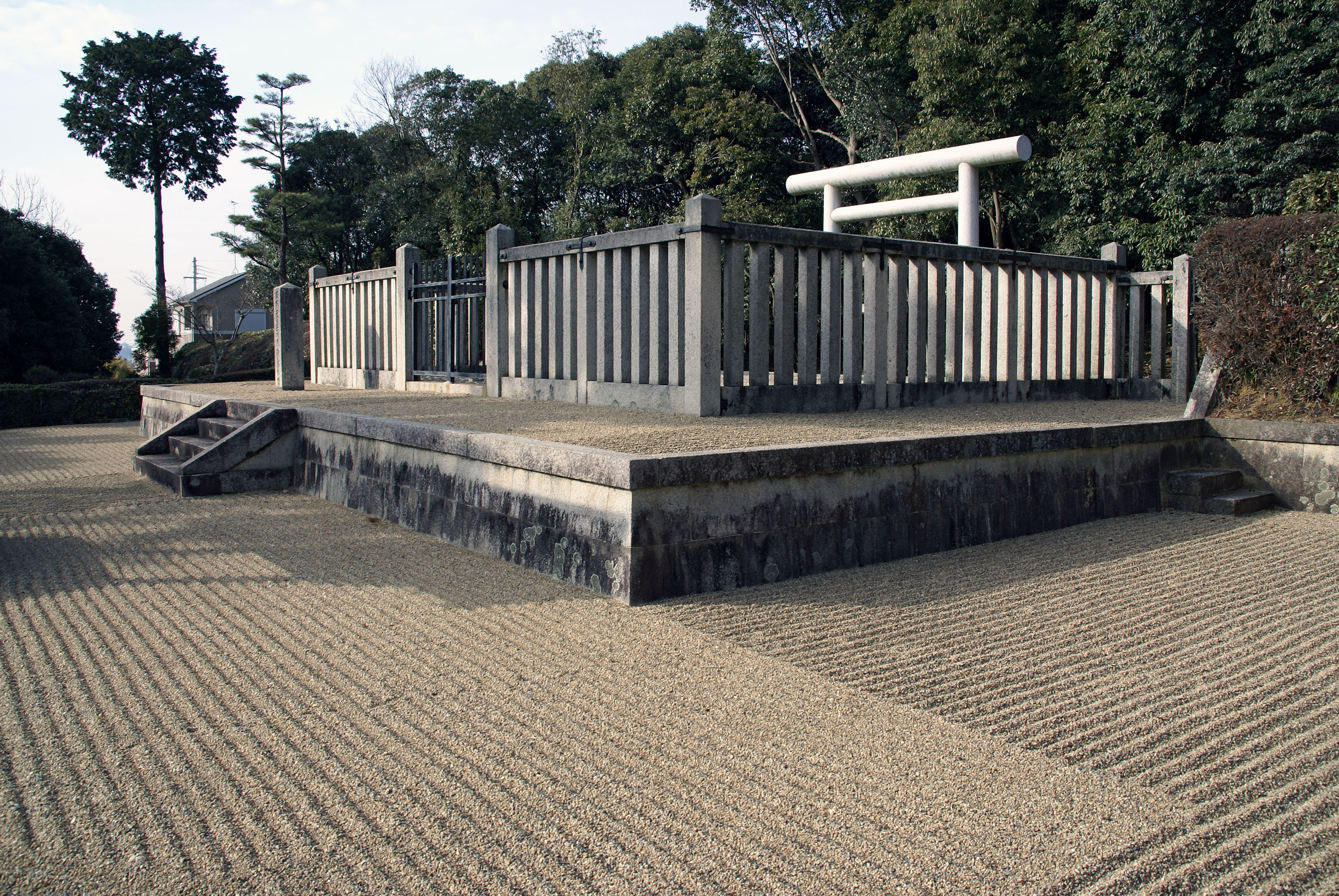
Grave of Emperor Yōmei

Taishi (太子町, Taishi-chō) is a town located in Minamikawachi District, Osaka Prefecture, Japan. As of 1 April 2021, the town had an estimated population of 13,172 in 5572 households and a population density of 930 persons per km^{2}. The total area of the town is 14.17 square kilometres (5.47 sq mi).

== Geography ==
Taishi is located in the southeastern part of Osaka Prefecture on the west side of Kongō Range and Katsuragi Mountains which separate Osaka from Nara Prefecture. The town is dominated by the peaks of Mount Nijō to the east.

=== Neighboring municipalities ===
Nara Prefecture

- Kashiba
- Katsuragi

Osaka Prefecture

- Habikino
- Kanan
- Tondabayashi

== Climate ==
Taishi has a humid subtropical climate (Köppen Cfa) characterized by warm summers and cool winters with light to no snowfall. The average annual temperature in Taishi is 14.2 °C. The average annual rainfall is 1636 mm with September as the wettest month. The temperatures are highest on average in August, at around 26.3 °C, and lowest in January, at around 2.7 °C.

== Demographics ==
Per Japanese census data, the population of Taishi has increased steadily since the 1970s.

Historical population
Year	Pop.	±%
1920	4,110	—
1930	4,401	+7.1%
1940	4,718	+7.2%
1950	6,083	+28.9%
1960	5,970	−1.9%
1970	6,374	+6.8%
1980	8,741	+37.1%
1990	10,802	+23.6%
2000	14,190	+31.4%
2010	14,215	+0.2%

== History ==
The area of the modern town of Taishi was within ancient Kawachi Province. The area has been inhabited since the Japanese Paleolithic, due to the abundance of raw materials for stone tools from Mount Nijō. During the Asuka period, the Takeuchi Kaido, one of Japan's first "official roads", which connected the port of Sakai with Yamato Province was constructed. It was used by Ono no Imoko and others during the Japanese missions to Sui China. Around this time, Yamato's Asuka was called "Far Asuka", while the area around Taishi Town was called "Nearby Asuka". The town has many imperial tombs, including that of Emperor Bidatsu, Emperor Yōmei, Empress Suiko, and Prince Shotoku.

The villages of Isonaga and Yamada were established within Ishikawa District with the creation of the modern municipalities system on April 1, 1889. On April 1, 1896 the area became part of Minamikawachi District, Osaka. The two villages merged on September 30, 1956 to form the town of Taishi, which was named after Prince Shotoku.

== Government ==
Taishi has a mayor-council form of government with a directly elected mayor and a unicameral city council of 11 members. Taishi collectively with the cities of Tondabayashi and Ōsakasayama, and other municipalities of Minamikawachi District contributes two members to the Osaka Prefectural Assembly. In terms of national politics, the town is part of Osaka 15th district of the lower house of the Diet of Japan.

== Economy ==
Taishi was traditionally dependent on agriculture and forestry.

== Education ==
Taishi has two public elementary schools and one public middle schools operated by the town government. The town does not have and a public high school; however, there is one private high school.

== Transportation ==
=== Railway ===
Although the Kintetsu Railway Minami Osaka Line passes through the town, there is no passenger railway service. The nearest train station is Kaminotaishi Station in neighboring Habikino or Kishi Station in Tondabayashi.

=== Highways ===
- Minami-Hanna Road
- National Route 166

== Local attractions ==
- Eifuku-ji, Buddhist temple associated with Prince Shotoku
- Futagozuka Kofun, a National Historic Site
- Iwaya, a National Historic Site
- Grave of Emperor Bidatsu
- Grave of Emperor Yōmei
- Grave of Empress Suiko
- Grave of Prince Shotoku
- Rokutan-ji temple ruins, a National Historic Site
- Shinaga Jinja, with grave of Ono no Imoko
