= Rokutan-ji =

Ancient temple in Osaka, Japan

Rokutan-ji temple ruins
- 鹿谷寺跡 (Japanese)
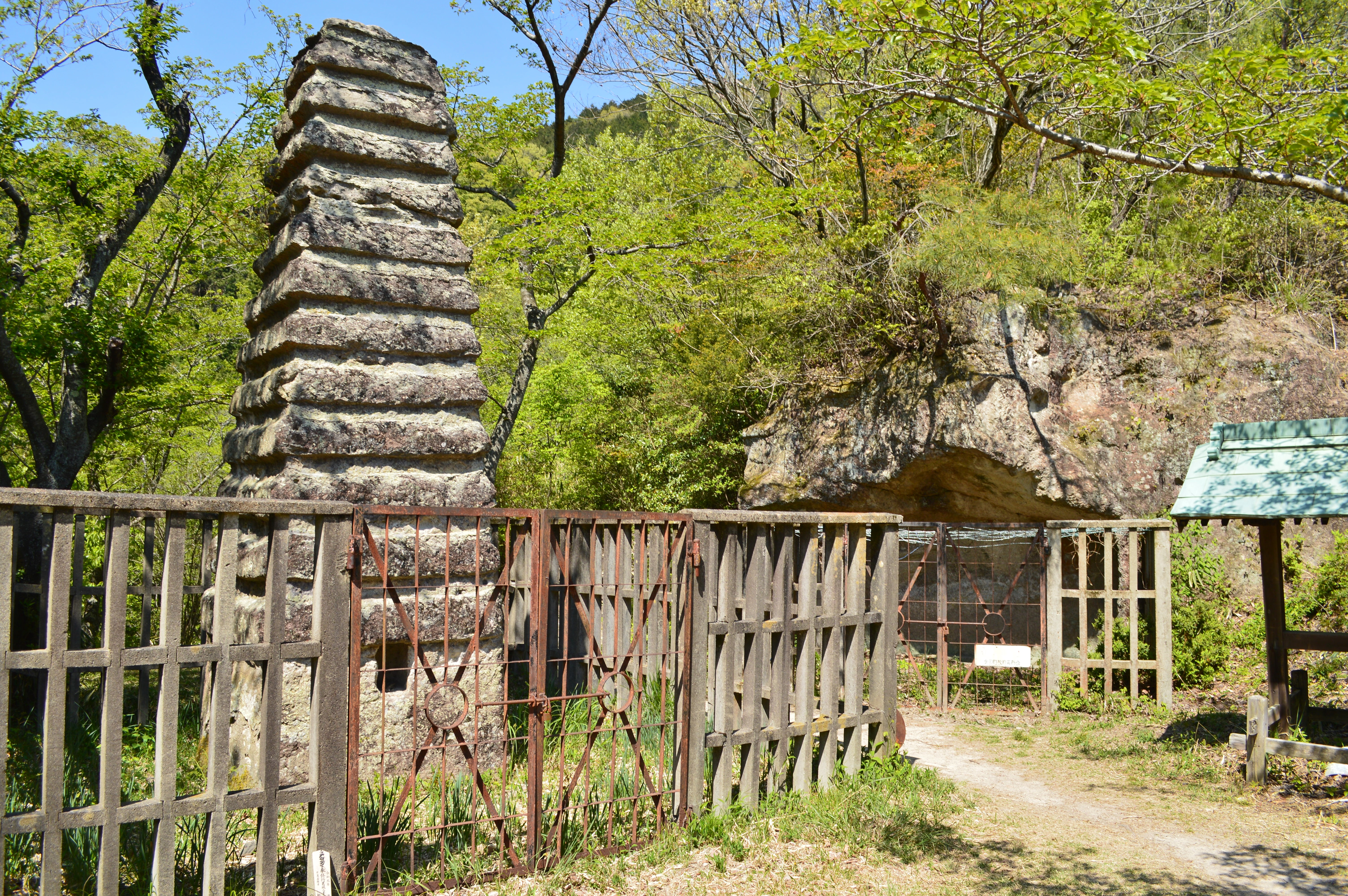
- Rokutan-ji temple ruins

- Rokutan-ji temple ruins Rokutan-ji (Japan)
- Interactive map of Rokutan-ji temple ruins
- 34°31′12″N 135°40′19″E
- Periods: Heian period
- Location: Taishi, Osaka, Japan
- Region: Kansai region

Site notes
- Public access: Yes (no facilities)

The Rokutan-ji temple ruins (鹿谷寺跡) is an ancient ruined cave-temple located in the Yamada neighborhood of the town of Taishi, Minamikawachi District, Osaka in the Kansai region of Japan. The site was designated a National Historic Site of Japan in 1948.

== Overview ==
The Rokutan-ji temple ruins are located on a small flat land at an elevation of 258 meters near the tip of a hill that is derived from Mount Nijō in the southwest direction, to the west of the Iwaya ruins. The flat ground of the temple ruins was made by carving away the tuff of the mountain, leaving behind a pillar of stone which was carved into thirteen-storied pagoda on the north side. Although the upper portion is damaged, it is 5.7 meters high. An image of Buddha is also embossed on the western rock wall, but is in very poor preservation, protected by an artificial shallow cave measuring 2.2 meters wide by 1.8 meters high by 0.7 meters deep. Below the southern cliff, a small tower with a height of about 1.5 meters was built from the ground, facing the cliff.

The cave-temple is located along the route of the Takenouchi Kaido, an ancient highway which connected Asuka and Yamato Province with the seacoast of Osaka Bay. This was the route taken by the Japanese missions to Imperial China during the Asuka and Nara periods, and this type of cave-temple was common on the Asian continent, but was very rare for Japan. There is no documentary record of when Rokutan-ji was made, but it is believed to have been founded in the first half of the 9th century.

== See also ==
- List of Historic Sites of Japan (Osaka)
