= Konda Hakuchō Haniwa Production Site =

- 誉田白鳥埴輪製作遺跡 (Japanese)
- Konda Hakuchō Haniwa Production Site Konda Hakuchō Haniwa Production Site (Japan)
- Interactive map of Konda Hakuchō Haniwa Production Site
- 34°33′25″N 135°36′26″E
- Periods: Kofun period
- Location: Habikino, Osaka Japan
- Region: Kansai region

History
- Built: 5th century to the 6th century AD

Site notes
- Public access: Yes (public park)

The Konda Hakuchō Haniwa Production Site (誉田白鳥埴輪製作遺跡, Konda Hakuchō haniwa seisaku iseki) is an archaeological site with the ruins of a Kofun period factory for the production of haniwa clay funerary pottery, located in what is now the Hakucho neighborhood of the city of Habikino in Osaka Prefecture in the Kansai region of Japan. It received protection as a National Historic Site in 1973, with the area under protection expanded in 1975.

== Overview ==
The Konda Hakuchō site is located in between the Konda Mitoyama Kofun (tomb of Emperor Ōjin) and the Hakayama Kofun in the Furuichi Kofun Cluster, and was the location where the thousands of haniwa used in these, and other burial mounds in the area. The kilns are divided into two groups, with a total of eleven kiln thus far located. Each has a width of about 1.5 meters, length of about 7 meters, and is at an inclination of about 12 degrees on the slope of a hill. Only a part of each base, the fire mouth, flue and the ash field have survived. Most of the artifacts found are cylindrical haniwa pieces, but figurative haniwa pieces of various types have also been found. Nearby. the foundation pillars of several raised-floor buildings in orderly rows were found. It is possible that into the Nara period, when haniwa were no longer being produced, the site became the location of the district office for ancient Furuichi District. The remains of a Haji ware workshop from the Nara period have also been found. At present, the site is now an archaeological park with one of the kilns restored to its original appearance.

The site is about a 10-minute walk from Furuichi Station on the Kintetsu Railway Minami Osaka Line.

== See also ==
- List of Historic Sites of Japan (Osaka)
