= Japan National Route 166 =

National highway in Japan

National Route 166
- 国道166号
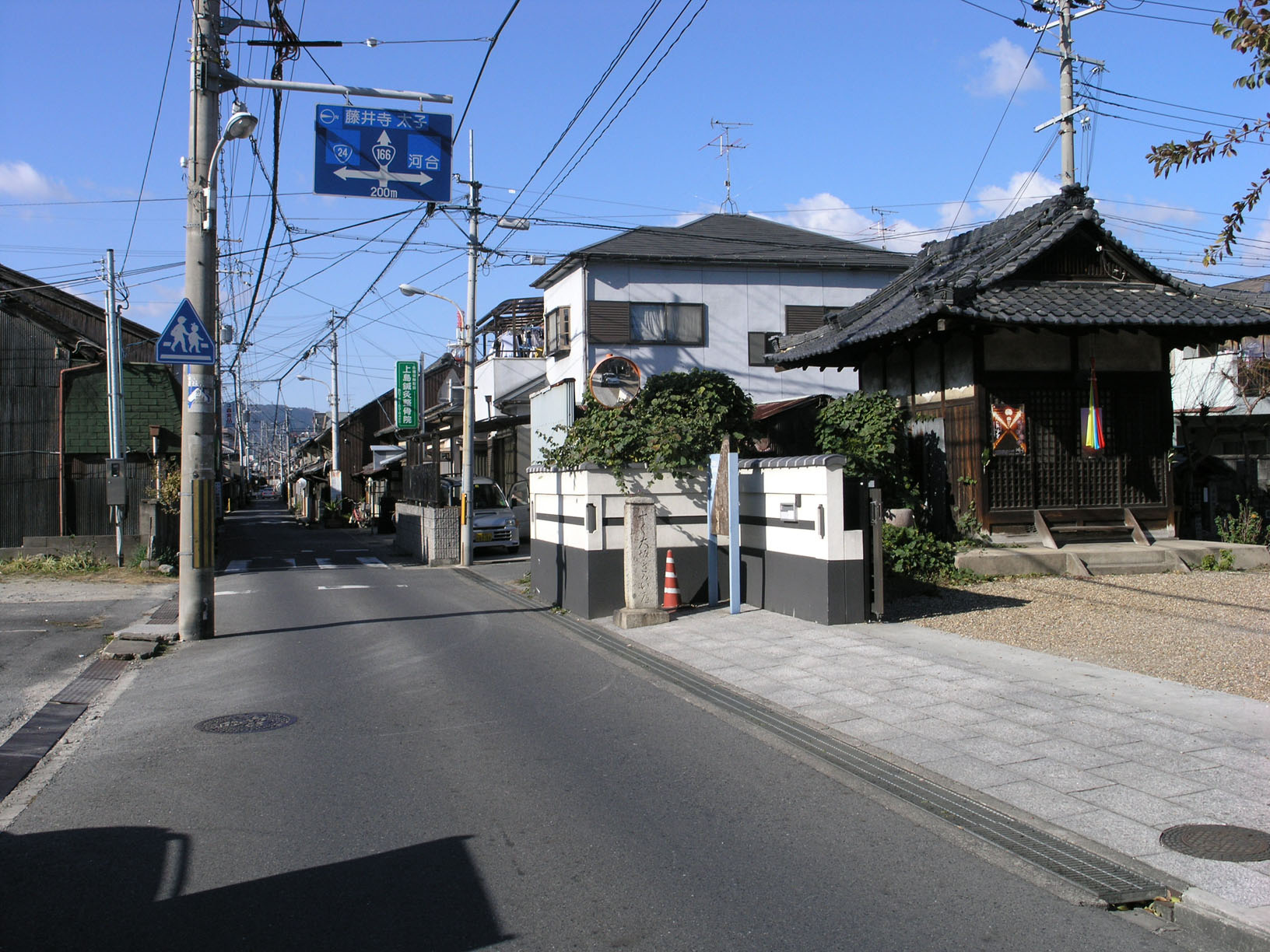

Route information
- Length: 125.4 km (77.9 mi)
- Existed: 18 May 1953–present

Major junctions
- West end: National Route 170 in Habikino, Osaka
- East end: National Route 23 in Matsusaka, Mie

Location
- Country: Japan

Highway system
- National highways of Japan; Expressways of Japan
| ← National Route 165 | → National Route 167 |

National Route 166 is a national highway of Japan connecting Habikino, Osaka and Matsusaka, Mie in Japan, with a total length of 125.4 km (77.92 mi).
