= Kaminotaishi Station =

Railway station in Habikino, Osaka Prefecture, Japan

Kaminotaishi Station 上ノ太子駅
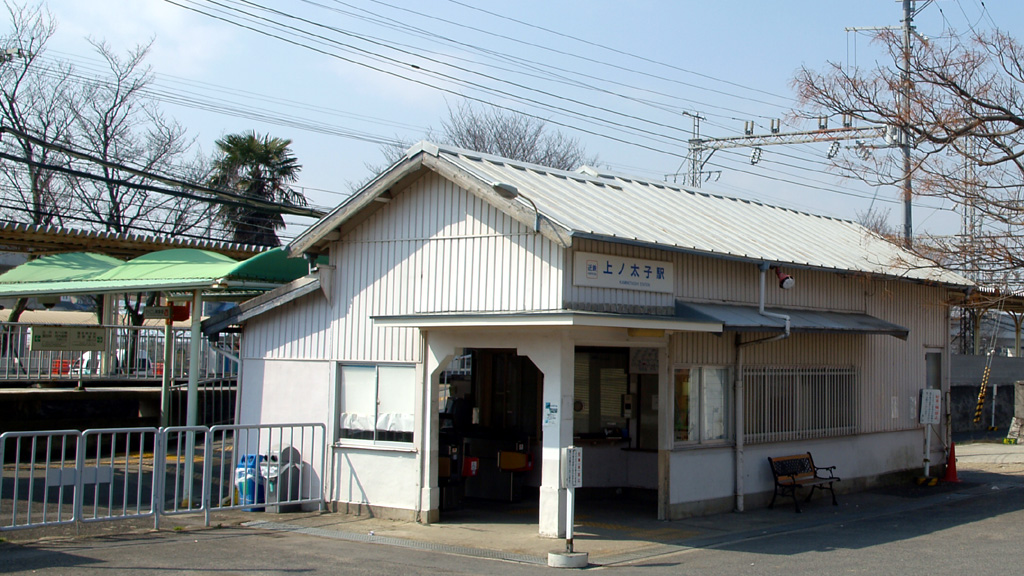
- Kaminotaishi Station, March 2007

General information
- Location: 811, Asuka, Habikino-shi, Osaka-fu 583-0842; Japan
- Coordinates: 34°31′59″N 135°38′17″E
- Operator: Kintetsu Railway
- Line: Minami Osaka Line
- Distance: 22.0 km from Ōsaka Abenobashi
- Platforms: 2 side platforms
- Connections: Bus routes Kongo Bus Taishi Line

Other information
- Station code: F18
- Website: Official website

History
- Opened: March 29, 1929; 97 years ago

Passengers
- FY2019: 4528 daily

Services
Preceding station	Kintetsu Railway	Following station
Komagatani towards Ōsaka Abenobashi	Minami Osaka Line Local Semi-Express	Nijōzan towards Kashiharajingū-mae
Location
- Location within Osaka Prefecture Location within Japan

Kaminotaishi Station (上ノ太子駅, Kaminotaishi-eki) is a passenger railway station in located in the city of Habikino, Osaka Prefecture, Japan, operated by the private railway operator Kintetsu Railway. The station is also the nearest station to the town of Taishi where no train station is located.

== Lines ==
Kaminotaishi Station is served by the Minami Osaka Line, and is located 22.0 rail kilometers from the starting point of the line at Ōsaka Abenobashi Station.

== Station layout ==
The station was consists of two opposed side platforms connected by a level crossing.

=== Platforms ===
1	■ Minami-Osaka Line	for Kashiharajingū-mae, Yoshino, and Gose
2	■ Minami-Osaka Line	for Furuichi and Ōsaka Abenobashi

== Additional services ==
Express trains stop at this station on weekends and national holidays in October and November every year for Mikan-gari or Mandarin orange eating.

== History ==
Kaminotaishi Station opened on March 29, 1929.

== Passenger statistics ==
In fiscal 2018, the station was used by an average of 4,528 passengers daily.

== Surrounding area ==
- Eifuku-ji (Kami no Taishi)
- Saiho-in
- Tomb of Ono no Imoko
- Tsuboi Hachiman Shrine
- Kaminotaishi Mikan Field

== See also ==
- List of railway stations in Japan
