= Mihara, Osaka =

Dissolved municipality in Ōsaka prefecture, Japan

Mihara (美原町, Mihara-chō) was a town located in Minamikawachi District, Osaka Prefecture, Japan.

As of 2003, the town had an estimated population of 38,956 and a density of 2,951.21 persons per km^{2}. The total area was 13.20 km^{2}.

On February 1, 2005, Mihara was merged into the expanded city of Sakai and now forms Mihara-ku within Sakai.
