= Habikino =

Habikino 羽曳野市
- City
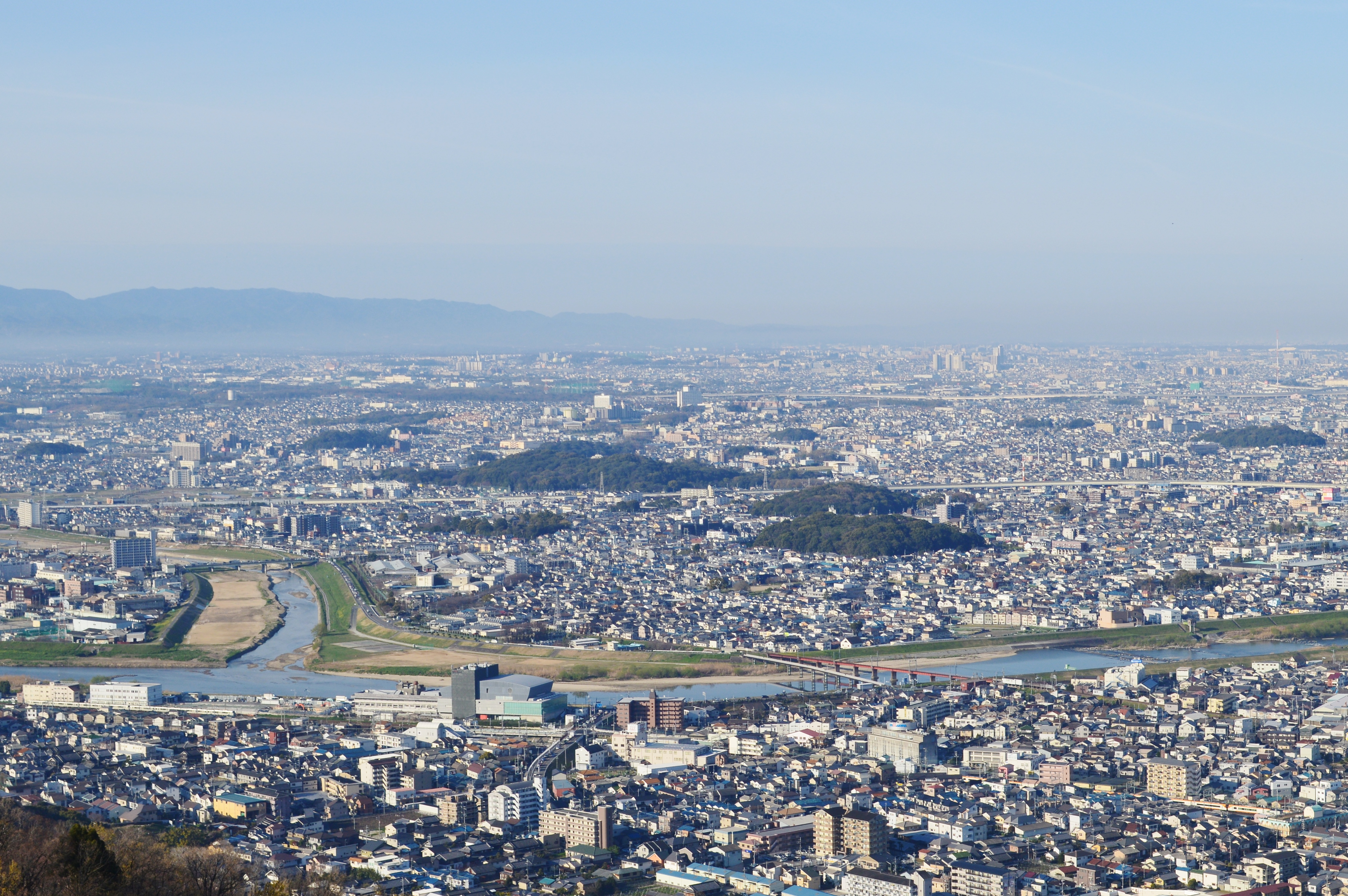
- Panoramic view of downtown Habikino and Furuichi tomb group heritage site

- Flag Emblem

- Location of Habikino in Osaka Prefecture

- Location in Japan
- Coordinates: 34°33′N 135°36′E
- Country: Japan
- Region: Kansai
- Prefecture: Osaka

Government
  - Mayor: Tsuguo Kitagawa

Area
  - Total: 26.45 km^{2} (10.21 sq mi)

Population (January 31, 2022)
  - Total: 109,479
  - Density: 4,139/km^{2} (10,720/sq mi)
- Time zone: UTC+09:00 (JST)
- City hall address: 4-1-1 Konda, Habikino-shi, Ōsaka-fu 583-8585
- Website: Official website
- Symbols
- Flower: Peach
- Tree: Mandarin orange

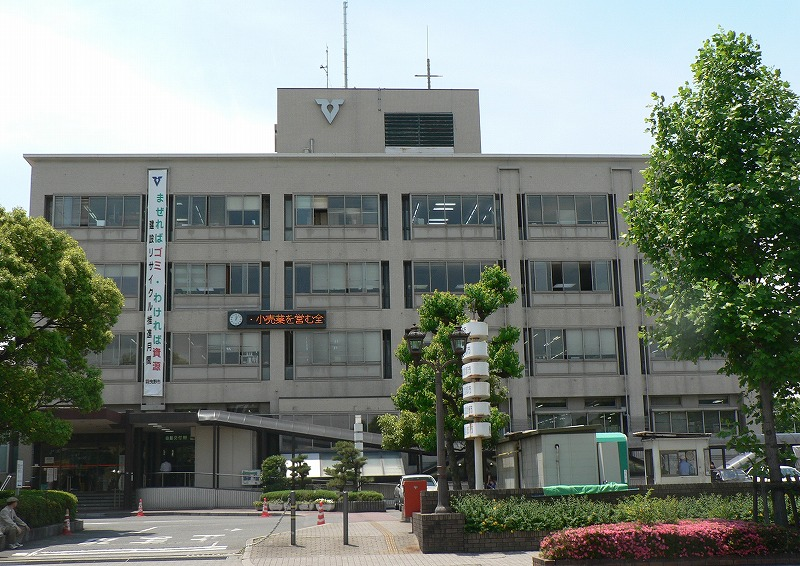
Habikino city office

Habikino (羽曳野市, Habikino-shi) is a Japanese city in Osaka Prefecture. As of 31 January 2022, the city had an estimated population of 109,479 in 50918 households and a population density of 4100 persons per km^{2}.

== Geography ==
Habikino is located in the southeastern part of Osaka Prefecture, in the Kawachi Plain surrounded by Ikoma, Kongō, and Katsuragi Mountains and Mount Nijō. It is within about 20 kilometers from the center of Osaka metropolis.

=== Neighboring municipalities ===
Nara Prefecture

- Kashiba

Osaka Prefecture

- Fujiidera
- Kashiwara
- Matsubara
- Sakai
- Taishi
- Tondabayashi

== Climate ==
Habikino has a humid subtropical climate (Köppen Cfa) characterized by warm summers and cool winters with light to no snowfall. The average annual temperature in Habikino is 14.2 °C. The average annual rainfall is 1475 mm with September as the wettest month. The temperatures are highest on average in August, at around 26.3 °C, and lowest in January, at around 2.7 °C.

== Demographics ==
Per Japanese census data, the population of Habikino increased rapidly from the 1960s through 1990s, and has leveled off since.

Historical population
Year	Pop.	±%
1960	36,982	—
1970	77,134	+108.6%
1980	103,181	+33.8%
1990	115,049	+11.5%
2000	119,264	+3.7%
2010	117,702	−1.3%

== History ==
The area of the modern city of Habikino was within ancient Kawachi Province and is located on the route of the Take-no-uchi Kaidō, a highway which connected the ancient capitals of Asuka and Heijō-kyō with the coast. Numerous kofun burial mounds were built in the area during the Kofun period, including many attributed to early Emperors. During the Heian period, the area was controlled by the Kawachi Genji clan, the ancestors of the Minamoto clan who dominated Japan during the Kamakura period.

After the Meiji restoration, the area became part of Osaka Prefecture from 1881. The villages of Furuichi, Imagatani, and Nishiura were created with the establishment of the modern municipalities system on April 1, 1889. On April 1, 1896 the area became part of Minamikawachi District, Osaka. Furuichi was elevated to town status on October 1, 1916. On September 30, 1956, Furuichi merged with the town of Takawashi and the villages of Nanyu, Nishiura, Imagatani, and Tanpi to form the town of Minami-Osaka (南大阪町). On April 1, 1957, Minami-Osaka annexed the neighboring village of Mihara. On January 15, 1959, Minami-Osaka was elevated to city status, and took the name of Habikino.

== Government ==
Habikino has a mayor-council form of government with a directly elected mayor and a unicameral city council of 18 members. Habikino contributes one member to the Osaka Prefectural Assembly. In terms of national politics, the city is part of Osaka 14th district of the lower house of the Diet of Japan.

== Education ==
=== Universities and technical schools ===
- Osaka Prefecture University Habikino Campus (formerly Osaka Prefecture College of Nursing)
- Shitennōji International Buddhist University

== Header ==
- Furuichi Kofun Cluster, a group of Kofun. They are recorded as World Heritage Sites.
- Honda Shiratori Haniwa Production Site, National Historic Site
- Kannonzuka Kofun, National Historic Site
- Tsūhō-ji ruins, National Historic Site
- Yachū-ji temple ruins, National Historic Site

== Sister cities ==
=== Within Japan ===
- (Japan) Kameyama, Mie, friendship city
- (Japan) Gose, Nara, friendship city

=== International ===
- Hietzing, Vienna, Austria, sister city

== Notable people ==
- Makate Asai, writer
- Yu Darvish, baseball player
- Ryohei Sakaguchi, racing driver
- Hiroki Uchi, idol singer, songwriter, actor and model
- Sayuri Uenishi, politician
