= Mihara-ku =

Ward of Sakai, Osaka Prefecture, Japan

Coordinates: 34°32′18.77″N 135°33′35.39″E

Mihara-ku in the city

Mihara-ku (美原区) is a ward of the city of Sakai in Osaka Prefecture, Japan. The ward has an area of 13.24 km^{2} and a population of 39,230. The population density is 2,960 per km^{2}.

The wards of Sakai were established when Sakai became a city designated by government ordinance on April 1, 2006.

This ward includes the former town of Mihara, which joined Sakai by merger on February 1, 2005.

== Sources ==
This article incorporates material from 美原区 (Mihara-ku) in the Japanese Wikipedia, retrieved on June 23, 2009.
