= Minamikawachi District, Osaka =

District in Ōsaka prefecture, Japan

Coordinates: 34°27′57″N 135°39′00″E

Location of Minamikawachi District in Osaka

Minamikawachi (南河内郡, Minamikawachi-gun) is a district located in Osaka Prefecture, Japan. In 2009 the district had an estimated population of 37,695 and a density of 491 persons per km^{2}. The total area is 76.81 km^{2}.

== Towns and villages ==
- Kanan
- Taishi
- Chihayaakasaka

== Mergers ==
- On February 1, 2005, the town of Mihara was merged into the city of Sakai.
- On March 1, 2008, the village of Chiahayaakasaka requested a merge into the adjacent city of Kawachinagano after talks of merging with the surrounding towns of Kanan and Taishi fell through. These plans also fell through as of August 14, 2009.

== Famous people ==
- Sasaki Mikirô (1947- ), poet and essayist
