= Kanan =

Kanan may refer to:

== People ==
=== Surname ===
- Sean Kanan, American actor and TV host

=== Given name ===
==== Male ====
- Kanan Gill (born 1989), Indian stand-up comedian, actor, and internet personality
- Kanan Karimov (born 1976), Azerbaijani Association football manager and former player
- Kanan Makiya (born 1949), Iraqi American professor and former dissident
- Kanan Malhotra, Indian model and television actor
- Kanan Nasibov (born 2004), Azerbaijani judoka
- Kanan Seyidov, Azerbaijani military officer
- Kanan Yusif-zada (born 1973), Azerbaijani surgeon, professor, and military administrator

==== Female ====
- Kanan Devi (1916-1992), Indian actress and singer
- Kanan Kaushal (born 1939), Indian actress
- Kanan Minami (born 1979), manga artist
- Kanan Mishra (1944–2015), Oriya writer

=== Pseudonym ===
- Pen name of Yūko Ōtsuki, illustrator of Galaxy Angel manga

=== Fictional characters ===
- Kanan, a character in the manga series, Saiyuki
- Kanan Jarrus, a character in the Star Wars franchise
- Kanan Matsuura, a character from the media-mix project, Love Live! Sunshine!!
- Kanan Stark, a character in the television series Power

== Places ==
- Kanan, Osaka, a town in Osaka Prefecture, Japan
- Kanan, Pori, a district in Pori, Finland
- Kanan, Khuzestan, a city in Karun County, Khuzestan province, Iran
- Kanan-e Olya, a village in West Azerbaijan province, Iran
- Kanan-e Sofla, a village in West Azerbaijan province, Iran
- Kanan-Bakache, a village and commune in Niger, West Africa
- Kanan, Myanmar, a village in Khampat, Sagaing Region, Myanmar

== Others ==
- Kanan (tigress)
- Kanan Road/Kanan Dume Road

== See also ==
- Jianan (disambiguation) or Chianan, the Chinese pronunciation of characters read Kanan in Japanese
- Kannan, an Indian name
  - Kannan (composer), Indian film music composer
- Way Kanan Regency, a regency in Lampung province, Indonesia
