= Kanan, Iran =

Kanan (Persian: كنعان) may refer to:

- Kanan-e Olya
- Kanan-e Sofla
