= Balestan =

Balestan (Persian: بالستان) may refer to:

- Balestan, East Azerbaijan
- Balestan, West Azerbaijan
