= Samartu =

Samartu ثمرتو
- Village
- Location within Iran
- Coordinates: 37°13′38″N 45°18′56″E
- Country: Iran
- Province: West Azerbaijan
- County: Urmia
- Bakhsh: Central
- Rural District: Dul

Population (2006)
  - Total: 372
- Time zone: UTC+3:30 (IRST)
  - Summer (DST): UTC+4:30 (IRDT)

Samartu (Persian: ثمرتو, also Romanized as S̄amartū) is a village in Dul Rural District, in the Central District of Urmia County, West Azerbaijan Province, Iran. At the 2006 census, its population was 372, in 108 families.
