= Jolbar =

Jolbar جلبر
- Village
- Location within Iran
- Coordinates: 37°10′45″N 45°21′56″E
- Country: Iran
- Province: West Azerbaijan
- County: Urmia
- Bakhsh: Central
- Rural District: Dul

Population (2006)
  - Total: 330
- Time zone: UTC+3:30 (IRST)
  - Summer (DST): UTC+4:30 (IRDT)

Jolbar (Persian: جلبر) is a village in Dul Rural District, in the Central District of Urmia County, West Azerbaijan Province, Iran. At the 2006 census, its population was 330, in 84 families.
