= List of cities in Osaka Prefecture by population =

The following list sorts all cities (including towns) in the Japanese prefecture of Osaka with a population of more than 10,000 according to the 2020 Census. As of October 1, 2020, 40 places fulfill this criterion and are listed here. This list refers only to the population of individual cities, towns and villages within their defined limits, which does not include other municipalities or suburban areas within urban agglomerations.

== List ==
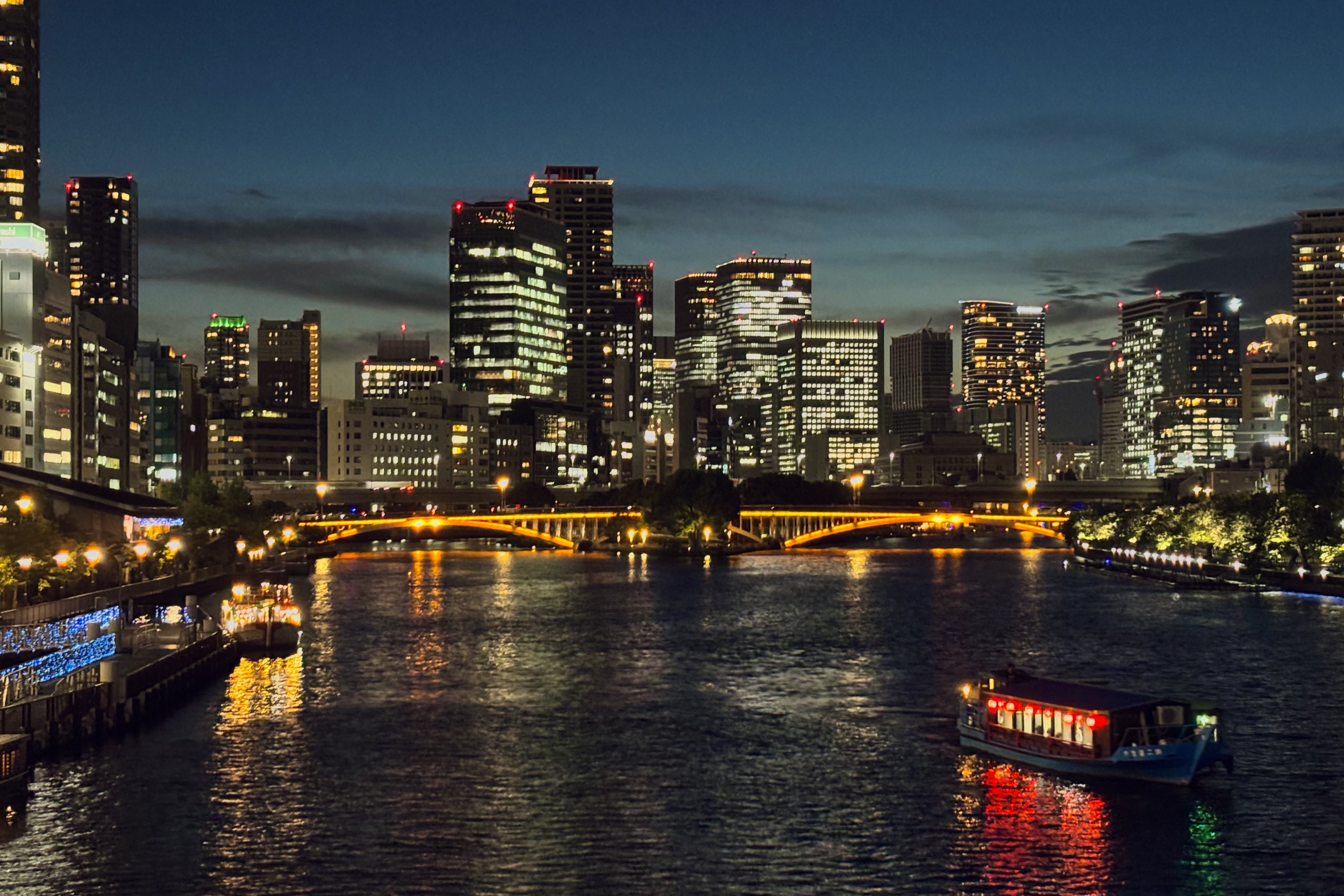
Osaka

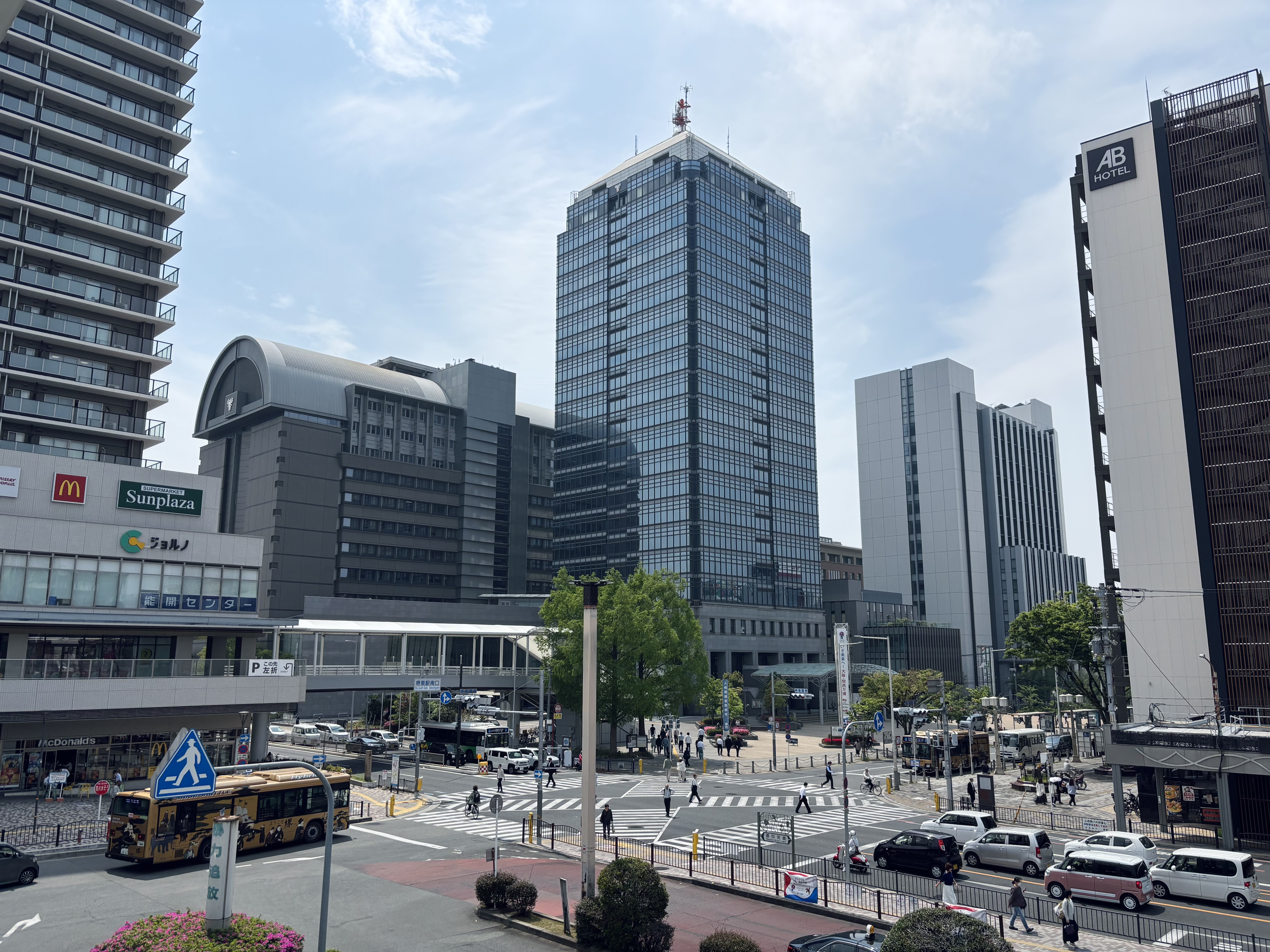
Sakai

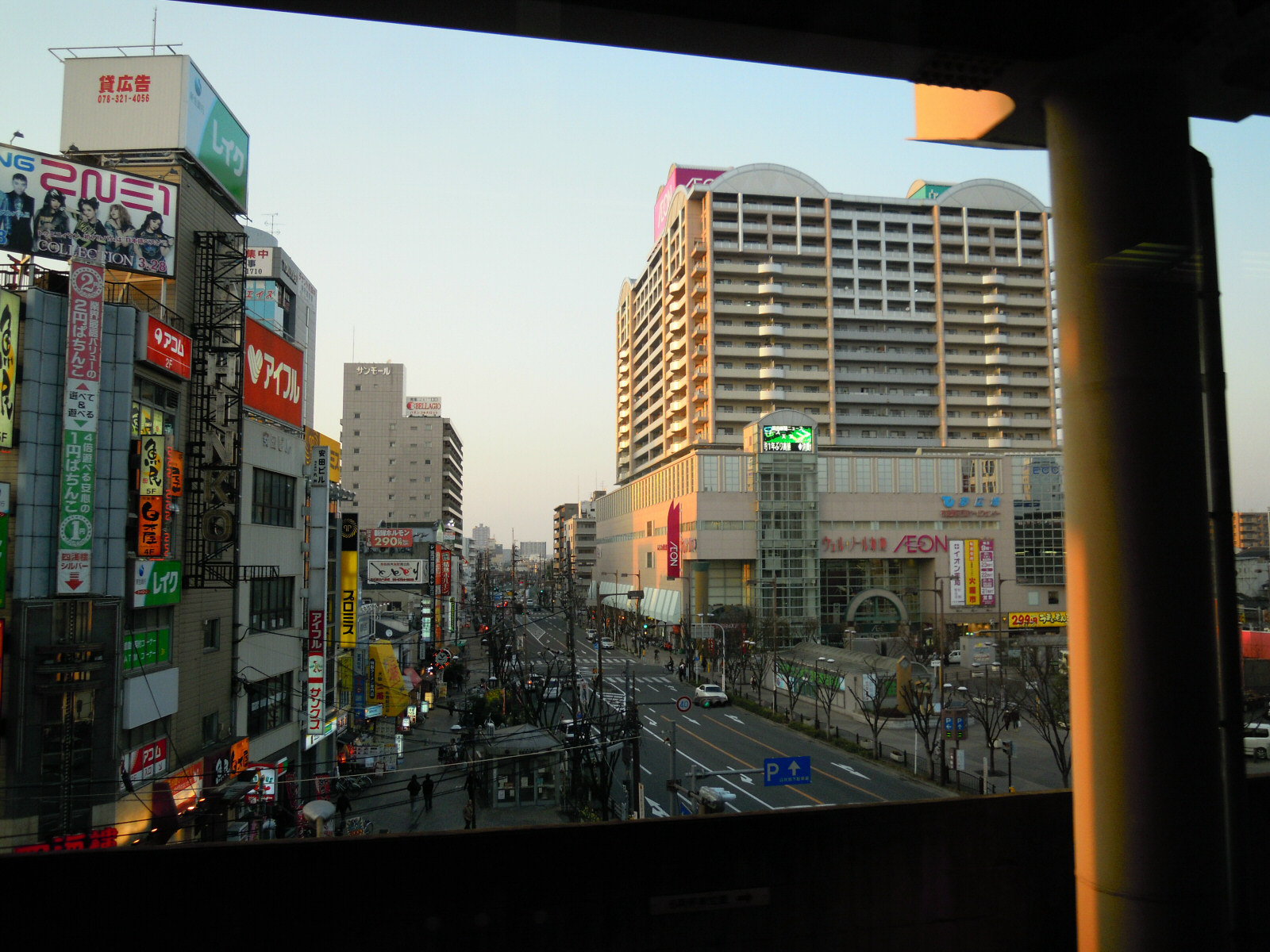
Higashiōsaka

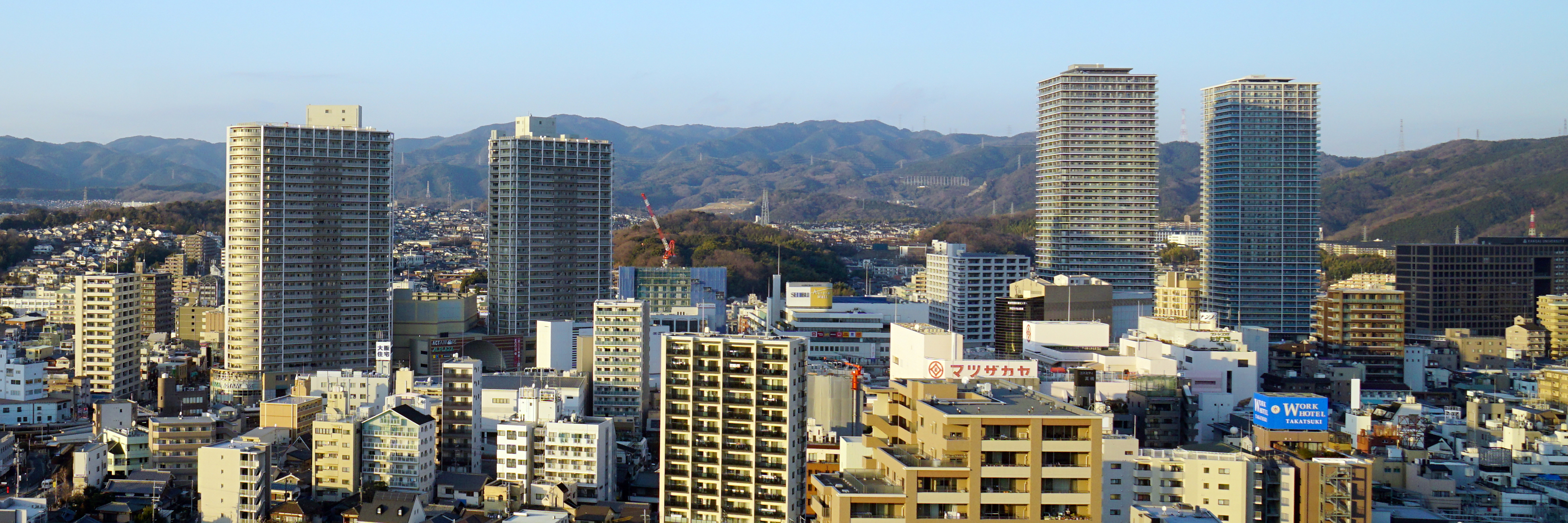
Takatsuki

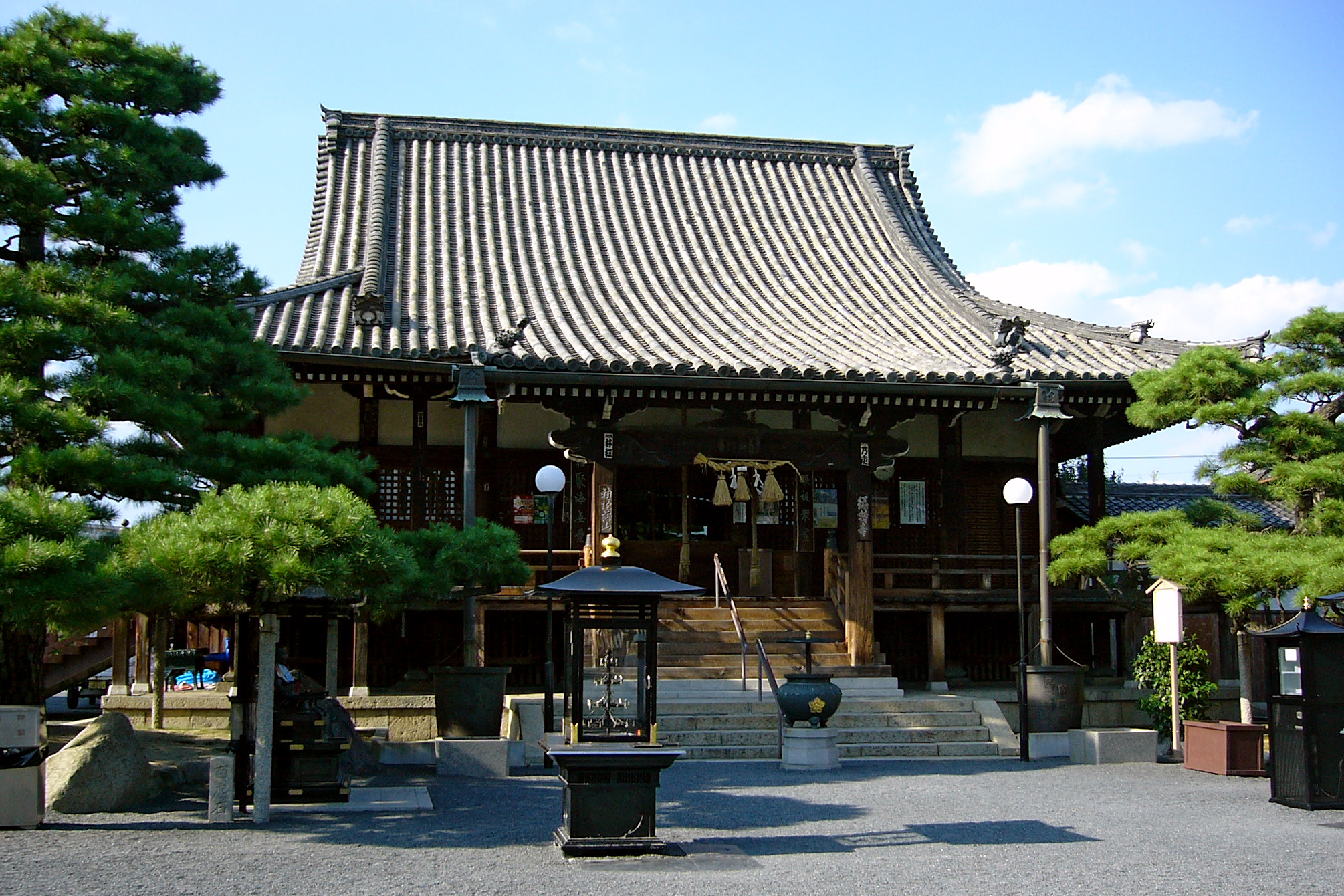
Ibaraki

The following table lists the 40 cities and towns in Osaka with a population of at least 10,000 on October 1, 2020, according to the 2020 Census. The table also gives an overview of the evolution of the population since the 1995 census.

Rank (2020)	Name	Status	2020	2015	2010	2005	2000	1995
1	Osaka	City	2,754,742	2,691,185	2,665,314	2,628,811	2,598,774	2,602,421
2	Sakai	City	826,447	839,310	841,966	830,966	829,636	840,384
3	Higashiōsaka	City	494,074	502,784	509,533	513,821	515,094	517,232
4	Toyonaka	City	401,818	395,479	389,341	386,623	391,726	398,908
5	Hirakata	City	397,596	404,152	407,978	404,044	402,563	400,144
6	Suita	City	385,787	374,468	355,798	353,885	347,929	342,760
7	Takatsuki	City	352,876	351,829	357,359	351,826	357,438	362,270
8	Ibaraki	City	288,014	280,033	274,822	267,961	260,648	258,233
9	Yao	City	264,654	268,800	271,460	273,487	274,777	276,664
10	Neyagawa	City	229,749	237,518	238,204	241,816	250,806	258,443
11	Kishiwada	City	190,796	194,911	199,234	201,047	200,104	194,818
12	Izumi	City	184,634	186,109	184,988	177,856	172,974	157,300
13	Moriguchi	City	143,063	143,042	146,697	147,465	152,298	157,306
14	Minō	City	136,954	133,411	129,895	127,135	124,898	127,542
15	Kadoma	City	119,807	123,576	130,282	131,706	135,648	140,506
16	Daitō	City	119,184	123,217	127,534	126,504	128,917	128,838
17	Matsubara	City	117,611	120,750	124,594	127,276	132,562	134,457
18	Habikino	City	108,872	112,683	117,681	118,695	119,246	117,735
19	Tondabayashi	City	108,768	113,984	119,576	123,934	126,558	121,690
20	Ikeda	City	105,017	103,069	104,229	101,616	101,516	104,293
21	Kawachinagano	City	101,764	106,987	112,490	117,239	121,008	117,082
22	Izumisano	City	100,182	100,966	100,801	98,889	96,064	92,583
23	Settsu	City	87,497	85,007	83,720	85,009	85,065	87,330
24	Kaizuka	City	84,463	88,694	90,492	90,267	88,523	84,653
25	Katano	City	75,077	76,435	77,686	77,644	76,919	72,404
26	Izumiōtsu	City	74,431	75,897	77,548	77,673	75,091	68,842
27	Kashiwara	City	68,789	71,112	74,773	77,034	79,227	80,303
28	Fujiidera	City	63,714	65,438	66,165	65,780	66,806	66,988
29	Sennan	City	60,139	62,438	64,403	64,683	64,152	61,688
30	Ōsakasayama	City	58,486	57,792	58,227	58,111	56,996	57,647
31	Takaishi	City	55,599	56,529	59,572	61,127	62,260	64,295
32	Shijōnawate	City	55,198	56,075	57,554	57,342	55,136	53,763
33	Hannan	City	51,262	54,276	56,646	57,616	58,193	55,625
34	Kumatori	Town	43,796	44,435	45,096	44,505	42,914	40,850
35	Shimamoto	Town	30,899	29,983	28,935	29,052	30,125	30,339
36	Toyono	Town	18,284	19,934	21,989	23,928	25,722	26,617
37	Tadaoka	Town	16,571	17,298	18,149	17,586	17,509	17,098
38	Kanan	Town	15,718	16,126	17,040	17,545	17,341	15,913
39	Misaki	Town	14,787	15,938	17,504	18,504	19,789	20,812
40	Taishi	Town	13,001	13,748	14,220	14,483	14,190	12,872
