= Eslamabad, Urmia =

Village in West Azerbaijan province, Iran

Eslamabad Persian: اسلام اباد
- Village
- Location within Iran
- Coordinates: 37°13′03″N 45°18′28″E
- Country: Iran
- Province: West Azerbaijan
- County: Urmia
- District: Central
- Rural District: Dul

Population (2016)
  - Total: 466
- Time zone: UTC+3:30 (IRST)

Eslamabad (Persian: اسلام اباد) (Note: Also romanized as Eslāmābād; also known as Sheitan Abad Dowl, Sheydān, and Sheyţānābād) is a village in Dul Rural District of the Central District in Urmia County, West Azerbaijan province, Iran.

== Demographics ==
=== Population ===
At the time of the 2006 National Census, the village's population was 514 in 137 households. The following census in 2011 counted 546 people in 177 households. The 2016 census measured the population of the village as 466 people in 156 households.
