= Dizaj-e Dul =

Village in West Azerbaijan province, Iran

Dizaj-e Dul Persian: ديزج دول
- Village
- Location within Iran
- Coordinates: 37°13′50″N 45°20′03″E
- Country: Iran
- Province: West Azerbaijan
- County: Urmia
- District: Central
- Rural District: Dul

Population (2016)
  - Total: 768
- Time zone: UTC+3:30 (IRST)

Dizaj-e Dul (Persian: ديزج دول) (Note: Also romanized as Dīzaj Dūl, Dīzaj-e Daowl, Dizaj-e Dowl, Dīzaj-e Dowl, and Dīzaj-e Dūl; also known as Dīzaj and Dizeh) is a village in, and the capital of, Dul Rural District in the Central District of Urmia County, West Azerbaijan province, Iran.

== Demographics ==
=== Population ===
At the time of the 2006 National Census, the village's population was 714 in 188 households. The following census in 2011 counted 713 people in 232 households. The 2016 census measured the population of the village as 768 people in 233 households. It was the most populous village in its rural district.
