= Kanayama Kofun =

Kofun period burial mound in Japan

- 金山古墳 (Japanese)
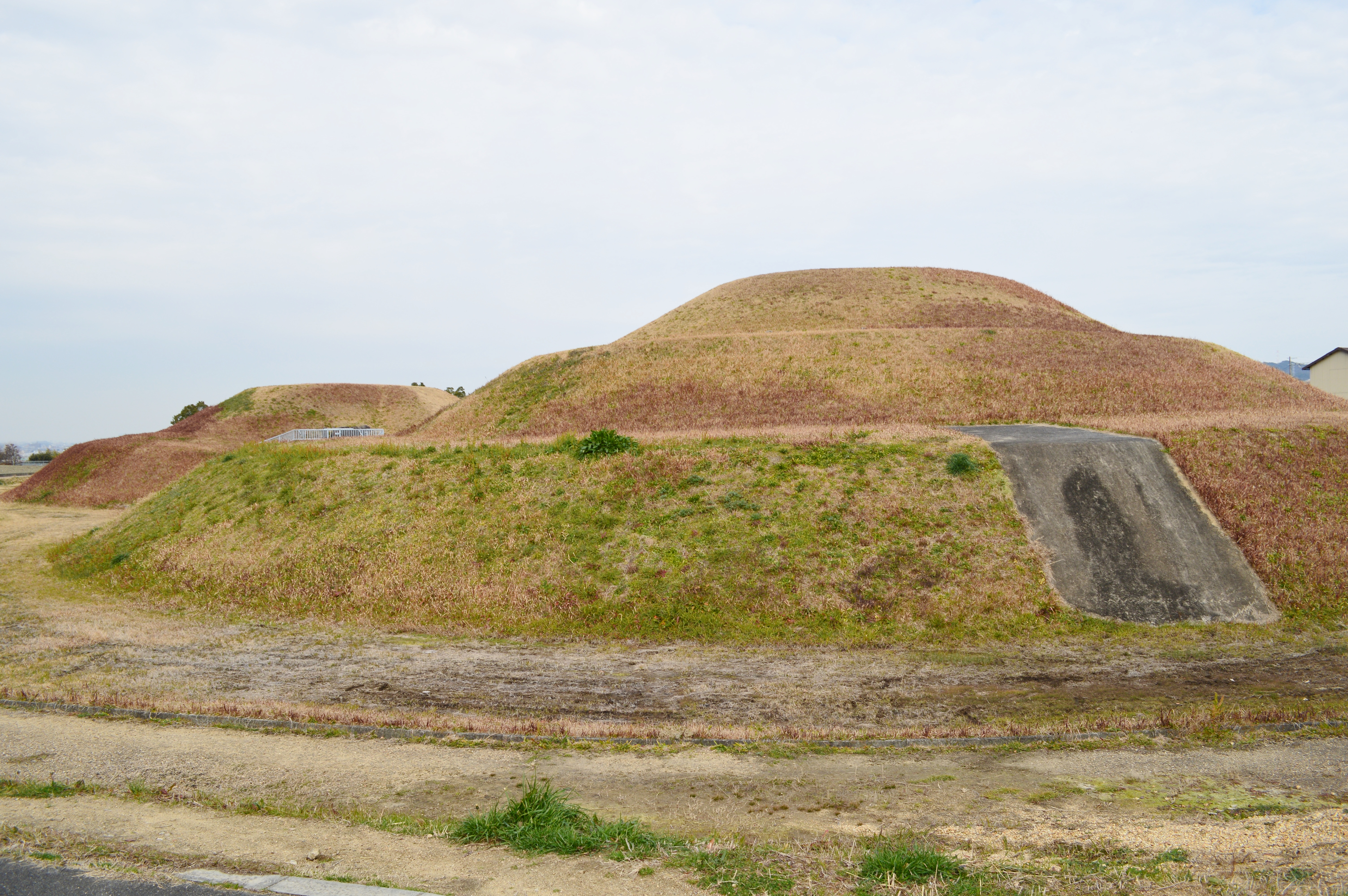
- Kanayama Kofun

- Kanayama Kofun Kanayama Kofun (Japan)
- Interactive map of Kanayama Kofun
- 34°28′9.95″N 135°37′49.00″E
- Type: Kofun
- Periods: Kofun period
- Location: Kanan, Osaka, Japan
- Region: Kansai region

History
- Built: c.7th century AD

Site notes
- Public access: Yes (No facilities)

The Kanayama Kofun (金山古墳) is a Kofun period burial mound located in the Seryutani neighborhood of the town of Kanan, Minamikawachi District, Osaka in the Kansai region of Japan. The tumulus was designated a National Historic Site of Japan in 1991.

== Overview ==
The Kanayama Kofun is an extremely rare sōen-fun (双円墳), which is shaped like a dumbbell, consisting of two joined circular tumuli. It is located in the innermost part of the Kanan Plateau at the western foot of Mount Katsuragi, in the southeastern part of Osaka Prefecture. The two circular tumuli are connected in parallel in the northwest–southeast axis. The north tumulus is a two-tiered construction with a diameter of 38.6 meters, the south tumulus is a three-tiered construction with a diameter of 55.4 meters, and the total length of the mound is 85.8 meters. No haniwa have been found, and fukiishi have been found on both the north and south tumuli, but only on the west side of the constriction, and stone rows are found on the third step of the southern tumulus. The kofun is surrounded by a double-circular moat with an average depth of 1.4 meters, giving a total length, including the moat, of 104 meters. Paddy fields that are one step lower than the surrounding land surround the outer circumference of the mound.

The burial chamber in the northern tumulus is a large stone chamber with a total length of 10.6 meters, containing two house-shaped sarcophagi made of tuff, one in the main chamber and one in the entrance vestibule. It appears to have been robbed in the early 7th century, but archaeological excavations have detected residual grave goods including a few glass balls, silver rings, horse harnesses, iron swords and earthenware. Details of the burial chamber in the southern terminus are less clear as it has not been fully excavated, but it also appears to be a horizontal stone chamber. From the style of construction, is thought that the tumulus was built in the latter half of the 6th century. According to legend, one of these tumuli was the grave of Prince Saegusa, one of the sons of Prince Shotoku.

Archaeological excavations were carried out in 1946 and from 1993 to 1994. From1995, the site has been maintained as Kanayama Kofun Park. It is a three-minute walk from the "Seryutani" bus stop on the Kongo Bus from Tondabayashi Station on the Kintetsu Nagano Line.

Total length
85.8 meters:
North Tumulus
38.6 meter diameter x 6.8 meters high, 2-tier
South Tumulus
55.4 meter diameter x 9.4 meters high, 3-tier

== Gallery ==
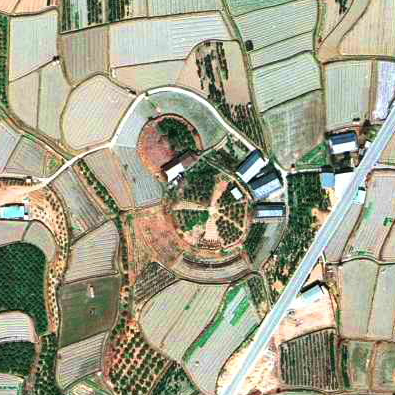
Aerial photograph

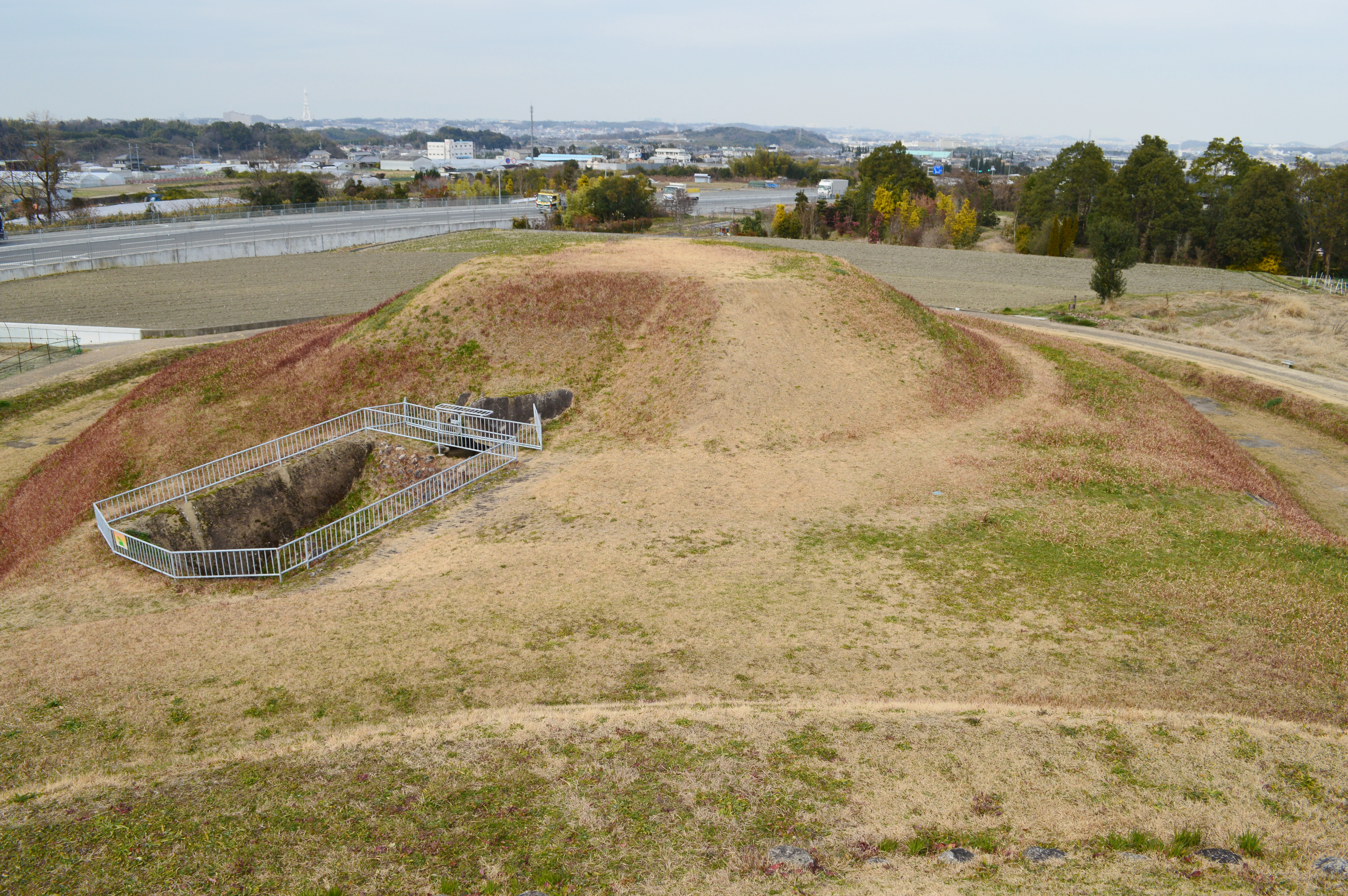
North Tumulus

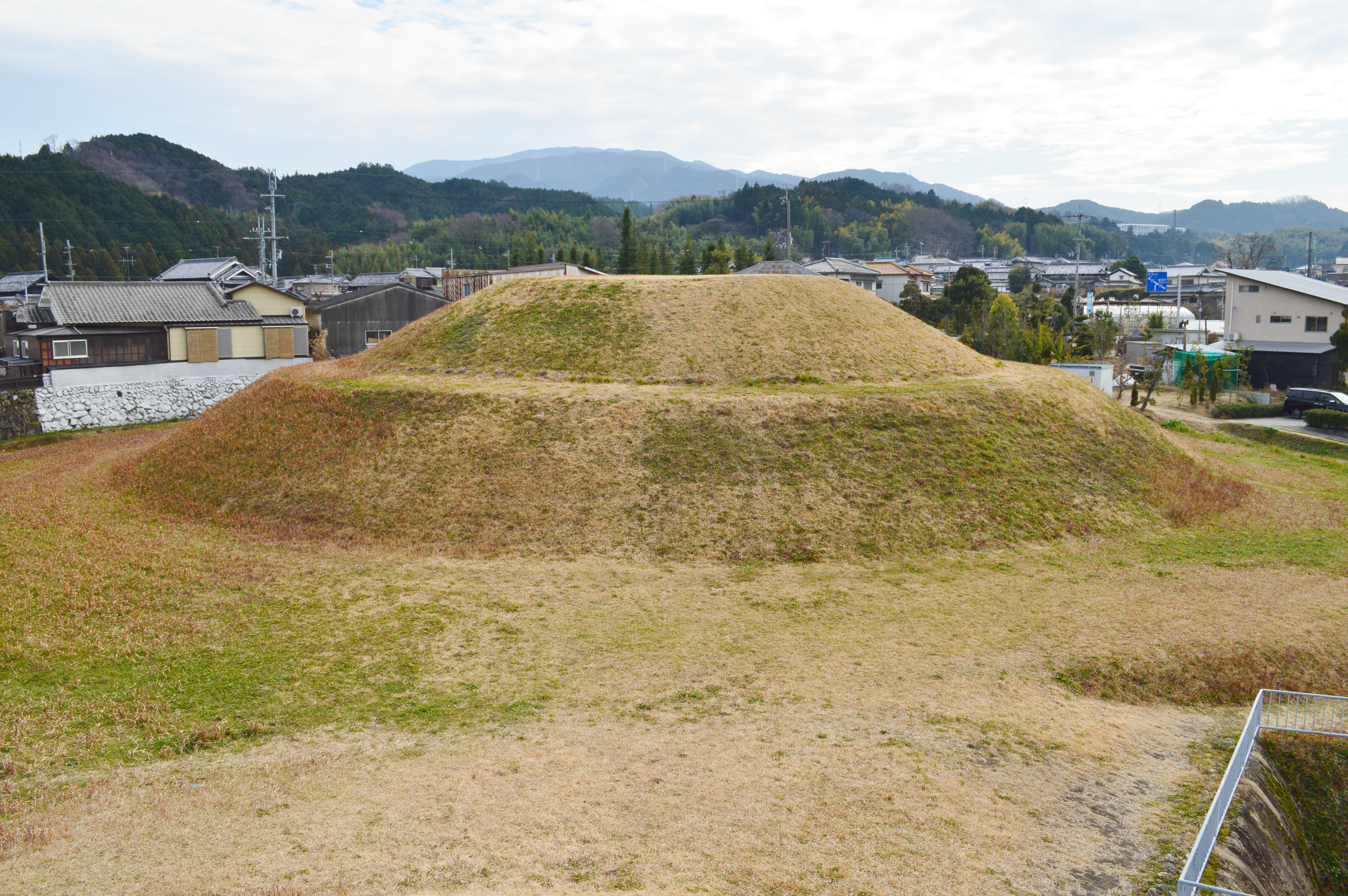
South Tumulus

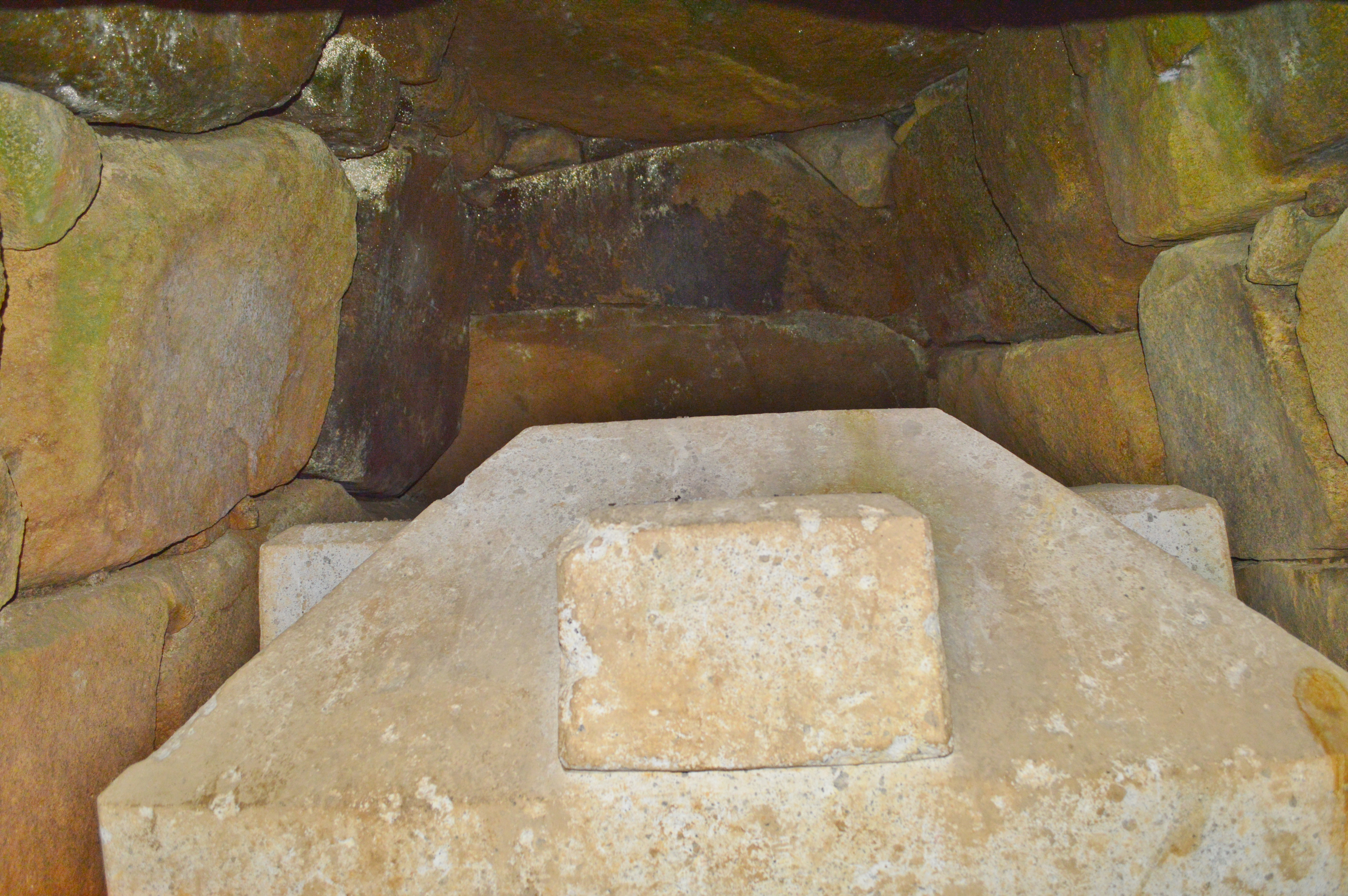
North Tumulus burial chamber sarcophagus

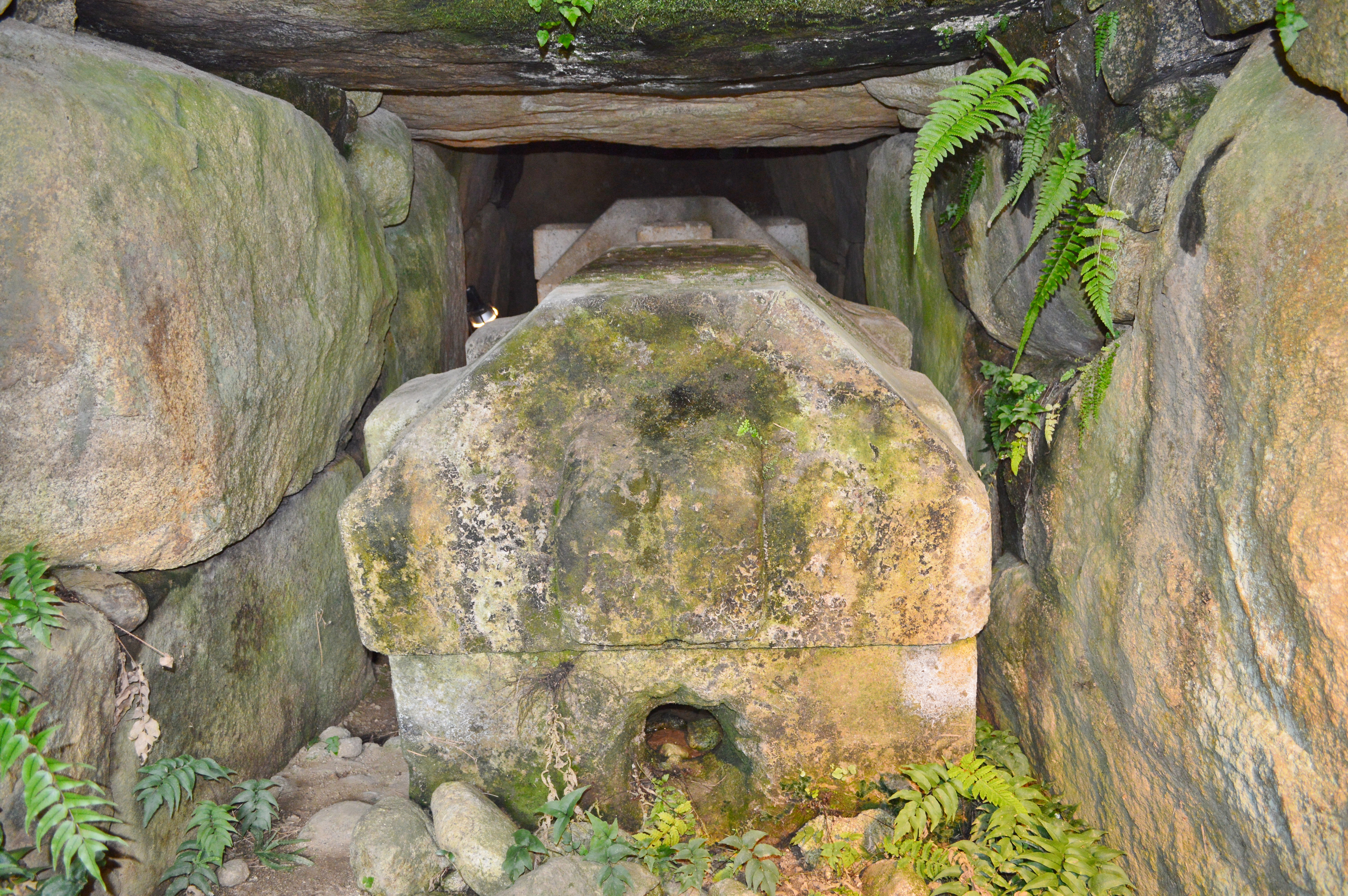
North Tumulus vestibule sarcophagus

== See also ==
- List of Historic Sites of Japan (Osaka)
