= Dalow =

Village in West Azerbaijan province, Iran

Dalow Persian: دلو
- Village
- Location within Iran
- Coordinates: 37°10′06″N 45°17′01″E
- Country: Iran
- Province: West Azerbaijan
- County: Urmia
- District: Central
- Rural District: Dul

Population (2016)
  - Total: 486
- Time zone: UTC+3:30 (IRST)

Dalow (Persian: دلو) (Note: Also known as Dalī) is a village in Dul Rural District of the Central District in Urmia County, West Azerbaijan province, Iran.

== Demographics ==
=== Population ===
At the time of the 2006 National Census, the village's population was 508 in 82 households. The following census in 2011 counted 474 people in 112 households. The 2016 census measured the population of the village as 486 people in 111 households.
