= Ziveh, Urmia =

Village in West Azerbaijan province, Iran

Ziveh Persian: زيوه
- Village
- Location within Iran
- Coordinates: 37°12′32″N 45°15′33″E
- Country: Iran
- Province: West Azerbaijan
- County: Urmia
- District: Central
- Rural District: Dul

Population (2016)
  - Total: 401
- Time zone: UTC+3:30 (IRST)

Ziveh (Persian: زيوه) (Note: Also romanized as Zīveh) is a village in Dul Rural District of the Central District in Urmia County, West Azerbaijan province, Iran.

== Demographics ==
=== Population ===
At the time of the 2006 National Census, the village's population was 362 in 61 households. The following census in 2011 counted 200 people in 42 households. The 2016 census measured the population of the village as 401 people in 84 households.
