= Nanas, Iran =

Village in West Azerbaijan province, Iran

Nanas Persian: ناناس
- Village
- Location within Iran
- Coordinates: 37°11′55″N 45°15′12″E
- Country: Iran
- Province: West Azerbaijan
- County: Urmia
- District: Central
- Rural District: Dul

Population (2016)
  - Total: 595
- Time zone: UTC+3:30 (IRST)

Nanas (Persian: ناناس) (Note: Also romanized as Nānās) is a village in Dul Rural District of the Central District in Urmia County, West Azerbaijan province, Iran.

== Demographics ==
=== Population ===
At the time of the 2006 National Census, the village's population was 500 in 105 households. The following census in 2011 counted 548 people in 120 households. The 2016 census measured the population of the village as 595 people in 153 households.
