= Jian'an =

Jian'an, Chien-an, or Chienan may refer to:

- Jian'an (Eastern Han) (196–220), an era name used by Emperor Xian of Han
- Jian'an poetry, a Chinese poetry style associated with the late Han dynasty
- Seven Scholars of Jian'an, a group of scholars from the above period
- Jian'an District, a district of Xuchang, Henan
- Jian'an Subdistrict, Shijiazhuang, a subdistrict in Qiaodong District, Shijiazhuang, Hebei

== See also ==
- Jianan (disambiguation), or Chianan
