= Chianan =

Chianan, Chia-nan, or Jianan may refer to:

- Chiayi–Tainan Plain, also known as the Chianan or Jianan Plain (嘉南平原, Jiānán Píngyuán), a large plain on Taiwan Island
- Chianan Irrigation (嘉南大圳, Jianán Dàzùn), also known as the Kanan Irrigation, used by farms in the Taiwanese plain

== See also ==
- Wang Jianan (disambiguation)
- Jian'an (disambiguation) or Chien-an, sometimes misspelled as Jianan or Chianan
- Kanan (disambiguation), the Japanese pronunciation of the same characters
