= Ichisuka Kofun Cluster =

Group of burial mounds in Kanan, Japan

- 一須賀古墳群 (Japanese)
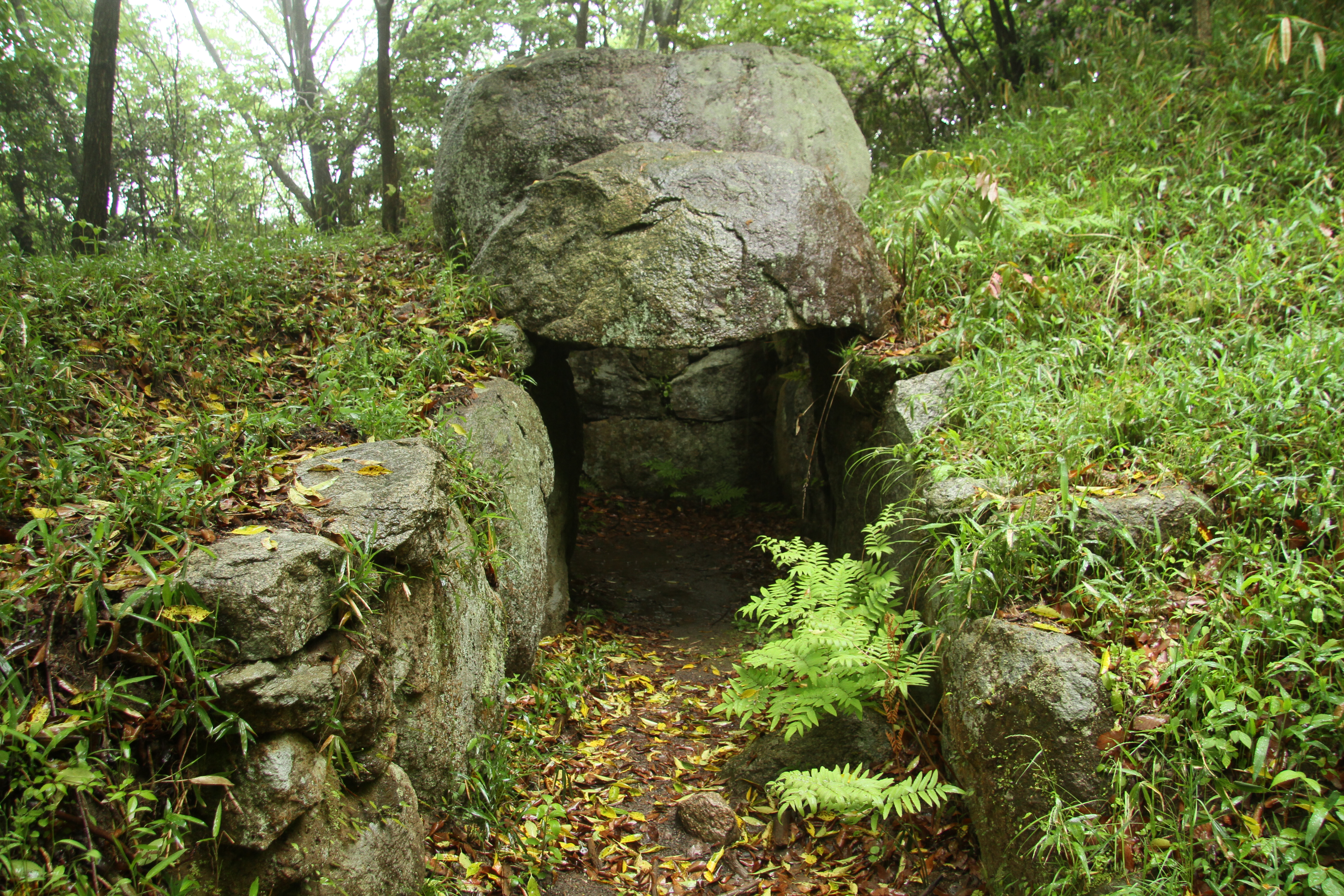
- Ichisuka Kofun Cluster, Tumulus E-1

- Ichisuka Kofun Cluster Ichisuka Kofun Cluster (Japan)
- Interactive map of Ichisuka Kofun Cluster
- 34°30′8.5″N 135°38′46.0″E
- Type: Kofun
- Periods: Kofun period
- Location: Taishi and Kanan, Osaka Japan
- Region: Kansai region

History
- Built: c.6th to 7th century AD

Site notes
- Public access: Yes (Park, Museum)

The Ichisuka Kofun Cluster (一須賀古墳群, Ichisuka Kofun gun) is a group of Kofun period burial mounds, scattered on the hills from Hamuro, in the town of Taishi to Ichisuka and Higashiyama, in the town of Kanan, Osaka Prefecture. in the Kansai region of Japan. The tumulus group was designated a National Historic Site of Japan in 1994.

== Overview ==
The Ichisuka Kofun Cluster consists of 262 circular enpun (円墳)-style tumuli, in 23 groups of several to dozens per group. Most of the tumuli are small with a diameters of 15 to 20 meters, and contain a horizontal hole type stone burial chamber, except for a few that have a wooden coffin direct burial. Two or four stone sarcophagi or wooden coffins are placed in the burial chamber, and miniature rice cookers such as a kamado is placed as one of the grave goods. Other grave goods included fragments of gold and bronze shoes, jewelry fragments, and the head of an iron sword, horse fittings and beads, along with quantities of Korean-style pottery shards. Judging from the excavated Sue pottery, it is thought that the construction of these tumuli started in the first half of the 6th century and ended from the beginning to the first half of the 7th century.

From the miniature rice cooker as a ritual implement, it is estimated that toraijin, immigrants from the Korean kingdoms of Goguryeo and Baekje were involved in the construction of this tumulus group. The area where the Ichisuka Kofun Cluster is located, is also called "Chikatsu Asuka", and was a location where many Baekje migrants settled around the 6th century. The Soga clan, who emerged as a new force in the Yamato Kingship at the same time, had a close relationship with this region and also with Baekje kingdom.

Excavations were conducted in 1966; however, approximately 30 kofun on the western side of the site were destroyed from 1965 to 1974 due to the residential land development work. Recognizing the importance of the tumulus group, the Osaka Prefectural government acquired 29 hectares of the most densely populated area of the site for preservation. Currently, the area is opened to the public as the Chikatsu Asuka Fudoki-ga-oka Park (大阪府立近つ飛鳥風土記の丘), with 32 of the 102 tumuli that have been preserved on a walking path. Then park is located a five-minute walk from the "Hannan Neopolis" on the Kongo Bus from Kishi Station on the Kintetsu Nagano Line.

== Gallery ==
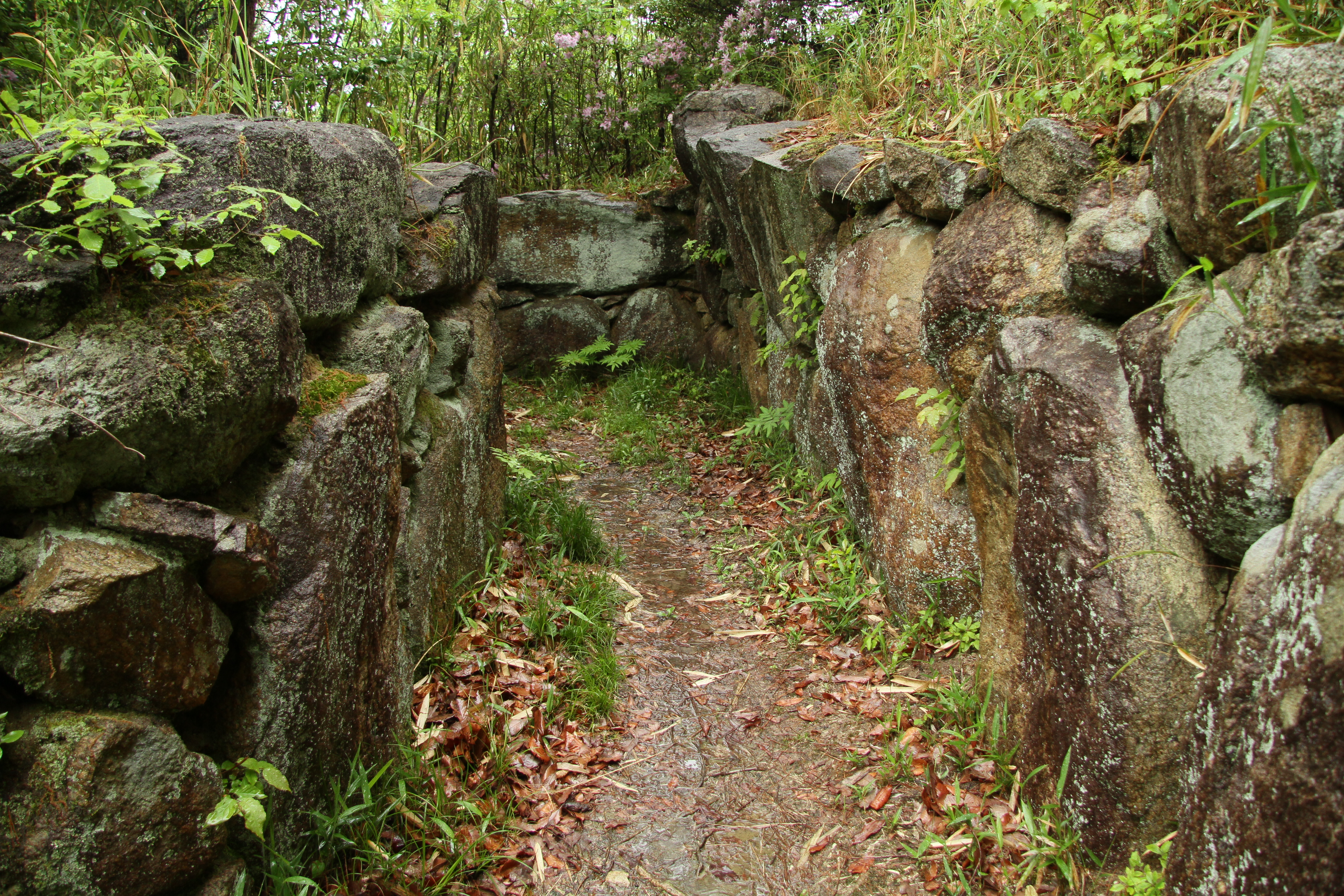
B-4 Tumulus

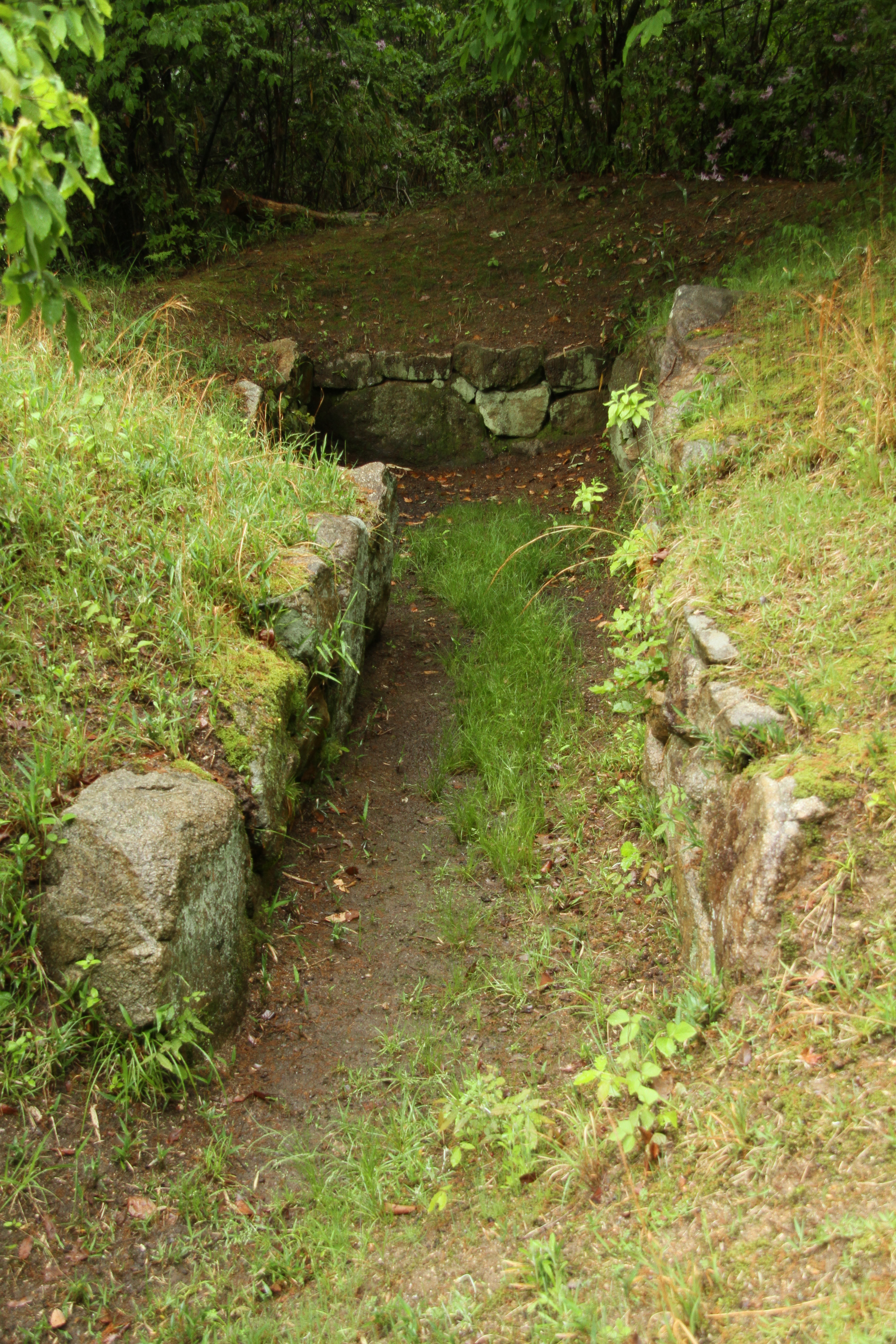
B-7 Tumulus

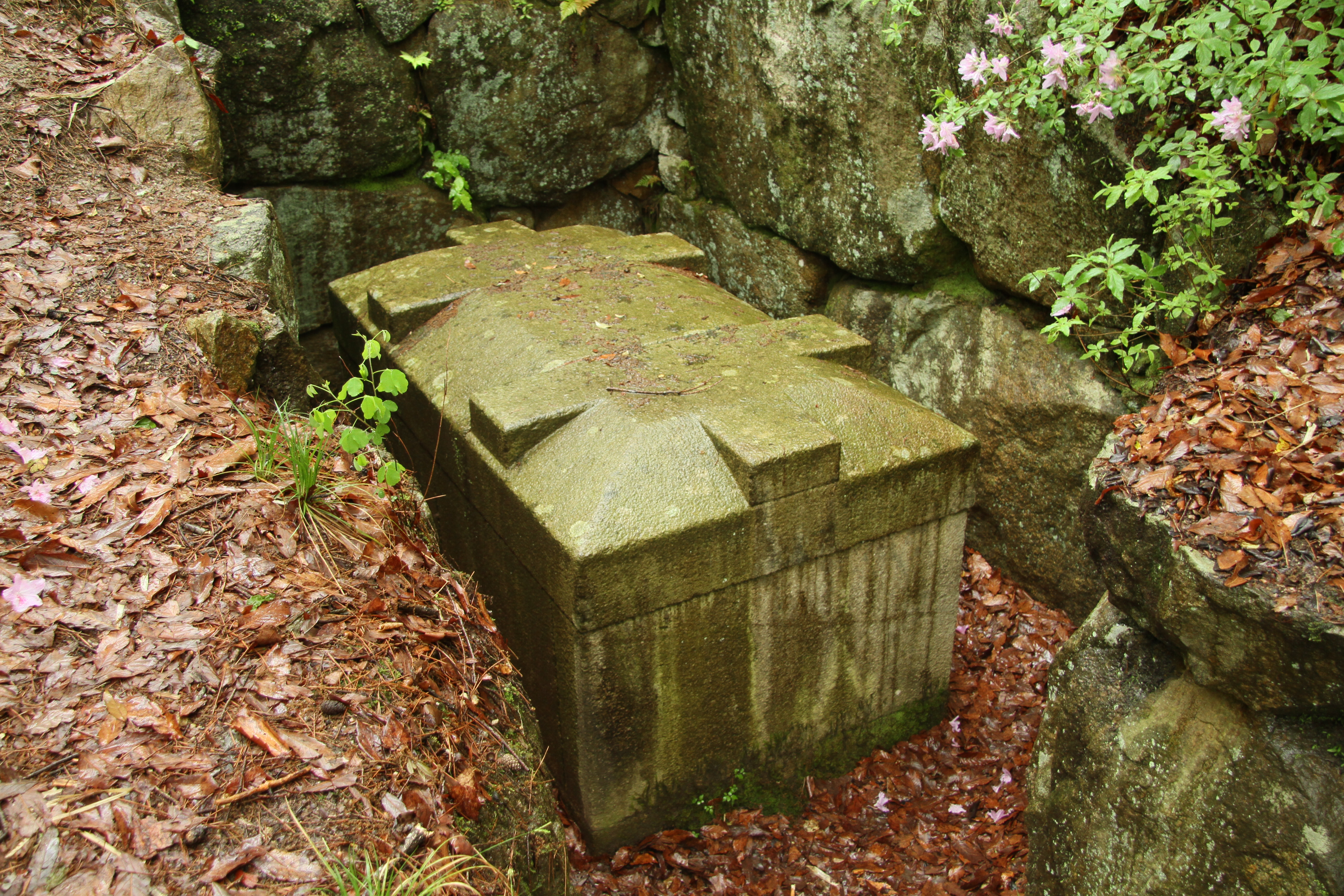
B-9 Tumulus

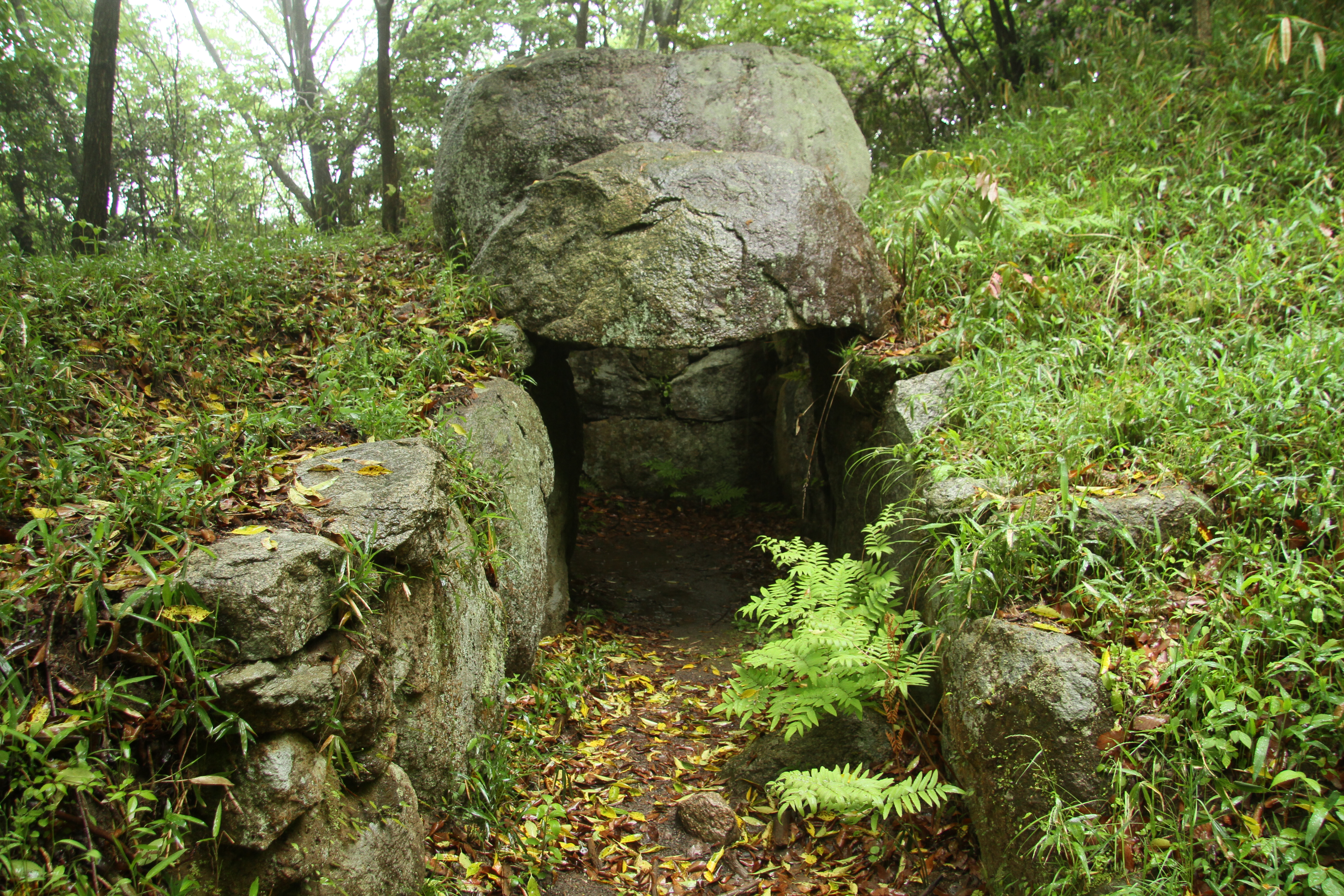
E-1 Tumulus

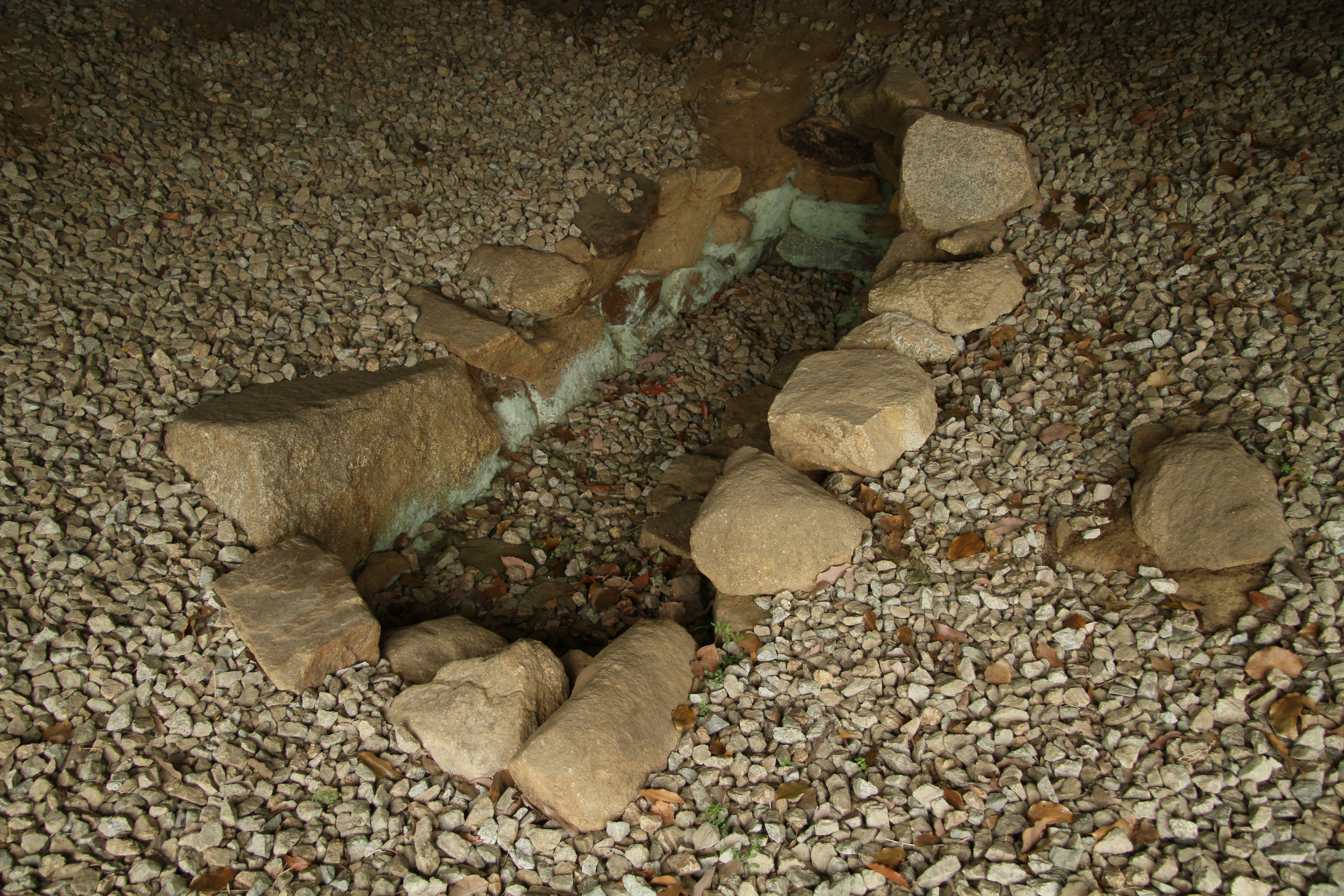
I-7 Tumulus

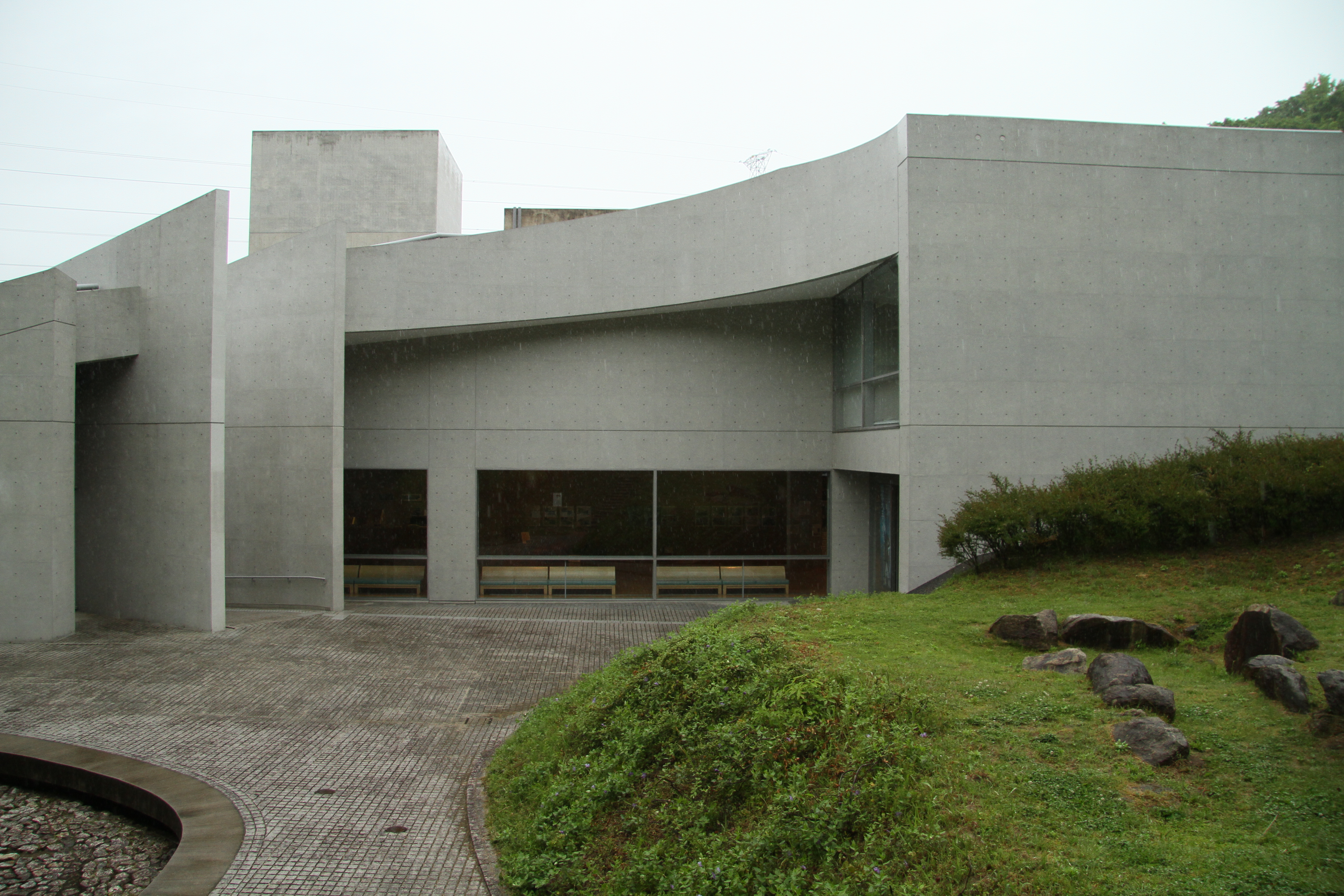
Osaka Prefectural Chikatsu Asuka Museum

== See also ==
- List of Historic Sites of Japan (Osaka)
