= Nari, Urmia =

Village in West Azerbaijan province, Iran

Nari Persian: ناری
- Village
- Location within Iran
- Coordinates: 37°14′56″N 45°15′37″E
- Country: Iran
- Province: West Azerbaijan
- County: Urmia
- District: Central
- Rural District: Dul

Population (2016)
  - Total: 551
- Time zone: UTC+3:30 (IRST)

Nari (Persian: ناری) (Note: Also romanized as Nārī; also known as Nerī) is a village in Dul Rural District of the Central District in Urmia County, West Azerbaijan province, Iran.

== Demographics ==
=== Population ===
At the time of the 2006 National Census, the village's population was 698 in 141 households. The following census in 2011 counted 694 people in 155 households. The 2016 census measured the population of the village as 551 people in 133 households.
