= Kanan Yusif-zada =

Surgeon and military administrator (b. 1973)

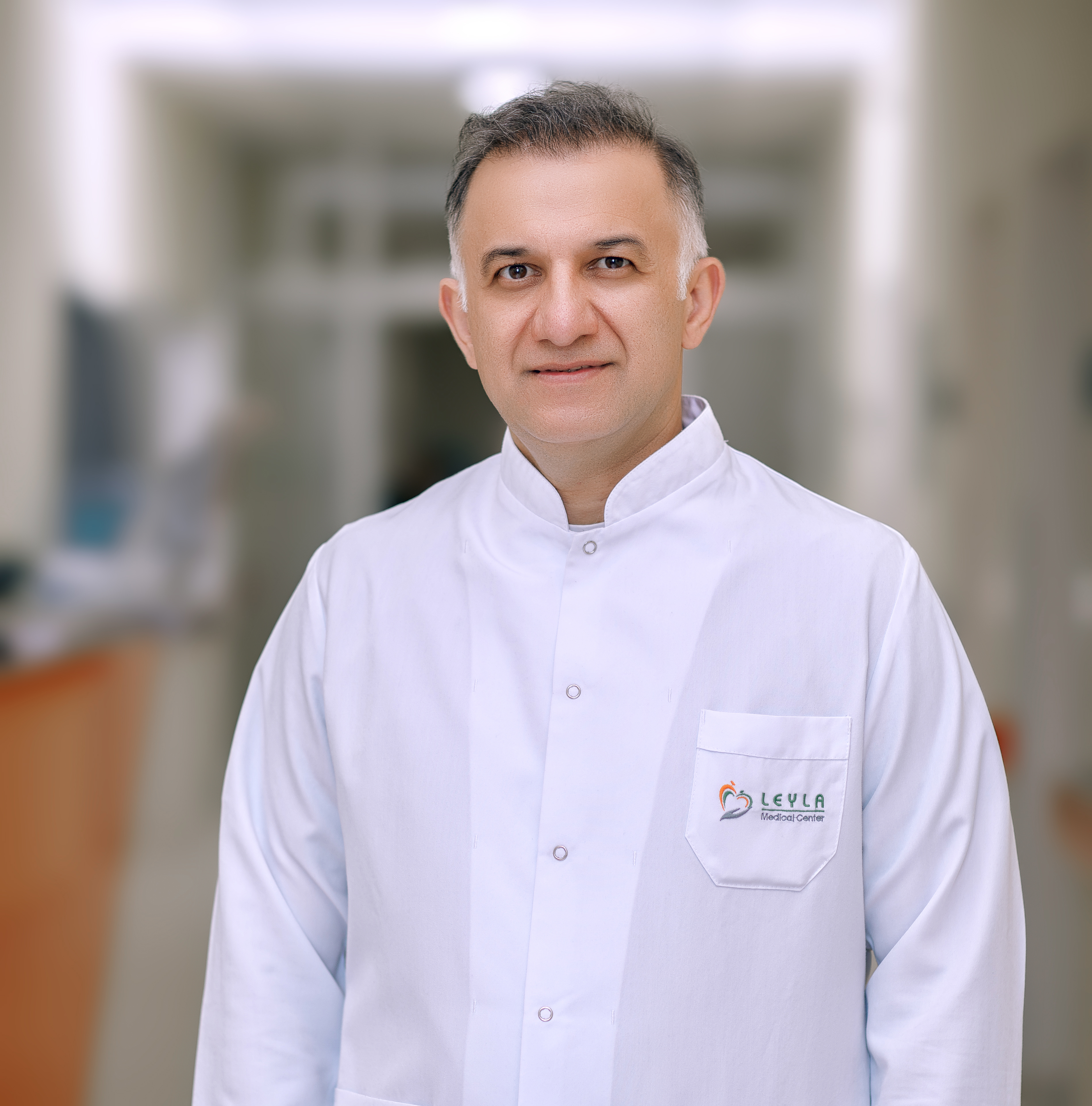
Prof.Dr. Kanan Yusif-zada

Kanan Yusif-zada (Kanan Raphael oghlu Yusif-zada) is an Azerbaijani surgeon, a professor of Azerbaijan National Academy of Sciences, an honorary doctor, past-Head of the Military Medical Division of the State Border Service (Azerbaijan), retired colonel of medical services, and a member of international medical organizations.

== Early life ==
Kanan Yusif-zada was born in Gakh, Azerbaijan on June 28, 1973.

He started his primary education in Khutul, Mongolia. Later he came to Azerbaijan and completed his secondary education at the gymnasium of physics and mathematics in Sumgayit with a "Silver" medal.

In 1990, he started his undergraduate education at Azerbaijan Medical University and graduated from this faculty in 1996 with honors.

During 1996-1998, he studied general surgery at Azerbaijan Medical University.

During 1998–2004, he completed his residency in General Surgery of Gazi University in Ankara, Turkey.

In 2004, he protected scientific work under the name “Role of Anandamide at mesenteric ischemia-reperfusion” and was awarded the title of Ph.D. in Medicine.

In 2004, he carried out research work in the framework of the Scientific and Technological Research Council of Turkey (TUBITAK) sponsored NATO-PC "B" scholarship program in Ankara, Turkey and earned the highest qualification (Gastroenterology and Invasive Endoscopy) certificate.

In 2004 he completed research work within the NATO-PC "B" scholarship program supported by TUBITAK in Ankara, Turkey, and received a certificate of higher specialization (Gastroenterology and Invasive Endoscopy).

In 2008, he started a research fellowship in the Department of Colorectal Surgery in Cleveland Clinic in the United States, and that December, worked as a visiting physician at the Department of General Surgery and Kidney and Pancreas Transplantation at Mayo Clinic.

He enrolled in the MBA program at the Maastricht School of Management in the Netherlands from 2013 to 2015 and earned an Executive MBA at the ADA University in Azerbaijan from 2013 to 2016.

In 2016, he defended the Ph.D. thesis on "Minimally invasive interventions in pathologies of extrahepatic biliar system structures".

== Career ==
He specializes in general and military surgery, gastroenterology and surgical endoscopy, breast and endocrine surgery, hepatopancreatobiliary surgery, colorectal surgery, military trauma, and business management.

=== Medical work ===
Kanan Yusif-zada gained his first medical experience in 1991–1996 as a senior preparator in the department of "Operative surgery and topographic anatomy" of Azerbaijan Medical University. Later he worked at the division of clinical ordinatura there.

- Chief of Department of Surgery in City Hospital, Baku (2004-2005)
- Chief of Department of Endoscopic Surgery and Diagnostics in Central Hospital of Oil Workers (2005-2010)
- Head of the State Border Service (Azerbaijan) Military Hospital (2010-2020)
- Head of the Military Medical Division of the State Border Service of the Republic of Azerbaijan (2020-2021)
- General Surgeon and Gastroenterologist at "Leyla Medical Center" (from 11.2021 up to now)

In 2016 he began working as a professor teaching Fundamentals of Medical Aid in Civil Defense at the Department of Chemical Engineering in Baku Higher Oil School.

From 10.2022 up to now - Lecturer at the Azerbaijan State University of Economics (UNEC), Healthcare Management.

Presidium of the Azerbaijan National Academy of Sciences elected Yusif-zada Kanan Rafael - Professor of the Azerbaijan National Academy of Sciences in 2019.

=== Societies ===
- Turkish-Azerbaijani Endoscopic Surgeons Association, founder and chairman (2007-2018)
- Russian Society of Surgeons (from 2016 to the present)
- Ambroise Paré International Military Surgery Forum (President, 2017-2019)

==== Books ====
- 2002: General Surgery (in Turkish), co-author.
- 2005: Gynecologic and Obstetrical Surgery (in English), Ventral Abdominal Hernias, and Malign and Benign diseases of breast (two chapters)
- 2011: Gastrointestinal Endoscopy (in Azerbaijani), Baku, Azerbaijan.
- 2012: Surgical Endoscopy (in Azerbaijani), Baku, Azerbaijan.
- 2016: Semi-Public Hospital Management (in English), Baku, Azerbaijan.
- 2017: Fundamentals of Civil Defense and Medical Aid (in English), Baku, Azerbaijan.
- 2018: Military-Medical Explanatory Dictionary, Baku, Azerbaijan.
- 2022: Comprehensive Explanatory Dictionary of Medical Terms (in Azerbaijani), Baku, Azerbaijan.

== Recognition ==
- 2006: Taraggi Medal, by the decree of the President of the Republic of Azerbaijan.
- 2007: Academician Yusif Mammadaliyev Medal, by "Bilik" Center of Education, Culture, and Information of the Republic of Azerbaijan.
- 2011–2016: 5 medals by the head of State Border Service (Azerbaijan).
- 2011: Third Degree Medal for Distinguished Military Service.
- 2013: Jubilee Medal for the 95th Anniversary of the Azerbaijani Armed Forces.
- 2014: Jubilee Medal for the 95th anniversary of the State Border Service (Azerbaijan).
- 2015: Third Degree Medal for Distinguished Military Service.
- 2016: For military services medal, by the decree of the President of the Republic of Azerbaijan.
- 2017: Honorary title "Honorary Doctor", by the decree of the President of the Republic of Azerbaijan.
- 2018: Michael E. Debakey International Military Surgeons' Award.
- 2019: "100th anniversary of the Border Guard of the Republic of Azerbaijan (1919-2019)" anniversary medal.
- 2020: The Order "For Merit to the Fatherland", III class for his work as a doctor-surgeon in the 44-day Patriotic War (by order of the President of the Republic of Azerbaijan).

=== Patents ===
- “Method of treatment of peritonitis” registered by the State Committee of Science and Technology of the Republic of Azerbaijan in the state register in 18.12.98 (P 980095);
- “Laparoscopic Trainer” registered by the State Committee of Standardization, Metrology and Patent of Azerbaijan Republic in 05.11.2014 (F20140011)
