= Kanan-e Olya =

Kanan-e Olya كنعان عليا
- Village
- Location within Iran
- Coordinates: 37°14′45″N 45°20′09″E
- Country: Iran
- Province: West Azerbaijan
- County: Urmia
- Bakhsh: Central
- Rural District: Dul

Population (2006)
  - Total: 156
- Time zone: UTC+3:30 (IRST)
  - Summer (DST): UTC+4:30 (IRDT)

Kanan-e Olya (Persian: كنعان عليا, also Romanized as Kan‘ān-e ‘Olyā; also known as Kan‘ān-e Īl) is a village in Dul Rural District, in the Central District of Urmia County, West Azerbaijan Province, Iran. At the 2006 census, its population was 156, in 40 families.
