= Kanan (tigress) =

Indian tigress

Kanan was a wild tigress who jumped into a zoo enclosure in 1967, lured by a male tiger. Kanan sacrificed her freedom for captive tiger Pradeep and entered his open-air enclosure at the Nandankanan Zoo in Bhubaneswar, Odisha, Eastern India. Unfortunately, Pradeep would not accept Kanan as he already had a companion named Sikha.

Kanan was celibate until her death on 21 July 1978 without accepting any other mate.

Now, the Kanan Sq. at Nandankanan Zoo "immortalizes this iconic appreciate tale".
