= Kanan-e Sofla =

Kanan-e Sofla کنعان سفلی
- Village
- Location within Iran
- Coordinates: 37°14′30″N 45°20′30″E
- Country: Iran
- Province: West Azerbaijan
- County: Urmia
- Bakhsh: Central
- Rural District: Dul

Population (2006)
  - Total: 111
- Time zone: UTC+3:30 (IRST)
  - Summer (DST): UTC+4:30 (IRDT)

Kanan-e Sofla (Persian: کنعان سفلی, also Romanized as Kan‘ān-e Soflá; also known as Kan‘ān-e Ra‘īyat) is a village in Dul Rural District, in the Central District of Urmia County, West Azerbaijan Province, Iran. At the 2006 census, its population was 111, in 26 families.
