= Balestan, East Azerbaijan =

Balestan بالستان
- Village
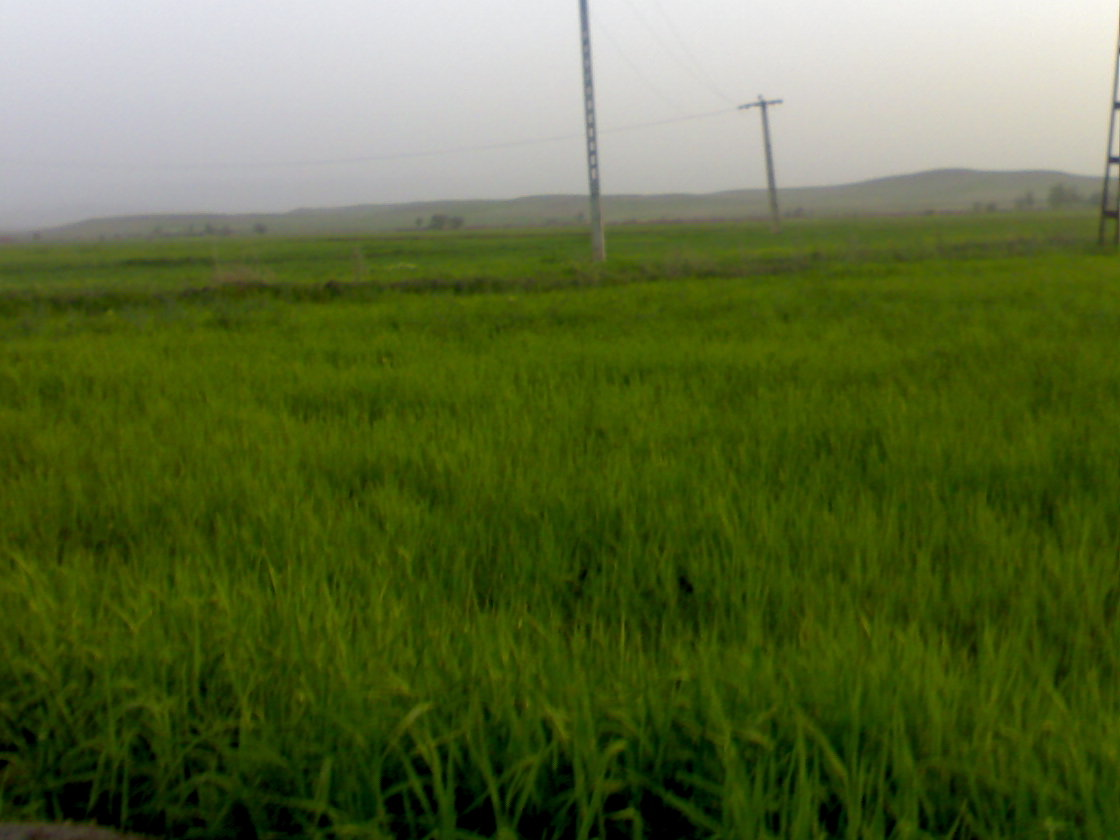
- The village of Balestan

- Location within Iran
- Coordinates: 37°57′55″N 47°16′37″E
- Country: Iran
- Province: East Azerbaijan
- County: Sarab
- Bakhsh: Central
- Rural District: Abarghan

Population (2006)
  - Total: 111
- Time zone: UTC+3:30 (IRST)
  - Summer (DST): UTC+4:30 (IRDT)

Balestan (Persian: بالستان, also romanized as Bālestān) is a village in Abarghan Rural District, in the Central District of Sarab County, East Azerbaijan Province, Iran. At the 2006 census, its population was 111, in 26 families.
