= Balestan, West Azerbaijan =

Village in West Azerbaijan province, Iran

Balestan Persian: بالستان
- Village
- Location within Iran
- Coordinates: 37°09′40″N 45°22′52″E
- Country: Iran
- Province: West Azerbaijan
- County: Urmia
- District: Central
- Rural District: Dul

Population (2016)
  - Total: 730
- Time zone: UTC+3:30 (IRST)

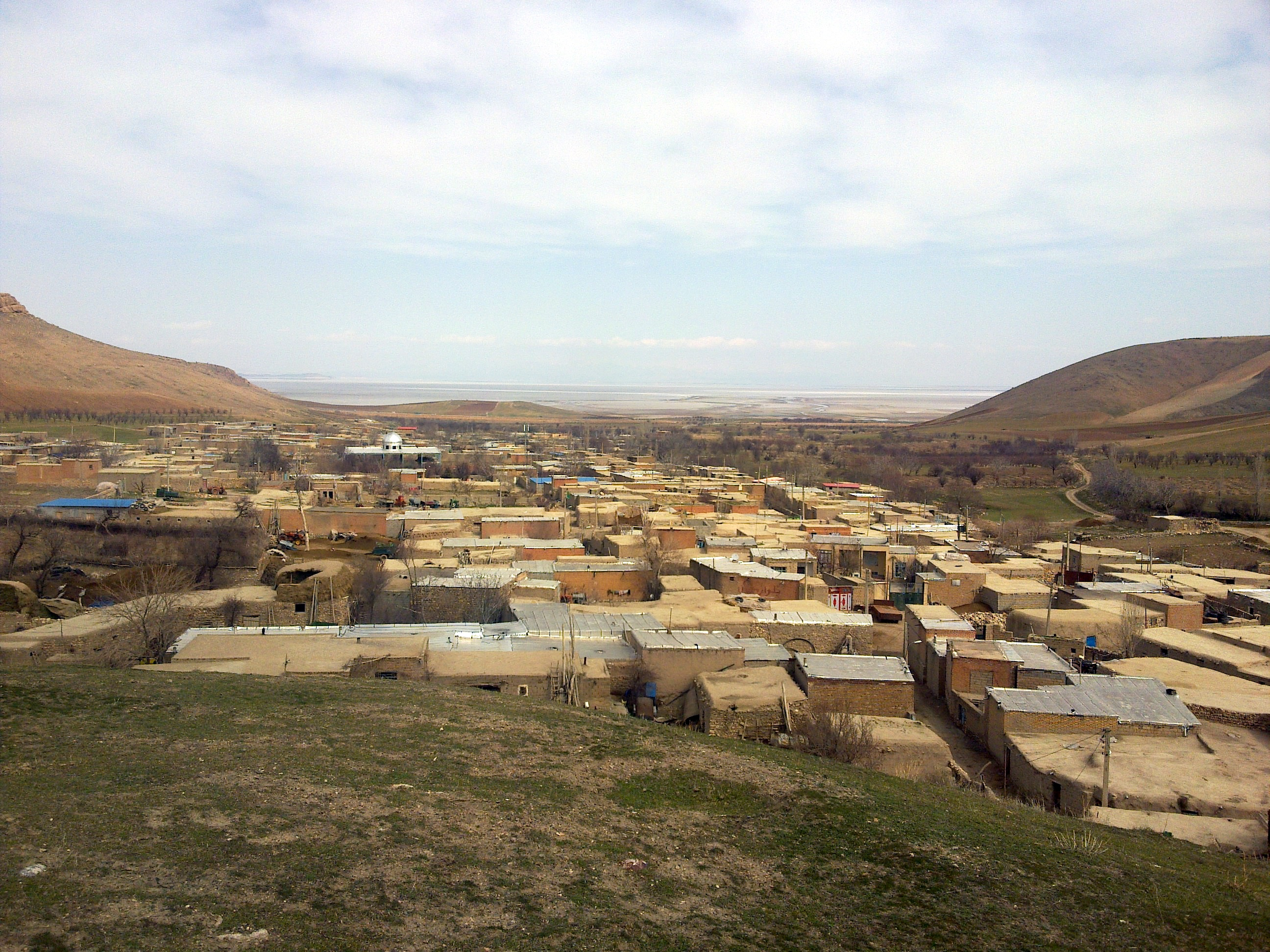
Balistan village in the Dol district of Urmia

Balestan (Persian: بالستان) (Note: Also romanized as Bālestān) is a village in Dul Rural District of the Central District in Urmia County, West Azerbaijan province, Iran.

== Demographics ==
=== Population ===
At the time of the 2006 National Census, the village's population was 973 in 248 households. The following census in 2011 counted 822 people in 263 households. The 2016 census measured the population of the village as 730 people in 247 households.
