= Kanan, Myanmar =

Kanan ကနန်
- Village
- Location in Myanmar (Burma)
- Coordinates: 23°48′14″N 94°08′41″E
- Country: Myanmar
- Region: Sagaing Region
- District: Tamu District
- Township: Tamu Township
- Village tract: Kanan village tract
- Time zone: UTC+6.30 (MMT)

Kanan (Burmese: ကနန်ရွာ) is a village in the Kanan village tract, Tamu Township, Sagaing Region, Myanmar. The village is located north of the town of Khampat in Tamu Township.

On 7 January 2024, Myanmar Air Force launched an air strike to the village killing least 17 civilians, including nine children, and injuring 20. But the military government denied it and claiming that it was false news.
