= Kanan, Osaka =

Kanan 河南町
- Town
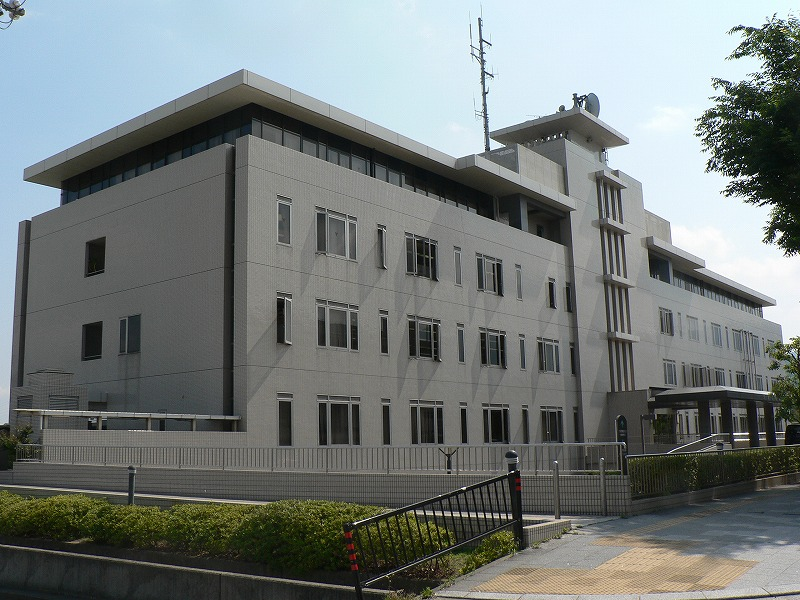
- Kanan town office

- Flag Emblem

- Location of Kanan in Osaka Prefecture

- Location in Japan
- Coordinates: 34°29′N 135°38′E
- Country: Japan
- Region: Kansai; Kinki
- Prefecture: Osaka
- District: Minamikawachi

Government
  - Mayor: Shōgo Morita

Area
  - Total: 25.26 km^{2} (9.75 sq mi)

Population (January 1, 2022)
  - Total: 15,429
  - Density: 610.8/km^{2} (1,582/sq mi)
- Time zone: UTC+09:00 (JST)
- Website: Official website
- Symbols
- Flower: Lilium
- Tree: Sakura

Kanan (河南町, Kanan-chō) is a town located in Minamikawachi District, Osaka Prefecture, Japan. As of 1 January 2022, the town had an estimated population of 15,429 and a population density of 610 persons per km^{2}. The total area of the town is 25.26 square kilometres (9.75 sq mi).

== Geography ==
Kanan is located in the southeastern part of Osaka Prefecture on the west side of Kongō Range and Katsuragi Mountains which separate Osaka from Nara Prefecture. It is approximately 25 kilometers from central Osaka City. The town is roughly square, measuring 7.5 kilometers east-to-west by 6.7 kilometers north-to-south. The landscape is hilly or mountainous, with about a third of the town area within the borders of Kongō-Ikoma-Kisen Quasi-National Park.

=== Neighboring municipalities ===
Nara Prefecture

- Katsuragi

Osaka Prefecture

- Chihayaakasaka
- Taishi
- Tondabayashi

== Climate ==
Kanan has a humid subtropical climate (Köppen Cfa) characterized by warm summers and cool winters with light to no snowfall.

== Demographics ==
Per Japanese census data, the population of Kanan has increased steadily since the 1970s.

Historical population
Year	Pop.	±%
1920	7,127	—
1930	7,193	+0.9%
1940	7,195	+0.0%
1950	9,424	+31.0%
1960	8,839	−6.2%
1970	8,941	+1.2%
1980	13,967	+56.2%
1990	14,588	+4.4%
2000	17,341	+18.9%
2010	17,032	−1.8%

== History ==
The area of the modern town of Kanan was within ancient Kawachi Province. The area has many kofun burial mounds and ancient Buddhist temples. The villages of Ishikawa, Shiraki, Kochi, and Nakamura were established within Ishikawa District with the creation of the modern municipalities system on April 1, 1889. On April 1, 1896, the area became part of Minamikawachi District, Osaka. The four villages merged on September 3, 1956, to form the town of Kanan.

== Government ==
Kanan has a mayor-council form of government with a directly elected mayor and a unicameral city council of 12 members. Kanan collectively with the cities of Tondabayashi and Ōsakasayama, and other municipalities of Minamikawachi District contributes two members to the Osaka Prefectural Assembly. In terms of national politics, the city is part of Osaka 15th district of the lower house of the Diet of Japan.

== Economy ==
Kanan was traditionally dependent on agriculture (eggplants, cucumbers) and forestry, with forests occupying half the town area. Manufacturing is centered around pulp and paper and paper-manufactured goods.

== Education ==
- University
  - Osaka University of Arts
- Middle school
  - Kanan Town Junior High School
- Elementary schools
  - Kanan Town Chikatsu-Asaka Elementary School
  - Kanan Town Kanan Sakura Elementary School

== Transportation ==
=== Railway ===
Kanan does not have any passenger rail service. The nearest station is Tondabayashi Station on the Kintetsu Nagano Line.

=== Highway ===
- National Route 309

== Local attractions ==
- Hirokawa-dera, Buddhist temple with grave of Saigyō
- Ichisuka Kofun Cluster, National Historic Site
- Kanayama Kofun, National Historic Site

== Notable people from Kanan ==
- Naokazu Takemoto, politician
