= Dul Rural District =

Rural district in West Azerbaijan province, Iran

Dul Rural District Persian: دهستان دول
- Rural District
- Location within Iran
- Coordinates: 37°15′N 45°19′E
- Country: Iran
- Province: West Azerbaijan
- County: Urmia
- District: Central
- Established: 1987
- Capital: Dizaj-e Dul

Population (2016)
  - Total: 7,487
- Time zone: UTC+3:30 (IRST)

Dul Rural District (Persian: دهستان دول) is in the Central District of Urmia County, West Azerbaijan province, Iran. Its capital is the village of Dizaj-e Dul.

== Demographics ==
=== Population ===
At the time of the 2006 National Census, the rural district's population was 8,524 in 1,974 households. There were 7,530 inhabitants in 2,076 households at the following census of 2011. The 2016 census measured the population of the rural district as 7,487 in 2,130 households. The most populous of its 27 villages was Dizaj-e Dul, with 768 people.

=== Other villages in the rural district ===
- Balestan
- Dalow
- Eslamabad
- Nanas
- Nari
- Ziveh
