= Kawachi-Iwafune Station =

Railway station in Katano, Osaka Prefecture, Japan

Kawachi-Iwafune Station 河内磐船駅
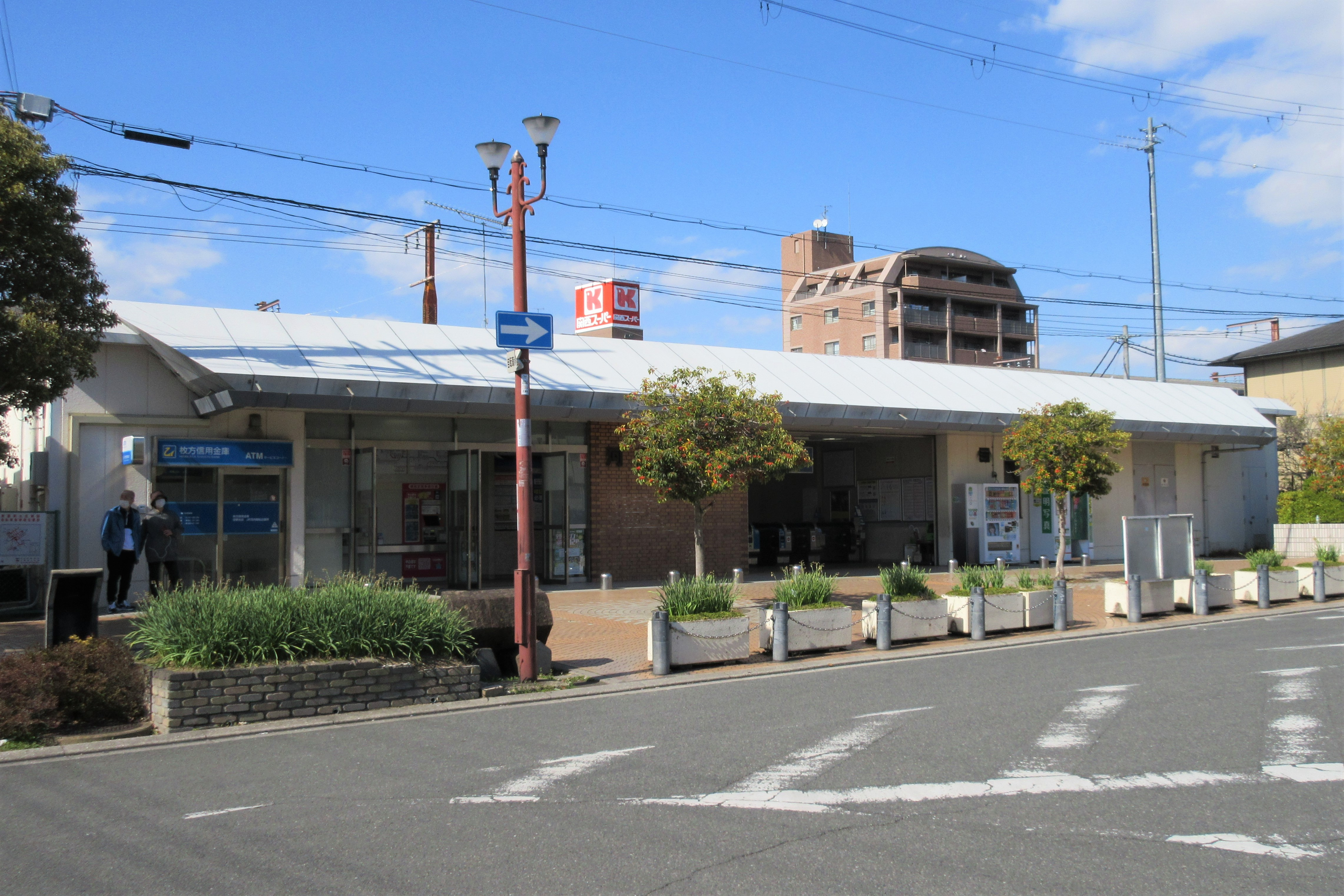
- Kawachi-Iwafune Station

General information
- Location: 1-6-7, Mori-Minami,, Kitano-shi, Osaka-fu 576-0031; Japan
- Coordinates: 34°46′34.78″N 135°41′4.26″E
- Operator: JR West
- Line: H Katamachi Line
- Distance: 25.0 km from Kizu
- Platforms: 2 side platforms
- Tracks: 2
- Connections: Bus stop

Construction
- Structure type: Ground level

Other information
- Status: Staffed (Midori no Madoguchi)
- Station code: JR-H30
- Website: Official website

History
- Opened: 2 December 1935

Passengers
- FY2019: 11,069 daily
Location
- Location within Osaka Prefecture Location within Japan

Kawachi-Iwafune Station (河内磐船駅, Kawachi-Iwafune-eki) is a passenger railway station in located in the city of Katano, Osaka Prefecture, Japan, operated by West Japan Railway Company (JR West).

== Lines ==
Kawachi-Iwafune Station is served by the Katamachi Line (Gakkentoshi Line), and is located 25.0 kilometres (15.5 miles) from the starting point of the line at Kizu Station.

== Station layout ==
The station has two opposed ground-level side platforms connected by an underground passage. The station has a Midori no Madoguchi staffed ticket office.

== Platforms ==
1	■ H KatamachiLine	for Shijōnawate and Kyōbashi
2	■ H Katamachi Line	for Matsuiyamate and Kizu

== Adjacent stations ==
«	Service	»
Katamachi Line (Gakkentoshi Line)
Nagao	Rapid Service	Hoshida
Tsuda	Regional Rapid Service	Hoshida
Tsuda	Local	Hoshida

== History ==
The station was opened on 2 December 1935.

Station numbering was introduced in March 2018 with Kawachi-Iwafune being assigned station number JR-H30.

== Passenger statistics ==
In fiscal 2019, the station was used by an average of 11,069 passengers daily (boarding passengers only).

== Surrounding area ==
- Kawachimori Station on the Keihan Katano Line is about 300m south of the station
- Katano City Health and Welfare Center
- "Ikiiki Land Katano" (Municipal General Gymnasium)
- Osaka Prefectural Katano High School
