= Ōsumi Station =

Railway station in Kyōtanabe, Kyoto Prefecture, Japan

Ōsumi Station 大住駅
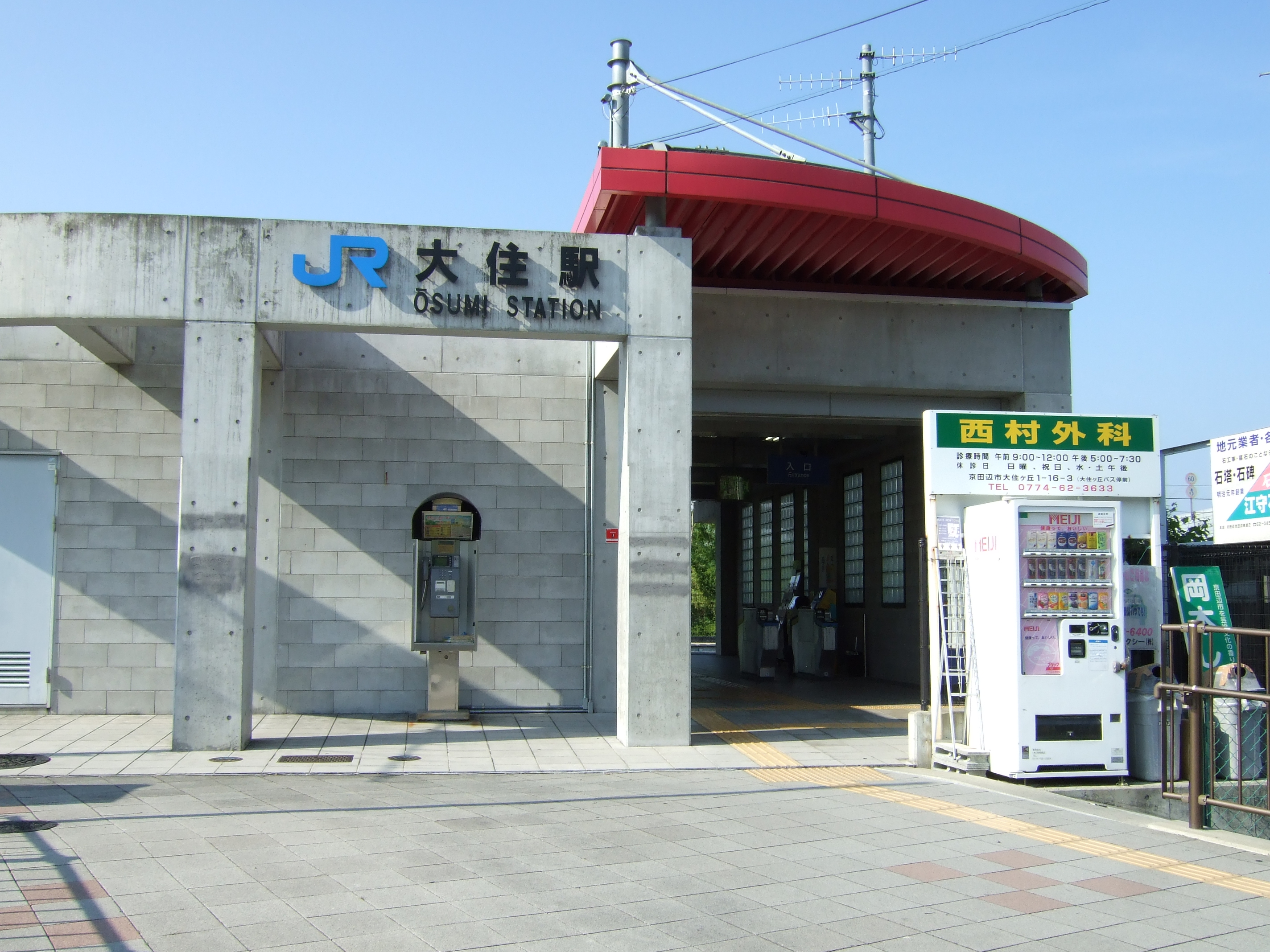
- Ōsumi Station building, August 2008

General information
- Location: 17, Ōsumi-Maruyama, Kyōtanabe-shi, Kyoto-fu 610-0343; Japan
- Coordinates: 34°49′50.47″N 135°44′57.8″E
- Operator: JR West
- Line: H Katamachi Line
- Distance: 14.5 km (9.0 miles) from Kizu
- Platforms: 2 side platforms
- Tracks: 2
- Connections: Bus terminal

Construction
- Structure type: At grade

Other information
- Station code: JR-H25
- Website: Official website

History
- Opened: 1 December 1952

Passengers
- FY 2023: 3,908 daily
Location
- Location within Kyoto Prefecture Location within Japan

Ōsumi Station (大住駅, Ōsumi-eki) is a passenger railway station located in the city of Kyōtanabe, Kyoto, Japan, operated by the West Japan Railway Company (JR West). There is a transfer at this station to the nearby Miyamaki Station on the Kintetsu Kyoto Line.

== Lines ==
Ōsumi Station is served by the Katamachi Line (Gakkentoshi Line), and is located at 14.5 km (9.0 miles) from the terminus of the line at Kizu.

== Layout ==
The station has two opposed side platforms connected by a footbridge. The station is staffed.

=== Platforms ===
1	■ H Katamachi Line (Gakkentoshi Line)	for Shijonawate and Kyobashi
2	■ H Katamachi Line (Gakkentoshi Line)	for Kizu

== Stations next to Ōsumi ==
«	Service	»
Katamachi Line (Gakkentoshi Line)
Kyōtanabe	Rapid Service	Matsuiyamate
Kyōtanabe	Regional Rapid Service	Matsuiyamate
Kyōtanabe	Local	Matsuiyamate

== History ==
Ōsumi Station opened on 1 December 1952. With the privatization of Japanese National Railways (JNR) on 1 April 1987, the station came under the control of JR West. It was renamed to its present name on 8 March 1997. Station numbering was introduced in March 2018 with Ōsumi being assigned station number JR-H25.

== Passenger statistics ==
In fiscal 2019, the station was used by an average of 1989 passengers daily.

== Surrounding area ==
- Tanabe Kita Interchange - E24 Keinawa Expressway
- Kyotanabe City Osumi Junior High School
- Kyotanabe City Osumi Elementary School
- Kyotanabe City Momoen Elementary School

== See also ==
- List of railway stations in Japan
