= Tokuan Station =

Railway station in Higashiōsaka, Osaka Prefecture, Japan

Tokuan Station 徳庵駅
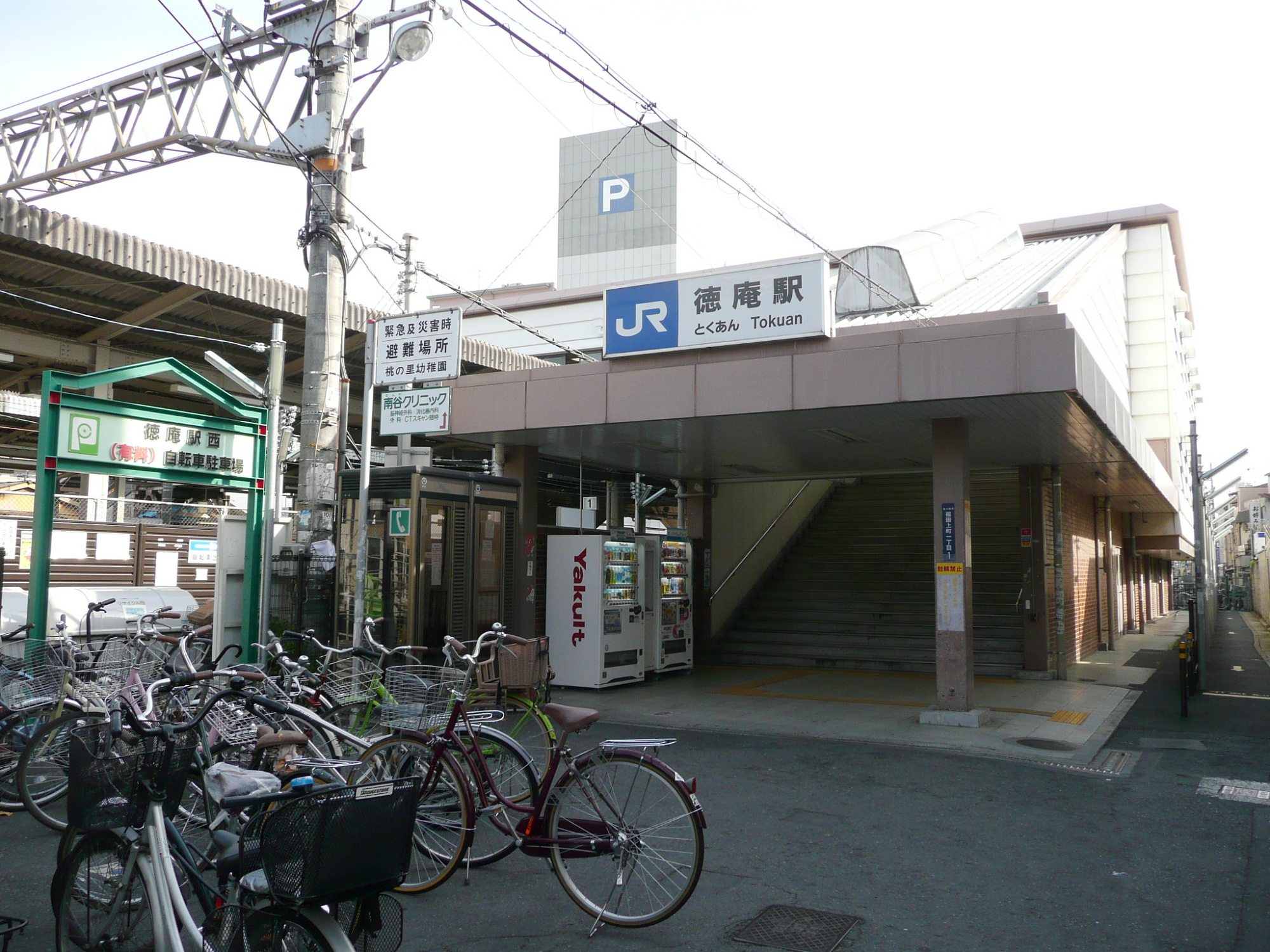
- Tokuan Station entrance, May 2008

General information
- Location: 1-19, Inada-Uemachi 1-chome, Higashiōsaka-shi, Osaka-fu 577-0002; Japan
- Coordinates: 34°41′32.77″N 135°34′52.81″E
- System: JR-West commuter rail station
- Operator: JR West; Japan Freight Railway Company
- Line: H Katamachi Line
- Distance: 39.2 km from Kizu
- Platforms: 1 side + 1 island platform
- Connections: Bus stop

Other information
- Status: Staffed
- Station code: JR-H38
- Website: Official website

History
- Opened: 22 August 1895

Passengers
- FY2019: 10,679 daily
Location
- Location within Osaka Prefecture Location within Japan

Tokuan Station (徳庵駅, Tokuan-eki) is a passenger railway station in located in the city of Higashiōsaka, Osaka Prefecture, Japan, operated by West Japan Railway Company (JR West). It is also the location of a freight depot of the Japan Freight Railway Company (JR Freight).

== Lines ==
Tokuan Station is served by the Katamachi Line (Gakkentoshi Line), and is located 39.8 km from the starting point of the line at Kizu Station.

== Station layout ==
The station has one ground-level side platform and one ground-level island platform, each capable of accommodating eight-car trains, with an elevated station building.

== Platforms ==
1	■ H KatamachiLine	for Kyōbashi, Kitashinchi and Amagasaki
2	■ H Katamachi Line	for Shijōnawate and Matsuiyamate
3	■ H Katamachi Line	(siding)

== Adjacent stations ==
«	Service	»
Katamachi Line (Gakkentoshi Line)
Rapid Service: Does not stop at this station
Regional Rapid Service: Does not stop at this station
Kōnoikeshinden	Local	Hanaten

== History ==
The station was opened on 22 August 1895.

Station numbering was introduced in March 2018 with Tokuan being assigned station number JR-H38.

== Passenger statistics ==
In fiscal 2019, the station was used by an average of 10,679 passengers daily (boarding passengers only).

== Surrounding area ==
- Tokuan Shopping Arcade
- Inada Shopping Arcade (Inada Plus Road)
- The Kinki Sharyo Co., Ltd.
