= Neyagawakōen Station =

Railway station in Neyagawa, Osaka Prefecture, Japan

Neyagawakōen Station 寝屋川公園駅
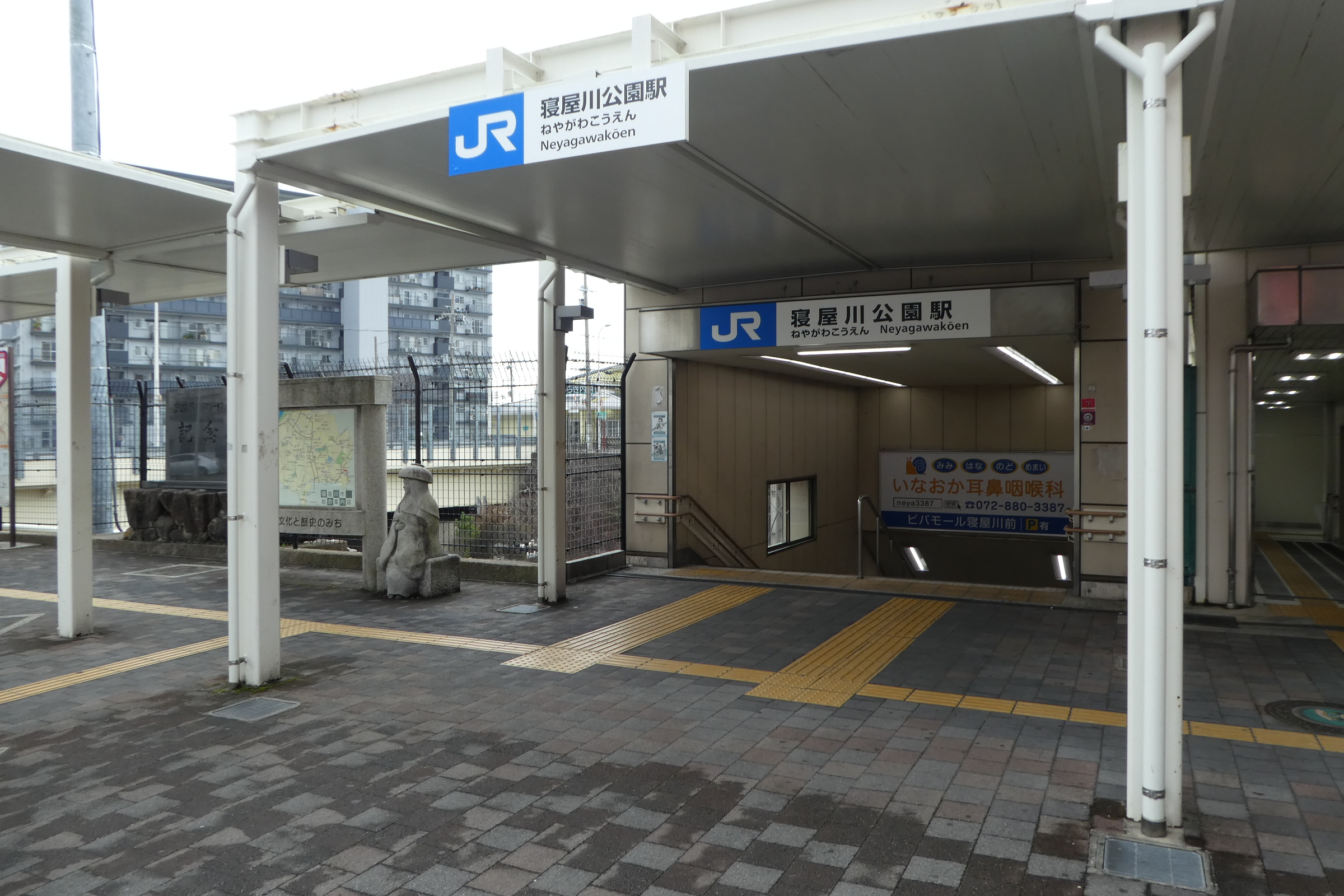
- Station building, March 2019

General information
- Location: 1-14 Uchiage-motomachi, Neyagawa-shi, Osaka-fu 572-0858; Japan
- Coordinates: 34°45′20.65″N 135°39′11.49″E
- Operator: JR West
- Line: H Katamachi Line
- Distance: 28.8 km from Kizu
- Platforms: 1 island platform
- Tracks: 2
- Connections: Bus stop

Other information
- Status: Staffed
- Station code: JR-H32
- Website: Official website

History
- Opened: 1 October 1978

Passengers
- FY2019: 4,381 daily
Location
- Location within Osaka Prefecture Location within Japan

Neyagawakōen Station (寝屋川公園駅, Neyagawa-kōen-eki) is a passenger railway station located in the city of Neyagawa, Osaka Prefecture, Japan, operated by West Japan Railway Company (JR West).

== Lines ==
Neyagawakōen Station is served by the Katamachi Line (Gakkentoshi Line), and is located 28.8 kilometres (17.9 miles) from the starting point of the line at Kizu Station.

== Station layout ==
The station has one ground-level island platform in a cutting with the station building on higher ground and connected to the platform by an elevator. The station is staffed.

== Platforms ==
1	■ H KatamachiLine	for Kyōbashi, Kitashinchi and Amagasaki
2	■ H Katamachi Line	for Shijōnawate and Matsuiyamate

== Adjacent stations ==
«	Service	»
Katamachi Line (Gakkentoshi Line)
Rapid: Does not stop at this station
Hoshida	Regional Rapid	Shinobugaoka
Hoshida	Local	Shinobugaoka

== History ==
The station was opened on 1 October 1979 as Higashi-Neyagawa Station (東寝屋川駅). The station changed its name to the present one on 16 March 2019.

Station numbering was introduced in March 2018 with Neyagawakōen being assigned station number JR-H32.

== Passenger statistics ==
In fiscal 2019, the station was used by an average of 4,381 passengers daily (boarding passengers only).

== Surrounding area ==
- Neyagawa Park
- Osaka Fukujuji Hospital
- Ishinohoden Kofun
- Neyagawa Municipal Fourth Junior High School
- Neyagawa City Meiwa Elementary School
- Neyagawa City Umegaoka Elementary School
