= Fujisaka Station =

Railway station in Hirakata, Osaka Prefecture, Japan

Fujisaka Station 藤阪駅
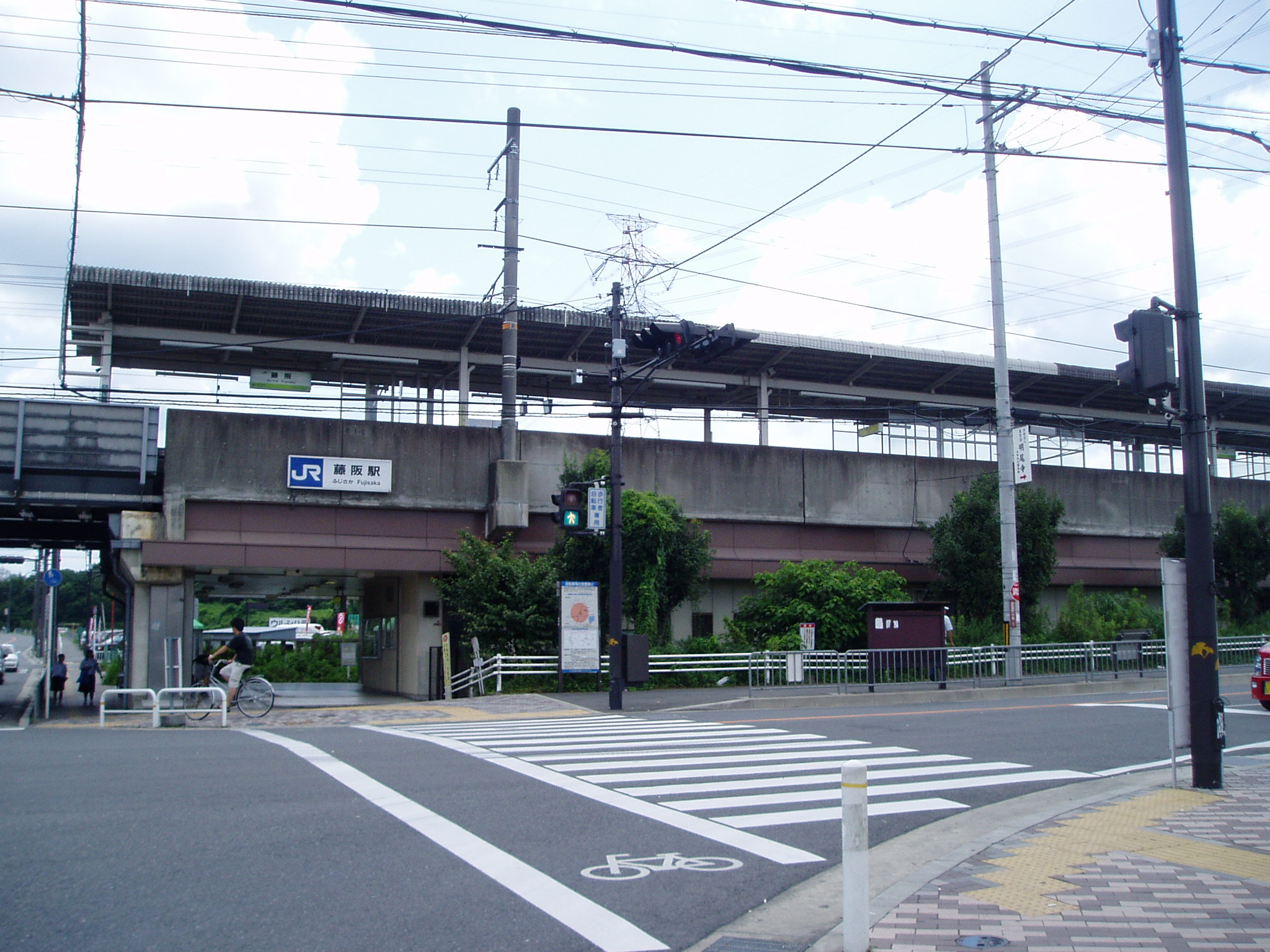
- Fujisaka Station building in 2006

General information
- Location: 2-1-1, Fujisaka-Minamimachi, Hirakata-shi, Osaka-fu 573-0156; Japan
- Coordinates: 34.814359°N 135.702783°E
- Operator: JR West
- Line: H Katamachi Line
- Distance: 20.2 km from Kizu
- Platforms: 1 island platform
- Tracks: 2
- Connections: Bus stop

Construction
- Structure type: Elevated

Other information
- Status: Staffed
- Station code: JR-H28
- Website: Official website

History
- Opened: 1 October 1979

Passengers
- FY2019: 3,216 daily
Location
- Location within Osaka Prefecture Location within Japan

Fujisaka Station (藤阪駅, Fujisaka-eki) is a passenger railway station in located in the city of Hirakata, Osaka Prefecture, Japan, operated by West Japan Railway Company (JR West).

== Lines ==
Fujisaka Station is served by the Katamachi Line (Gakkentoshi Line), and is located 20.2 kilometers from the starting point of the line at Kizu Station.

== Station layout ==
The station has a single elevated island platform with the station building underneath. The station is staffed.

== Platforms ==
1	■ H KatamachiLine	for Matsuiyamate and Kizu
2	■ H Katamachi Line	for Shijōnawate and Kyōbashi

== Adjacent stations ==
«	Service	»
Katamachi Line (Gakkentoshi Line)
Rapid Service: Does not stop at this station
Nagao	Regional Rapid Service	Tsuda
Nagao	Local	Tsuda

== History ==
The station was opened on 1 October 1979.

Station numbering was introduced in March 2018 with Fujisaka being assigned station number JR-H28.

== Passenger statistics ==
In fiscal 2019, the station was used by an average of 3,216 passengers daily (boarding passengers only).

== Surrounding area ==
- Japan National Route 307
- Hotani River
- Hirakata City Hall Tsuda Branch
- Hirakata City Tsuda Library
- Hirakata City Tsuda Public Hall
