= Tsuda Station =

Railway station in Hirakata, Osaka Prefecture, Japan

Tsuda Station 津田駅
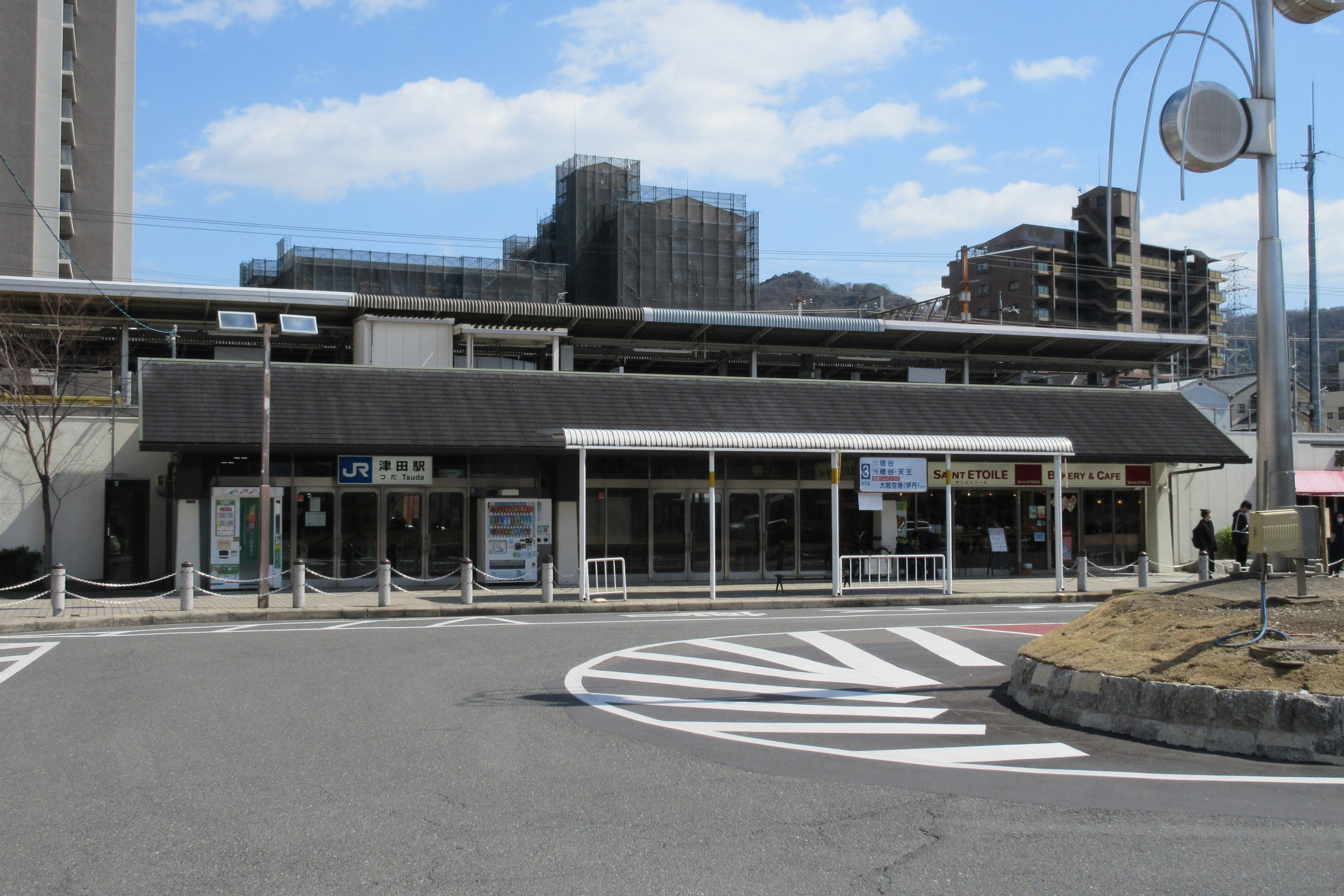
- Tsuda Station

General information
- Location: 1-21-1, Tsuda-ekimae, Hirakata-shi, Osaka-fu 573-0125; Japan
- Coordinates: 34°48′4.2″N 135°41′51.4″E
- Operator: JR West
- Line: H Katamachi Line
- Distance: 21.8 km from Kizu
- Platforms: 2 island platforms
- Connections: Bus stop

Construction
- Structure type: Ground level

Other information
- Status: Staffed
- Station code: JR-H29
- Website: Official website

History
- Opened: 12 April 1898

Passengers
- FY2019: 5,646 daily
Location
- Location within Osaka Prefecture Location within Japan

Tsuda Station (津田駅, Tsuda-eki) is a passenger railway station in located in the city of Hirakata, Osaka Prefecture, Japan, operated by West Japan Railway Company (JR West).

== Lines ==
Tsuda Station is served by the Katamachi Line (Gakkentoshi Line), and is located 21.8 kilometres (13.5 miles) from the starting point of the line at Kizu Station.

== Station layout ==
The station has a two elevated island platforms with the station building underneath. Only the middle platforms are in use, with the outer platforms on dead-headed sidings. The station is staffed.

== Platforms ==
1	■ H KatamachiLine	for Matsuiyamate and Kizu
2	■ H Katamachi Line	for Shijōnawate and Kyōbashi

== Adjacent stations ==
«	Service	»
Katamachi Line (Gakkentoshi Line)
Rapid Service: Does not stop at this station
Fujisaka	Regional Rapid Service	Kawachi-Iwafune
Fujisaka	Local	Kawachi-Iwafune

== History ==
The station was opened on 12 April 1898.

Station numbering was introduced in March 2018 with Tsuda being assigned station number JR-H29.

== Passenger statistics ==
In fiscal 2019, the station was used by an average of 5,646 passengers daily (boarding passengers only).

== Surrounding area ==
- Japan National Route 307
- Hirakata City Tsuda Elementary School
- Hirakata City Tsuda Minami Elementary School
