= Kōnoikeshinden Station =

Railway station in Higashiōsaka, Osaka Prefecture, Japan

Kōnoikeshinden Station 鴻池新田駅
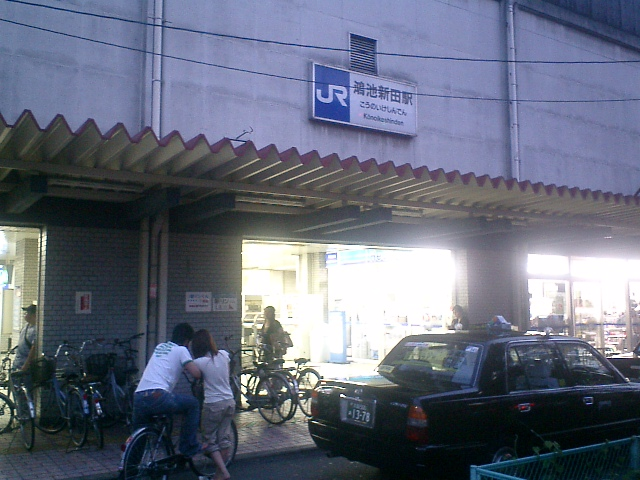
- Kōnoikeshinden Station in 2005

General information
- Location: 1, Nishi Kōnoike, Higashiōsaka, Osaka-fu 578-0976; Japan
- Coordinates: 34.6987°N 135.5975°E
- System: JR-West commuter rail station
- Operator: JR West
- Line: H Katamachi Line
- Platforms: 2 side platforms
- Tracks: 2
- Connections: Bus terminal

Other information
- Status: Staffed (Midori no Madoguchi)
- Station code: JR-H37
- Website: Official website

History
- Opened: 21 April 1912

Passengers
- FY2019: 13,584 daily
Location
- Location within Osaka Prefecture Location within Japan

Kōnoikeshinden Station (鴻池新田駅, Kōnoikeshinden-eki) is a passenger railway station in located in the city of Higashiōsaka, Osaka Prefecture, Japan, operated by West Japan Railway Company (JR West).

== Lines ==
Kōnoikeshinden Station is served by the Katamachi Line (Gakkentoshi Line), and is located 37.9 kilometres (23.5 miles) from the starting point of the line at Kizu Station.

== Station layout ==
The station has two elevated side platforms, each capable of accommodating eight-car trains, with the station building underneath. The station has a Midori no Madoguchi staffed ticket office.

== Platforms ==
| 1 | ■ H KatamachiLine | for Kyōbashi, Kitashinchi and Amagasaki |
| 2 | ■ H Katamachi Line | for Shijōnawate and Matsuiyamate |

== Adjacent stations ==
| « | Service | » |
Katamachi Line (Gakkentoshi Line)
Rapid Service: Does not stop at this station
Regional Rapid Service: Does not stop at this station
| Suminodō | Local | Tokuan |

== History ==
The station was opened on 21 April 1912.

Station numbering was introduced in March 2018 with Kōnoikeshinden being assigned station number JR-H37.

=== Future plans ===
Osaka Monorail will be extended to the station in 2029.

== Passenger statistics ==
In fiscal 2019, the station was used by an average of 13,584 passengers daily (boarding passengers only).

== Surrounding area ==
- Kōnoike Shinden kaisho
- Taisei Gakuin University (Koike Sports Campus)
- Taisei Gakuin University Junior and Senior High School
- Osaka Prefectural Joto Technical High School
