= Hoshida Station =

Railway station in Katano, Osaka Prefecture, Japan

Hoshida Station 星田駅
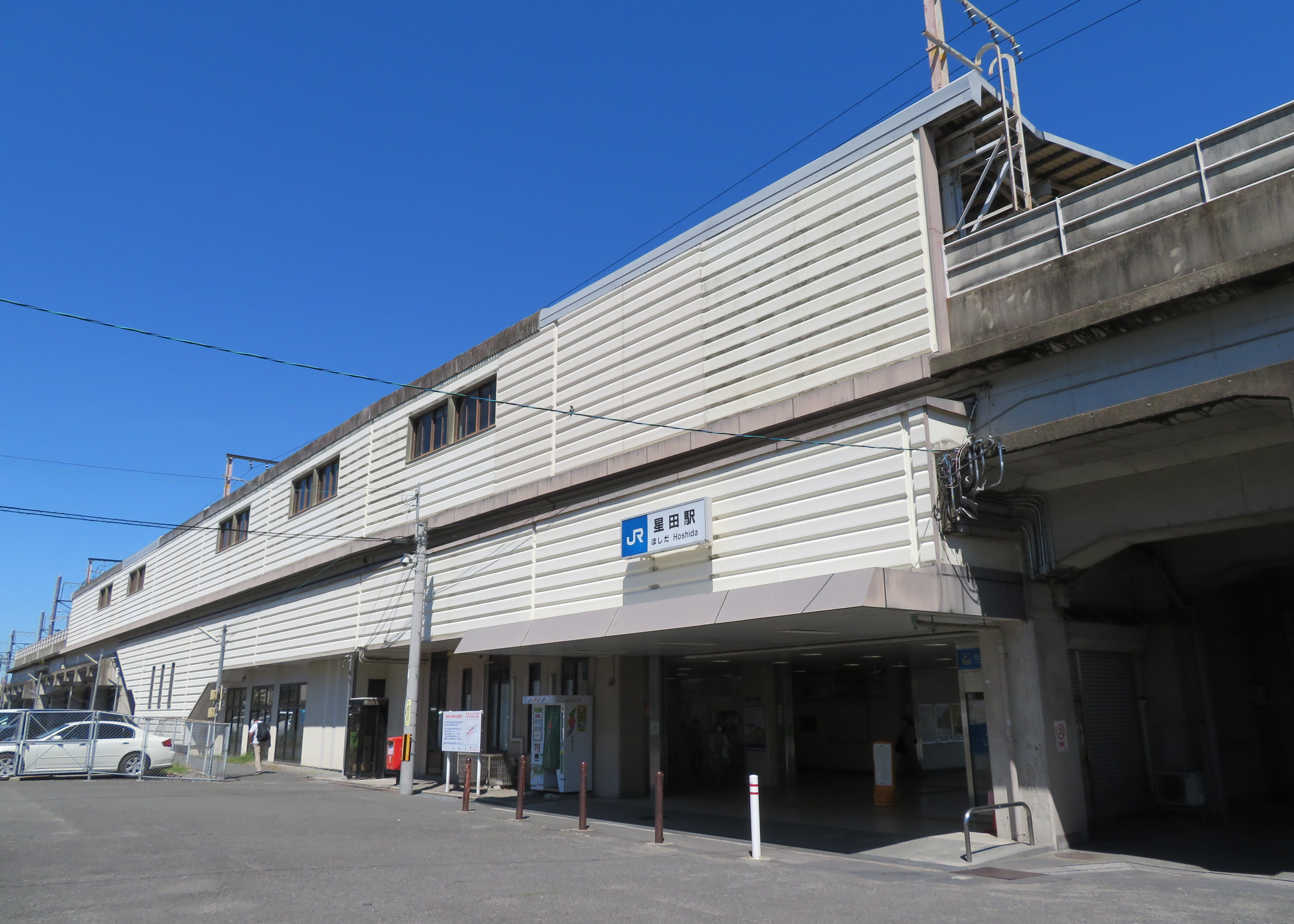
- Hoshida Station, June 2020

General information
- Location: 5-chōme-11 Hoshida, Katano-shi, Osaka-fu 576-0016; Japan
- Coordinates: 34°46′2.33″N 135°39′48.99″E
- Operator: JR West
- Line: H Katamachi Line
- Distance: 27.1 km from Kizu
- Platforms: 2 side platforms
- Tracks: 2
- Connections: Bus stop

Construction
- Structure type: Elevated

Other information
- Status: Staffed (Midori no Madoguchi)
- Station code: JR-H31
- Website: Official website

History
- Opened: 1 July 1898

Passengers
- FY2019: 8,145 daily
Location
- Location within Osaka Prefecture Location within Japan

Hoshida Station (星田駅, Hoshida-eki) is a passenger railway station in located in the city of Katano, Osaka Prefecture, Japan, operated by West Japan Railway Company (JR West).

== Lines ==
Hoshida Station is served by the Katamachi Line (Gakkentoshi Line), and is located 27.1 kilometers from the starting point of the line at Kizu Station.

== Station layout ==
The station has two opposed elevated side platforms with the station building underneath. The station has a Midori no Madoguchi staffed ticket office.

== Platforms ==
1	■ H KatamachiLine	for Shijōnawate and Kyōbashi
2	■ H Katamachi Line	for Matsuiyamate and Kizu

== Adjacent stations ==
«	Service	»
Katamachi Line (Gakkentoshi Line)
Kawachi-Iwafune	Rapid Service	Shijonawate
Kawachi-Iwafune	Regional Rapid Service	Neyagawa-Kōen
Kawachi-Iwafune	Local	Neyagawa-Kōen

== History ==
The station was opened on 1 July 1898.

Station numbering was introduced in March 2018 with Hoshida being assigned station number JR-H31.

== Passenger statistics ==
In fiscal 2019, the station was used by an average of 8,145 passengers daily (boarding passengers only).

== Surrounding area ==
- Hoshida Citizen Center (Katano City Office Hoshida Branch Office)
- Osaka Prefectural Kita Kawachi Satsuki High School
- Katano City Hoshida Elementary School
