= Hōsono Station =

Railway station in Seika, Kyoto Prefecture, Japan

Hōsono Station 祝園駅
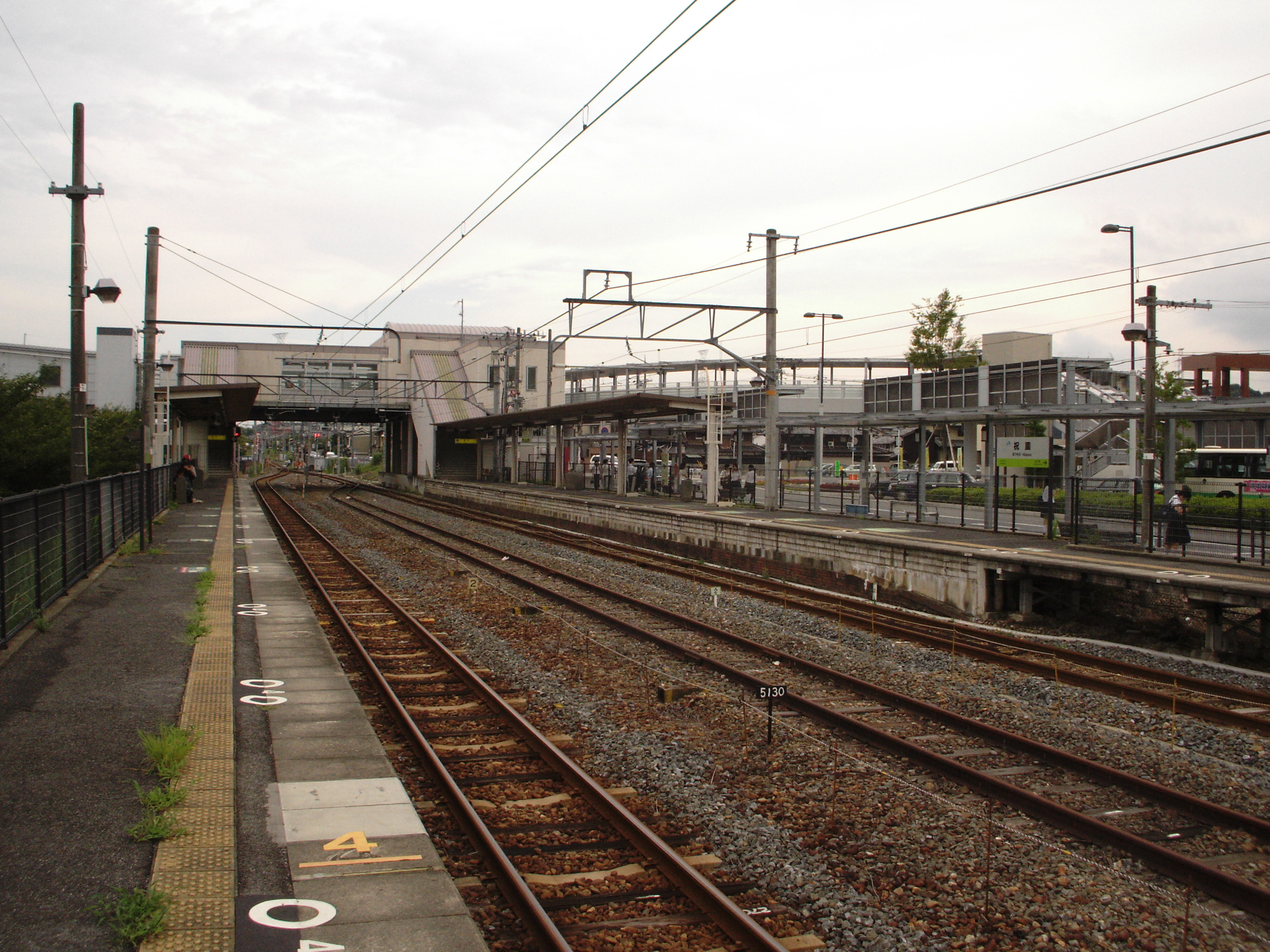
- Housono Station platform

General information
- Location: 1-50, Nagatsuka, Hosono, Seika-cho, Soraku-gun, Kyoto-fu 619-0240; Japan
- Coordinates: 34°45′35.88″N 135°47′30.98″E
- Operator: JR West
- Line: H Katamachi Line
- Distance: 5.1 km (3.2 miles) from Kizu
- Platforms: 2 side platforms
- Connections: Bus terminal

Construction
- Structure type: elevated

Other information
- Station code: JR-H20
- Website: Official website

History
- Opened: 4 June 1898

Passengers
- FY 2023: 4,062 daily
Location
- Location within Kyoto Prefecture Location within Japan

Hōsono Station (祝園駅, Hōsono-eki) is a passenger railway station located in the town of Seika, Soraku District, Kyoto Prefecture, Japan. It is operated by West Japan Railway Company (JR West) and there is a transfer at this station to the nearby Shin-Hōsono Station on Kintetsu Kyoto Line.

== Lines ==
Shimokoma Station is served by the Katamachi Line (Gakkentoshi Line), and is located at 5.1 km (3.2 miles) from the terminus of the line at Kizu.

== Layout ==
The station has two opposed side platforms with an elevated station building. The station is staffed.

=== Platforms ===
1	■ H Katamachi Line (Gakkentoshi Line)	for Shijonawate and Kyobashi
2	■ H Katamachi Line (Gakkentoshi Line)	for Kizu

== Stations next to Hōsono ==
«	Service	»
Katamachi Line (Gakkentoshi Line)
Nishi-Kizu	Rapid Service	Shimokoma
Nishi-Kizu	Regional Rapid Service	Shimokoma
Nishi-Kizu	Local	Shimokoma

== History ==
Hōsono Station opened on 4 June 1898 as a station on the Kansai Railway. The Kansai Railway was nationalized in 1907 and the line renamed the Sakuranomiya Line in 1909. The Sakuranomiya Line was incorporated into the Katamachi Line in 1913. With the privatization of Japanese National Railways (JNR) on 1 April 1987, the station came under the control of JR West. Station numbering was introduced in March 2018 with Hōsono being assigned station number JR-H20.

== Passenger statistics ==
In fiscal 2019, the station was used by an average of 2328 passengers daily.

== Surrounding area ==
- Shin-Hōsono Station - Kintetsu Kyoto Line
- Seika Town Hall
- Seika Town Library - A book return post is also installed in front of the Kintetsu ticket gate.
- Seika Town National Health Insurance Hospital
- Seika Town Seika Junior High School

== See also ==
- List of railway stations in Japan
