= Nagao Station (Osaka) =

Railway station in Hirakata, Osaka Prefecture, Japan

Nagao Station 長尾駅
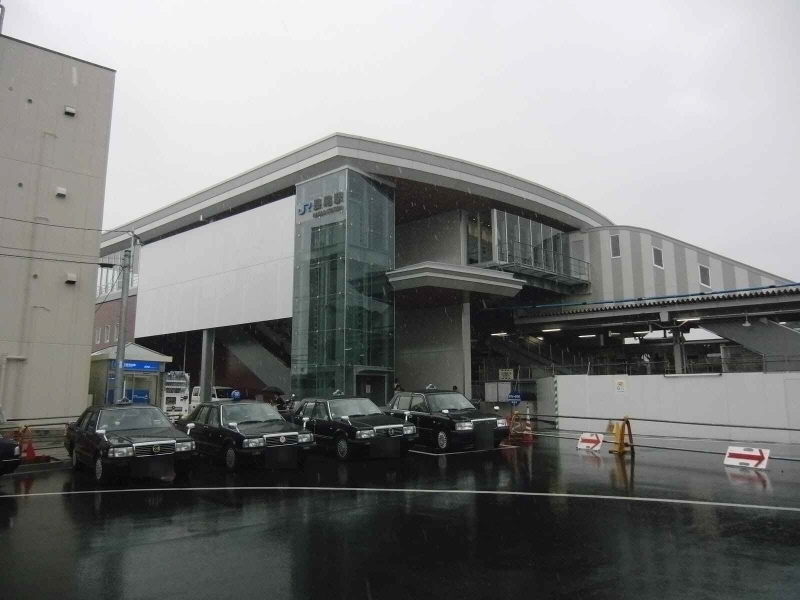
- Nagao Station

General information
- Location: 21-1, Nagaomotomachi 5-chōme, Hirakata-shi, Osaka-fu 573-0163; Japan
- Coordinates: 34°49′34″N 135°42′46″E
- Operator: JR West
- Line: H Katamachi Line
- Distance: 18.6 km from Kizu
- Platforms: 1 island platform
- Connections: Bus stop

Other information
- Status: Staffed (Midori no Madoguchi)
- Station code: JR-H27
- Website: Official website

History
- Opened: 12 April 1898

Passengers
- FY2019: 11,444 daily
Location
- Location within Osaka Prefecture Location within Japan

Nagao Station (長尾駅, Nagao-eki) is a passenger railway station in located in the city of Hirakata, Osaka Prefecture, Japan, operated by West Japan Railway Company (JR West).

== Lines ==
Nagao Station is served by the Katamachi Line (Gakkentoshi Line), and is located 18.6 kilometres (11.6 miles) from the starting point of the line at Kizu Station.

== Station layout ==
The station has a single ground-level island platform with an elevated station building. The station has a Midori no Madoguchi staffed ticket office.

== Platforms ==
1	■ H KatamachiLine	for Matsuiyamate and Kizu
2	■ H Katamachi Line	for Shijōnawate and Kyōbashi

== Adjacent stations ==
«	Service	»
Katamachi Line (Gakkentoshi Line)
Matsuiyamate	Rapid Service	Kawachi-Iwafune
Matsuiyamate	Regional Rapid Service	Fujisaka
Matsuiyamate	Local	Fujisaka

== History ==
The station was opened on 12 April 1898.

Station numbering was introduced in March 2018 with Dojo being assigned station number JR-H27.

== Passenger statistics ==
In fiscal 2019, the station was used by an average of 11,444 passengers daily (boarding passengers only).

== Surrounding area ==
- Tomb of Wani
- Shoshun-ji Temple
- Sugawara Shrine
- Osaka Institute of Technology Hirakata Campus
- Osaka Prefectural Nagao High School
