= Shinobugaoka Station =

Railway station in Shijōnawate, Osaka Prefecture, Japan

Shinobugaoka Station 忍ヶ丘駅
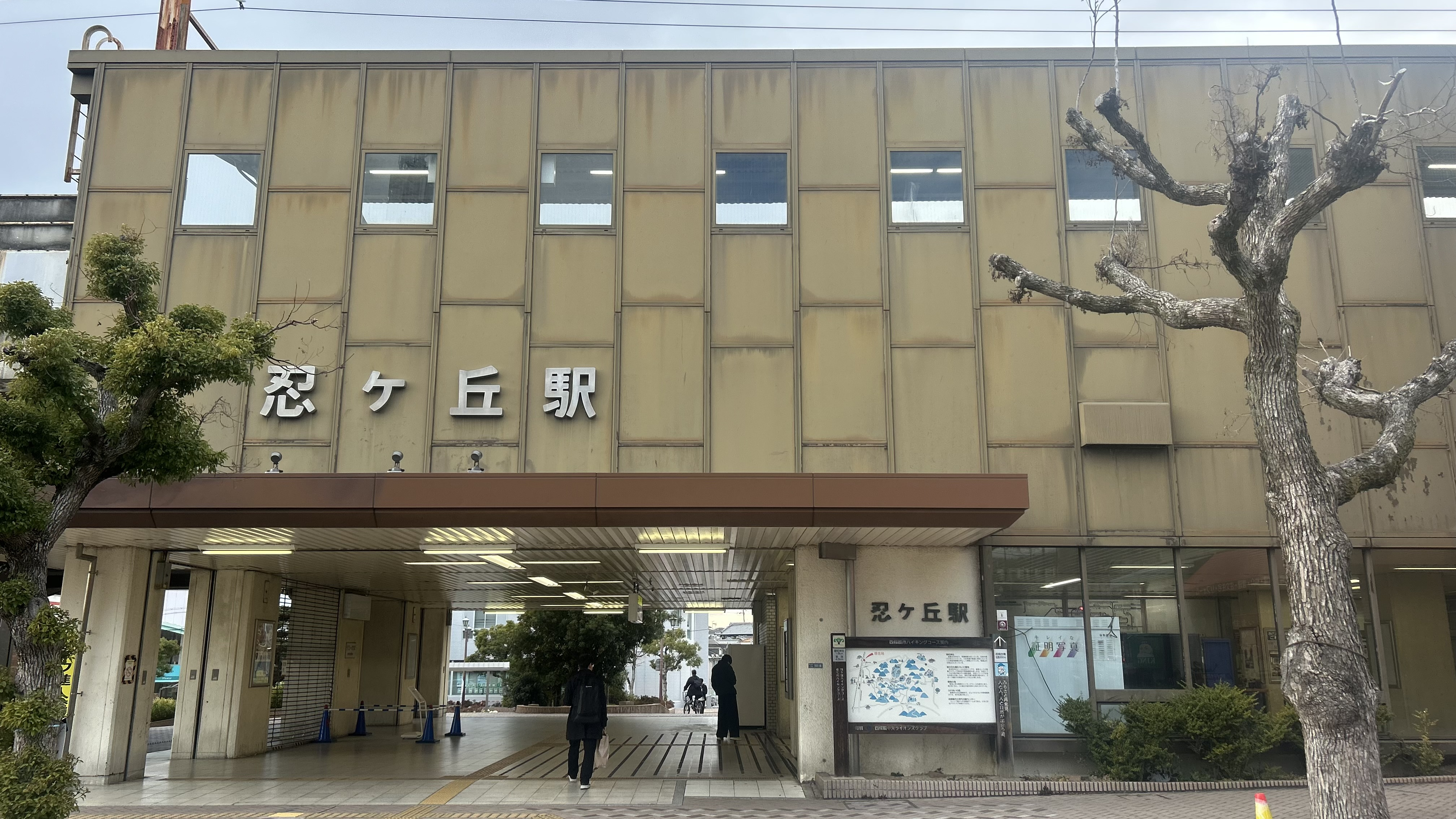
- Shinobugaoka Station building

General information
- Location: 1, Okayama-Higashi, Shijōnawate-shi, Osaka-fu 575-0003; Japan
- Coordinates: 34°44′45.29″N 135°38′43.98″E
- Operator: JR West
- Line: H Katamachi Line
- Distance: 30.1 km from Kizu
- Platforms: 2 side platforms
- Tracks: 2
- Connections: Bus stop

Other information
- Status: Staffed
- Station code: JR-H33
- Website: Official website

History
- Opened: 1 May 1953

Passengers
- FY2019: 8,783 daily
Location
- Location within Osaka Prefecture Location within Japan

Shinobugaoka Station (忍ケ丘駅, Shinobugaoka-eki) is a passenger railway station in located in the city of Shijōnawate, Osaka Prefecture, Japan, operated by West Japan Railway Company (JR West).

== Lines ==
Shinobugaoka Station is served by the Katamachi Line (Gakkentoshi Line), and is located 30.1 kilometres (18.7 miles)from the starting point of the line at Kizu Station.

== Station layout ==
The station has two elevated side platforms with the station building underneath. The station is staffed.

== Platforms ==
1	■ H KatamachiLine	for Kyōbashi, Kitashinchi and Amagasaki
2	■ H Katamachi Line	for Kizu and Matsuiyamate

== Adjacent stations ==
«	Service	»
Katamachi Line (Gakkentoshi Line)
Rapid Service: Does not stop at this station
Neyagawa-Kōen	Regional Rapid Service	Shijōnawate
Higashi-Neyagawa	Local	Shijōnawate

== History ==
The station was opened on 1 May 1953.

Station numbering was introduced in March 2018 with Shinobugaoka being assigned station number JR-H33.

== Passenger statistics ==
In fiscal 2019, the station was used by an average of 8,783 passengers daily (boarding passengers only).

== Surrounding area ==
- Shinobugaoka Shrine
- Shinobugaoka Kofun
