= Suminodō Station =

Railway station in Daitō, Osaka Prefecture, Japan

Suminodō Station 住道駅
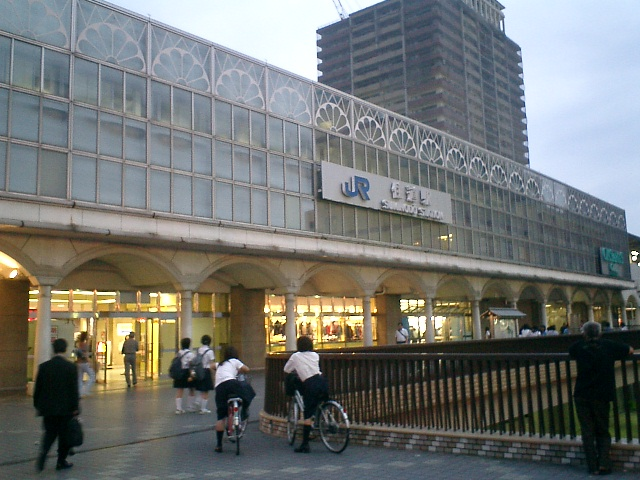
- Suminodō Station

General information
- Location: 2-3 Suminodō, Daitō-shi, Osaka-fu 574-0026; Japan
- Coordinates: 34°42′22.51″N 135°37′16.24″E
- Operator: JR West
- Line: H Katamachi Line
- Distance: 35.5 km from Kizu
- Platforms: 2 island platforms
- Tracks: 4
- Connections: Bus stop

Construction
- Structure type: Elevated

Other information
- Status: Staffed (Midori no Madoguchi)
- Station code: JR-H36
- Website: Official website

History
- Opened: 22 August 1895

Passengers
- FY2019: 30,999 daily
Location
- Location within Osaka Prefecture Location within Japan

Suminodō Station (住道駅, Suminodō-eki) is a passenger railway station in located in the city of Daitō, Osaka Prefecture, Japan, operated by West Japan Railway Company (JR West).

== Lines ==
Suminodō Station is served by the Katamachi Line (Gakkentoshi Line), and is located 35.5 kilometres (22.1 miles) from the starting point of the line at Kizu Station.

== Station layout ==
The station has two elevated island platforms with the station building underneath. The station has a Midori no Madoguchi staffed ticket office.

== Platforms ==
1, 2	■ H KatamachiLine	for Kyōbashi, Kitashinchi and Amagasaki
3, 4	■ H Katamachi Line	for Shijōnawate and Matsuiyamate

== Adjacent stations ==
«	Service	»
Katamachi Line (Gakkentoshi Line)
Shijōnawate	Rapid Service	Hanaten
Shijōnawate	Regional Rapid Service	Hanaten
Nozaki	Local	Kōnoikeshinden

== History ==
The station was opened on 22 August 1895.

Station numbering was introduced in March 2018 with Suminodō being assigned station number JR-H36.

== Passenger statistics ==
In fiscal 2019, the station was used by an average of 30,999 passengers daily (boarding passengers only).

== Surrounding area ==
- Daito City Hall
- Daito City Civic Hall
- Daito City Suminodo Junior High School
- Daito City Suminodokita Elementary School
- Daito City Suminodominami Elementary School
