= Kyōtanabe Station =

Railway station in Kyōtanabe, Kyoto Prefecture, Japan

Kyōtanabe Station 京田辺駅
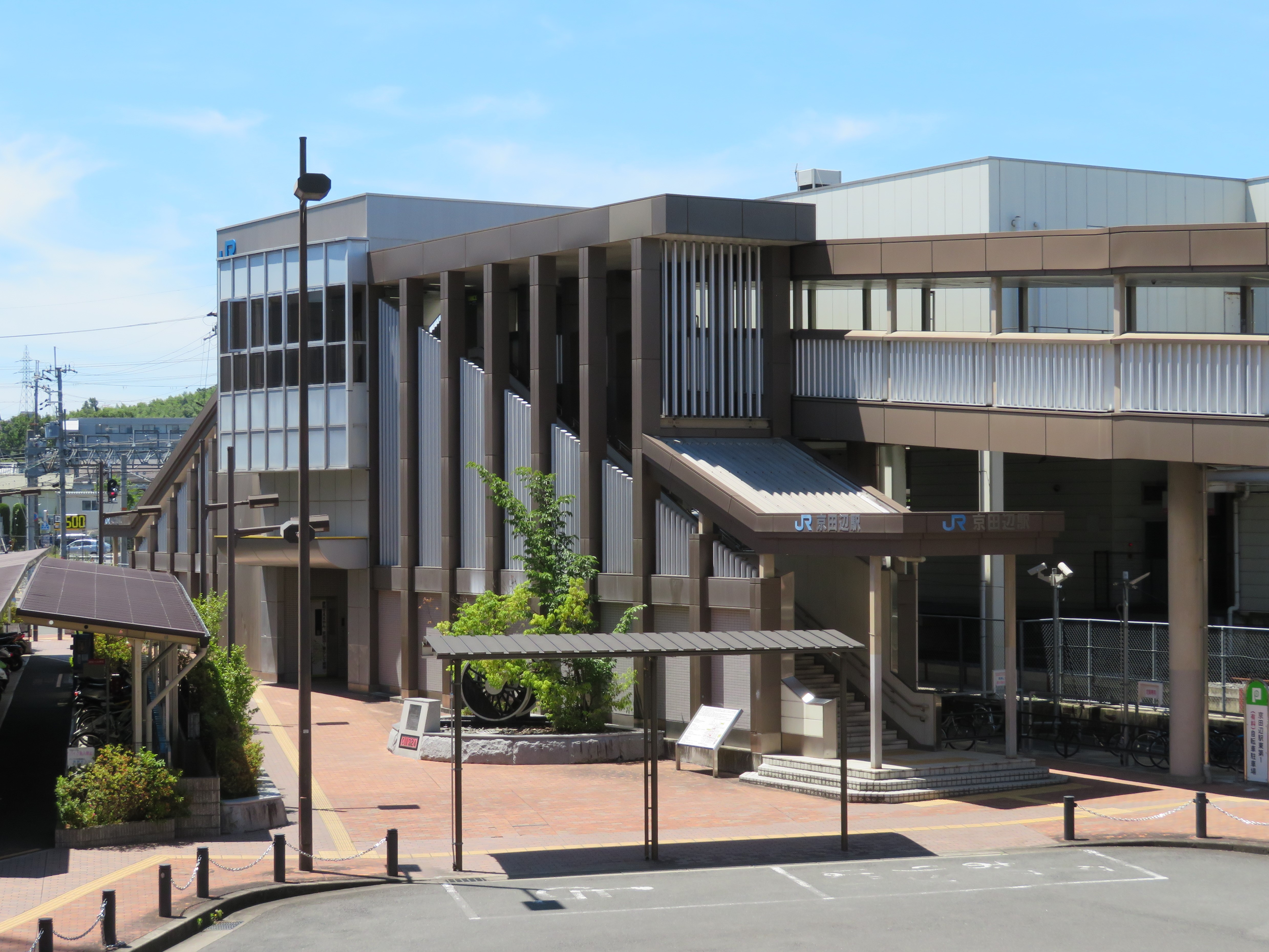
- Kyōtanabe Station, June 2020

General information
- Location: Tanabekudo, Kyōtanabe-shi, Kyoto-fu 610-0331; Japan
- Coordinates: 34°49′14.80″N 135°46′7.84″E
- Operator: JR West
- Line: H Katamachi Line
- Distance: 12.4 km (7.7 miles) from Kizu
- Platforms: 1 island + 1 side platform
- Tracks: 2
- Connections: Bus terminal

Construction
- Structure type: Elevated

Other information
- Station code: JR-H24
- Website: Official website

History
- Opened: 12 April 1898
- Former names: Tanabe (to 1997)

Passengers
- FY 2023: 12,020 daily
Location
- Location within Kyoto Prefecture Location within Japan

Kyōtanabe Station (京田辺駅, Kyōtanabe-eki) is a passenger railway station located in the city of Kyōtanabe, Kyoto, Japan, operated by the West Japan Railway Company (JR West). There is a transfer to the nearby Shin-Tanabe Station on the Kintetsu Kyoto Line.

== Lines ==
Kyōtanabe Station is served by the Katamachi Line (Gakkentoshi Line), and is located at 12.4 km (7.7 miles) from the terminus of the line at Kizu.

== Layout ==
The station has one island platform and one side platform, connected by an elevated station building. The station has a Midori no Madoguchi staffed ticket office. On the east side of the station, there is a pair of driving wheels and a license plate of a JNR Class C11 steam locomotive. This is from Unit 324, which was once statically preserved here. The locomotive itself has been relocated to the Kyoto Railway Museum.

=== Platforms ===
1, 2	■ H Katamachi Line (Gakkentoshi Line)	for Shijonawate and Kyobashi
3	■ H Katamachi Line (Gakkentoshi Line)	for Kizu

== Stations next to Kyōtanabe ==
«	Service	»
Katamachi Line (Gakkentoshi Line)
Dōshishamae	Rapid Service	Ōsumi
Dōshishamae	Regional Rapid Service	Ōsumi
Dōshishamae	Local	Ōsumi

== History ==
Kyōtanabe Station opened on 12 April 1898 as Tanabe Station (田辺駅) on the Kansai Railway. The Kansai Railway was nationalized in 1907. With the privatization of Japanese National Railways (JNR) on 1 April 1987, the station came under the control of JR West. It was renamed to its present name on 8 March 1997. Station numbering was introduced in March 2018 with Kyōtanabe being assigned station number JR-H24.

== Passenger statistics ==
In fiscal 2019, the station was used by an average of 6399 passengers daily.

== Surrounding area ==
- Kyotanabe City Hall
- Kyoto Prefectural Tanabe General Government Building
- Shin-Tanabe Station
- Ikkyūji Temple

== See also ==
- List of railway stations in Japan
