= Nozaki Station (Osaka) =

Railway station in Daitō, Osaka Prefecture, Japan

Nozaki Station 野崎駅
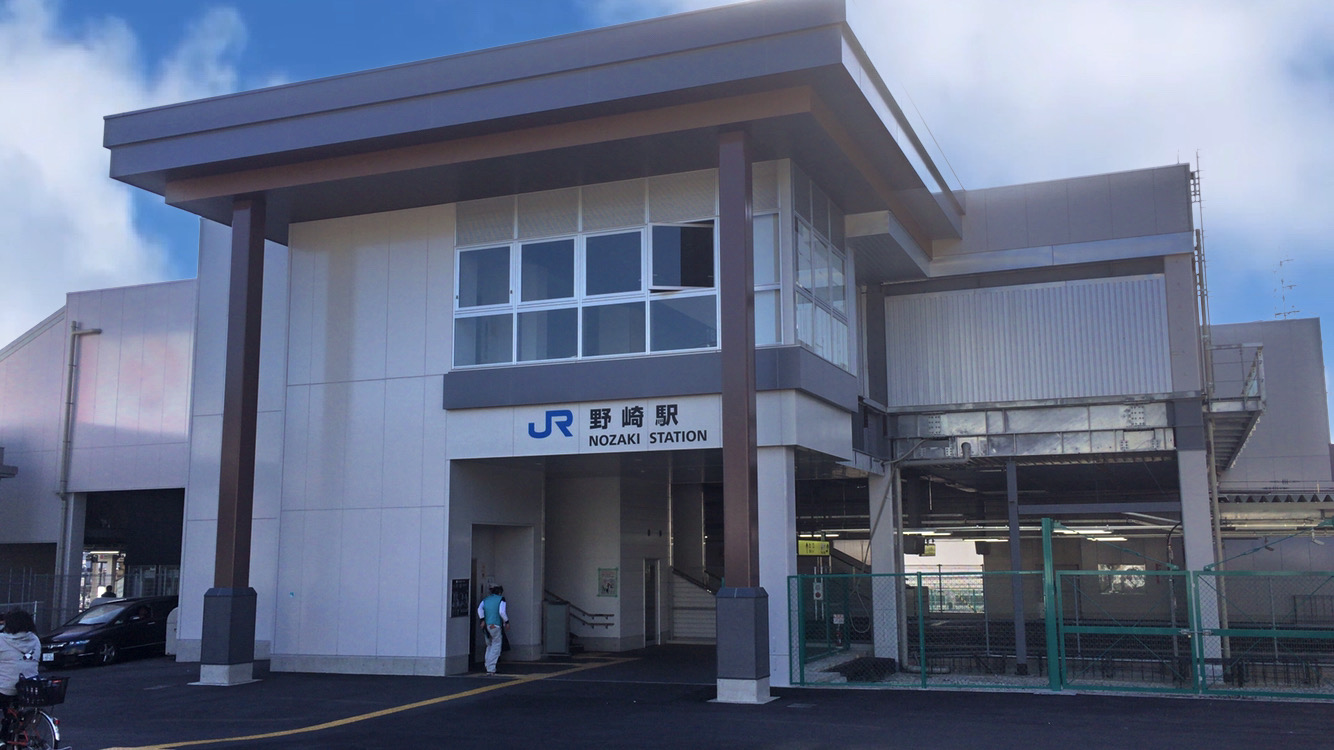
- Nozaki Station, April 2021

General information
- Location: 1--1 Nozaki, Daitō-shi, Osaka-fu 574-0015; Japan
- Coordinates: 34°43′07″N 135°38′14″E
- Operator: JR West
- Line: H Katamachi Line
- Distance: 33.3 km from Kizu
- Platforms: 2 side platforms
- Tracks: 2
- Connections: Bus stop

Construction
- Structure type: Ground level

Other information
- Status: Staffed
- Station code: JR-H35
- Website: Official website

History
- Opened: 15 May 1899

Passengers
- FY2019: 11,074 daily
Location
- Location within Osaka Prefecture Location within Japan

Nozaki Station (野崎駅, Nozaki-eki) is a passenger railway station in located in the city of Daitō, Osaka Prefecture, Japan, operated by West Japan Railway Company (JR West).

== Lines ==
Nozaki Station is served by the Katamachi Line (Gakkentoshi Line), and is located 33.3 kilometres (20.7 miles) from the starting point of the line at Kizu Station.

== Station layout ==
The station has two opposed ground-level side platforms with an elevated station. The station is staffed.

== Platforms ==
1	■ H KatamachiLine	for Kyōbashi, Kitashinchi and Amagasaki
2	■ H Katamachi Line	for Shijōnawate and Matsuiyamate

== Adjacent stations ==
«	Service	»
Katamachi Line (Gakkentoshi Line)
Rapid Service: Does not stop at this station
Regional Rapid Service: Does not stop at this station
Shijōnawate	Local	Suminodō

== History ==
The station was opened on 15 May 1899.

Station numbering was introduced in March 2018 with Nozaki being assigned station number JR-H35.

== Passenger statistics ==
In fiscal 2019, the station was used by an average of 11,074 passengers daily (boarding passengers only).

== Surrounding area ==
- Nozaki Kannon (Jigen-ji)
- Iimoriyama Castle
- Osaka Sangyo University
- Osaka Sangyo University Junior College
- Osaka Toin Junior and Senior High School
- Osaka Prefectural Nozaki High School
