= JR Miyamaki Station =

Railway station in Kyōtanabe, Kyoto Prefecture, Japan

Coordinates: 34°47′53.91″N 135°47′4.36″E

JR Miyamaki Station JR三山木駅
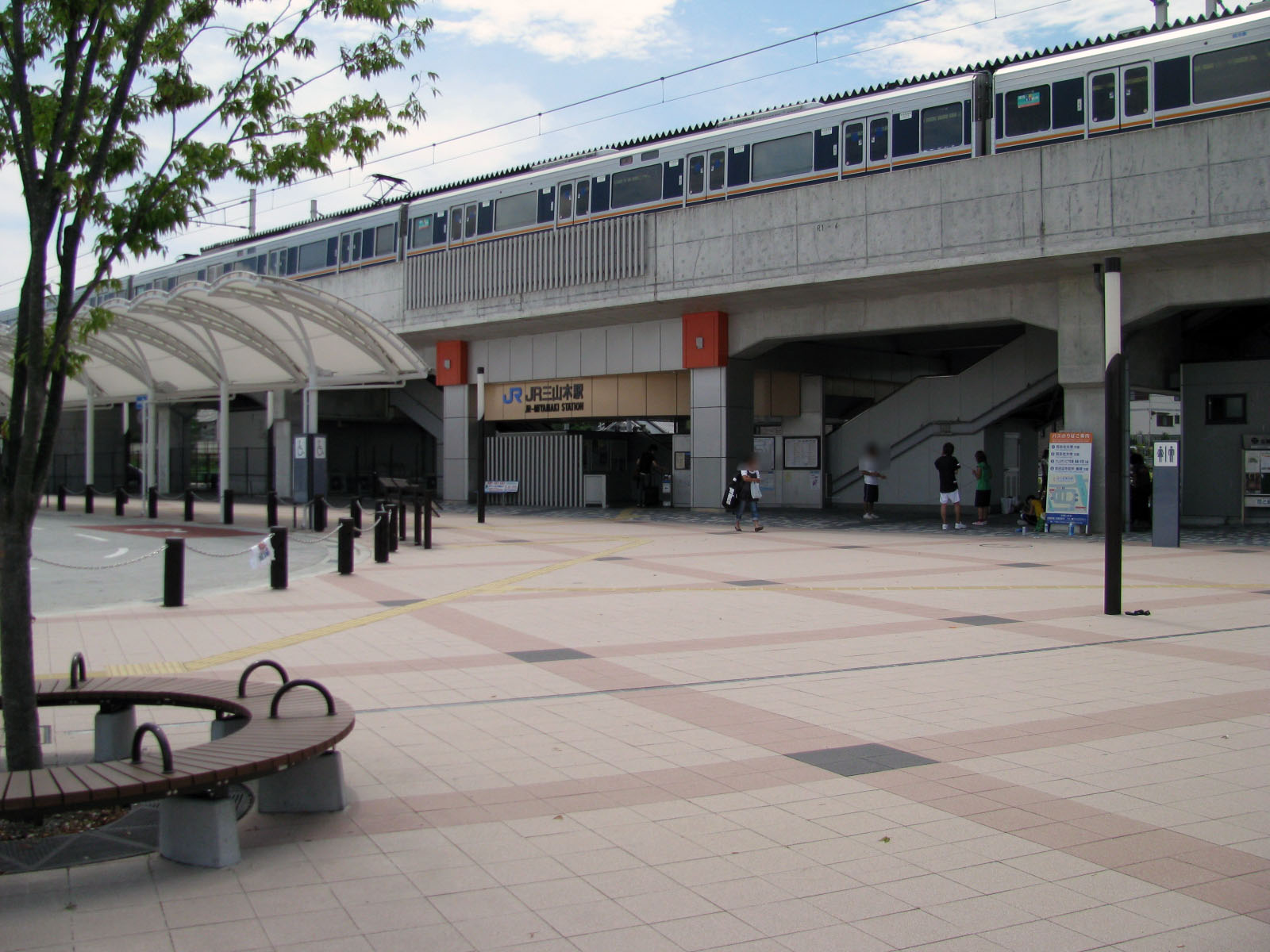
- JR Miyamaki Station, August 2008

General information
- Location: 4, Miyamaki-Takatobi, Kyōtanabe-shi, Kyoto-fu 610-0313; Japan
- Operator: JR West
- Line: H Katamachi Line
- Distance: 9.4 km (5.8 miles) from Kizu
- Platforms: 1 island platform
- Tracks: 2
- Connections: Bus terminal

Construction
- Structure type: Elevated

Other information
- Station code: JR-H22
- Website: Official website

History
- Opened: 1 December 1952
- Former names: Kamitanabe (to 1997)

Passengers
- FY 2023: 1,924 daily

Services
Preceding station	JR West	Following station
Dōshishamae towards Kyōbashi	Gakkentoshi Line Rapid Service Regional Rapid Service Local	Shimokoma towards Kizu
Location
- Location within Kyoto Prefecture Location within Japan

JR Miyamaki Station (JR三山木駅, JR Miyamaki-eki) is a passenger railway station located in the city of Kyōtanabe, Kyoto, Japan, operated by the West Japan Railway Company (JR West). There is a transfer at this station to the nearby Miyamaki Station on the Kintetsu Kyoto Line.

== Lines ==
JR Miyamaki Station is served by the Katamachi Line (Gakkentoshi Line), and is located at 9.4 km (5.8 miles) from the terminus of the line at Kizu.

== Layout ==
The station has one elevated island platform with the station located underneath. The station is unattended.

=== Platforms ===
1	■ H Katamachi Line (Gakkentoshi Line)	for Shijonawate and Kyobashi
2	■ H Katamachi Line (Gakkentoshi Line)	for Kizu

== History ==
JR Miyamaki Station opened on 1 December 1952 as Kamitanabe Station (上田辺駅). With the privatization of Japanese National Railways (JNR) on 1 April 1987, the station came under the control of JR West. It was renamed to its present name on 8 March 1997. Station numbering was introduced in March 2018 with JR Miyamaki being assigned station number JR-H22.

== Passenger statistics ==
In fiscal 2019, the station was used by an average of 1068 passengers daily.

== Surrounding area ==
- Doshisha University Kyotanabe Campus
- Doshisha Women's University Kyotanabe Campus
- Doshisha International Junior and Senior High School
- Kintetsu Kyoto Line Miyamagi Station
- Kyotanabe City Miyamaki Elementary School

== See also ==
- List of railway stations in Japan
