= Kōdo Station (Kyoto) =

Railway station in Kyōtanabe, Kyoto Prefecture, Japan

Kōdo Station 興戸駅
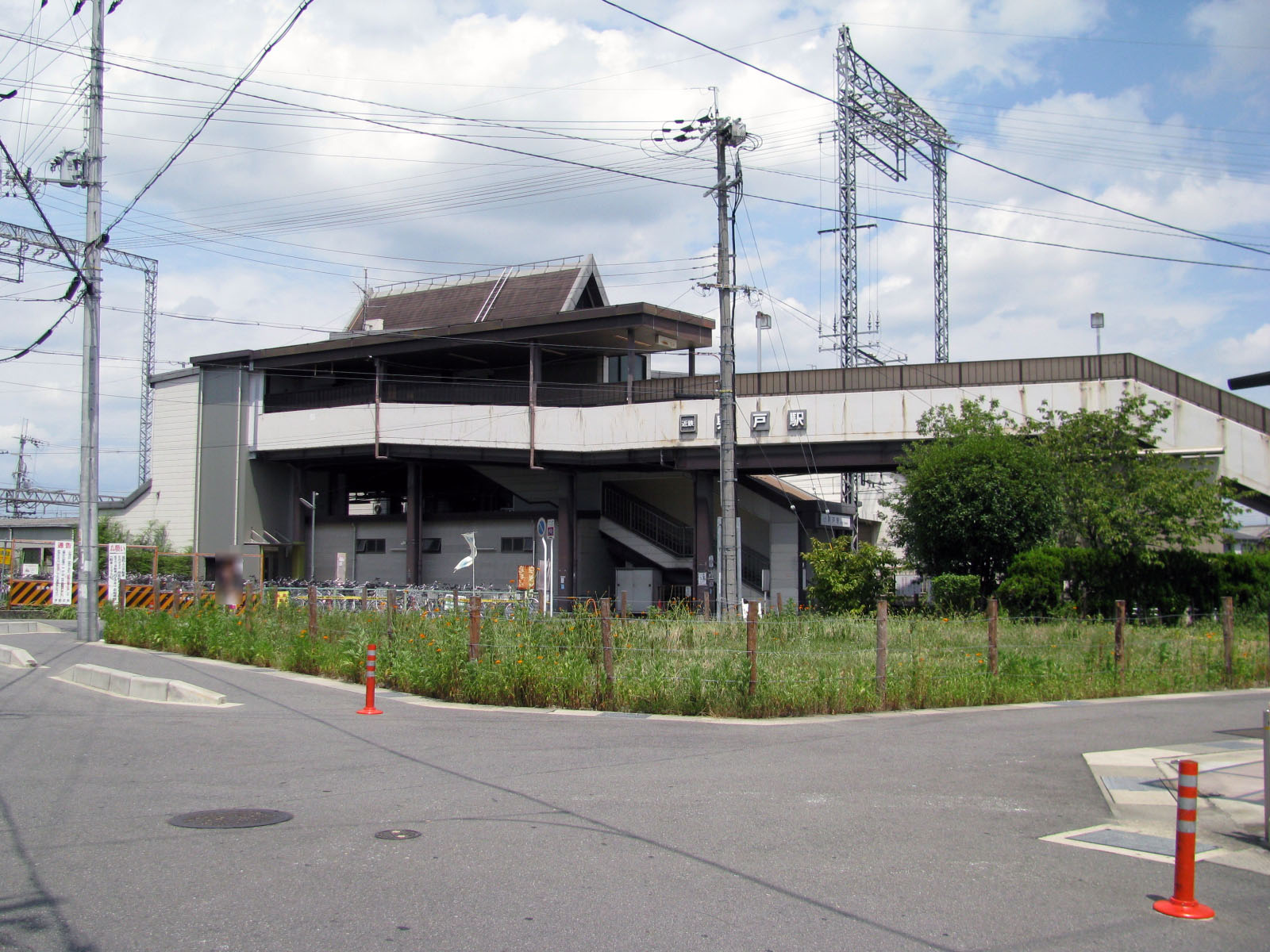
- Kōdo Station, August 2008

General information
- Location: Kodokitaochinobe, Kyōtanabe-shi, Kyoto-fu 610-0332; Japan
- Coordinates: 34°48′29.51″N 135°46′43.41″E
- System: Kintetsu Railway commuter rail station
- Owner: Kintetsu Railway
- Operator: Kintetsu Railway
- Line: Kyoto/Kashihara Line
- Distance: 21.1 km from Kyoto
- Platforms: 2 side platforms
- Connections: Bus terminal

Other information
- Station code: B17
- Website: Official website

History
- Opened: 5 July 1954

Passengers
- FY2019: 10,678 daily

Services
Preceding station	Kintetsu Railway	Following station
Shin-Tanabe towards Kyōto	Kyoto Line Local	Miyamaki towards Yamato-Saidaiji
Location
- Location within Kyoto Prefecture Location within Japan

Kōdo Station (興戸駅, Kōdo-eki) is a passenger railway station located in the city of Kyōtanabe, Kyoto, Japan, operated by the private transportation company, Kintetsu Railway. It is one of the nearby stations of Kyotanabe Campus of Doshisha University. Its station number is B17.

== Lines ==
Kōdo Station is served by the Kyoto Line, and is located 21.1 rail kilometers from the terminus of the line at Kyoto Station.

== Station layout ==
The station consists of two opposed side platforms with an effective platform length of six cars, connected by an elevated station building.

=== Platforms ===
1	■ Kintetsu Kyoto Line	For Tenri, and Kashiharajingu-mae
2	■ Kintetsu Kyoto Line	For Kyoto

== History ==
Kōdo Station opened on 5 July 1954 as a station on the Nara Electric Railway. The Nara Electric Railway was merged into the Kintetsu group in 1963. The tracks were elevated and the station completed in 2005.

== Passenger statistics ==
In fiscal 2018, the station was used by an average of 10,678 passengers daily.

== Surrounding area ==
- Doshishamae Station - West Japan Railway Katamachi Line (Gakkentoshi Line)
- Doshisha University
- Doshisha Women's University

== See also ==
- List of railway stations in Japan
