= Shijōnawate =

Shijōnawate 四條畷市
- City
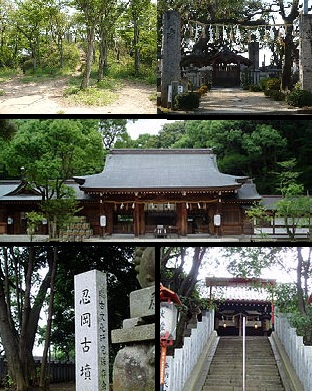

- Flag Seal

- Location of Shijōnawate in Osaka Prefecture

- Location in Japan
- Coordinates: 34°44′24″N 135°38′22″E
- Country: Japan
- Region: Kansai
- Prefecture: Osaka

Government
  - Mayor: Sho Zeniya (銭谷翔)

Area
  - Total: 18.69 km^{2} (7.22 sq mi)

Population (January 31, 2022)
  - Total: 54,969
  - Density: 2,941/km^{2} (7,617/sq mi)
- Time zone: UTC+09:00 (JST)
- City hall address: 1-1 Nakanohommachi, Shijōnawate-shi, Ōsaka-fu 575-8501
- Website: Official website
- Symbols
- Flower: Azalea
- Tree: Camphor laurel

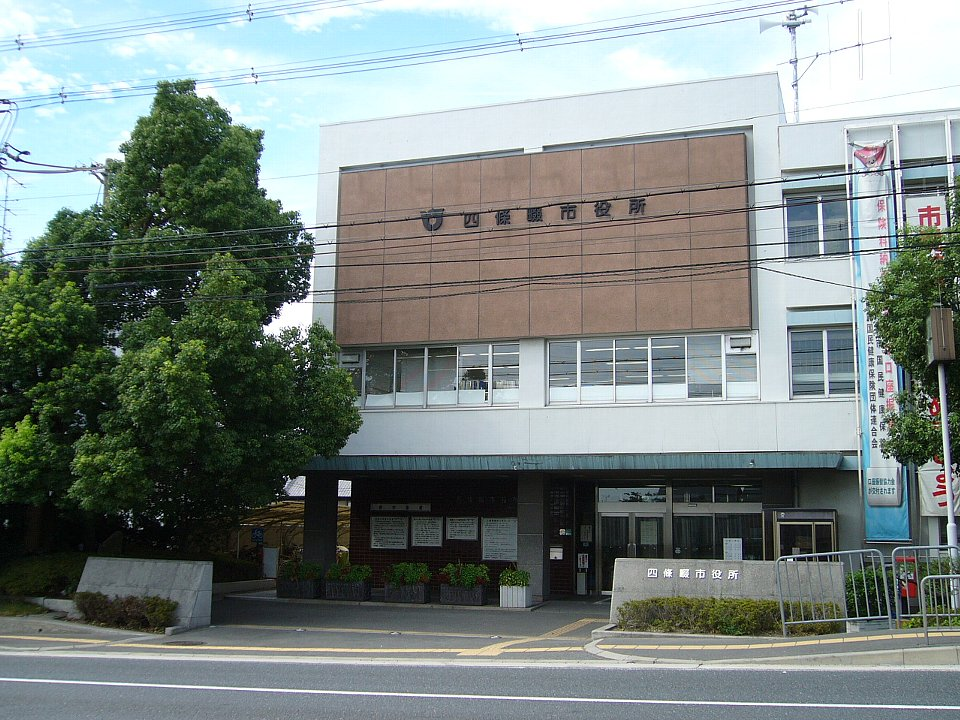
Shijōnawate City Hall

Shijōnawate (四條畷市, Shijōnawate-shi) is a city located in Osaka Prefecture, Japan. As of 31 January 2022, the city had an estimated population of 54,969 in 246822 households and a population density of 2900 persons per km^{2}. The total area of the city is 18.69 square kilometres (7.22 sq mi).

== Geography ==
Shijōnawate is located in the east-central part of Osaka Prefecture, about 15 km from the city center of Osaka. Two-thirds of the city area is the northern Ikoma Mountains. The city ranges in elevation from 3 meters to 361 meters above sea level.

=== Neighboring municipalities ===
Nara Prefecture

- Ikoma

Osaka Prefecture

- Daitō
- Katano
- Neyagawa

== Climate ==
Shijōnawate has a humid subtropical climate (Köppen Cfa) characterized by warm summers and cool winters with light to no snowfall. The average annual temperature in Shijōnawate is 15.1 °C. The average annual rainfall is 1356 mm with September as the wettest month. The temperatures are highest on average in August, at around 27.2 °C, and lowest in January, at around 3.6 °C.

== Demographics ==
Per Japanese census data, the population of Shijōnawate rose very rapidly in the 1960s and 1970s, and has since leveled off.

Historical population
| Year | Pop. | ±% |
|---|---|---|
| 1920 | 5,200 | — |
| 1930 | 5,732 | +10.2% |
| 1940 | 7,243 | +26.4% |
| 1950 | 9,806 | +35.4% |
| 1960 | 10,778 | +9.9% |
| 1970 | 37,893 | +251.6% |
| 1980 | 50,582 | +33.5% |
| 1990 | 50,035 | −1.1% |
| 2000 | 55,136 | +10.2% |
| 2010 | 57,561 | +4.4% |

== History ==
The area of the modern city of Shijōnawate was within ancient Kawachi Province, and was the site of the 1348 Battle of Shijōnawate. The village of Shijōnawate (written as 甲可村), was established within Sasara District with the creation of the modern municipalities system on April 1, 1889. On April 1, 1896, the area became part of Kitakawachi District, Osaka. On April 1, 1932, the village adopted the present kanji for its name and on July 1, 1947 it was raised to town status. The neighboring village of Tahara was absorbed on June 25, 1961. On July 1, 1970, Shijōnawate was raised to city status.

== Government ==
Shijōnawate has a mayor-council form of government with a directly elected mayor and a unicameral city council of 12 members. Shijōnawate, together with Daitō, contributes two members to the Osaka Prefectural Assembly. In terms of national politics, the city is part of Osaka 12th district of the lower house of the Diet of Japan.

== Economy ==
Shijōnawate has a mixed economy with light manufacturing and agriculture. Due to its proximity to the Osaka metropolis, it has increasing become a commuter town.

== Education ==
Shijōnawate has seven public elementary schools and four public middle schools operated by the city government and one public high school operated by the Osaka Prefectural Department of Education. The prefecture also operates one special education school for the handicapped.

== Transportation ==
=== Railways ===
- JR West – Katamachi Line (Gakkentoshi Line)
- Shinobugaoka

(Shijonawate Station is in neighboring Daitō)

=== Highways ===
- National Route 163
- National Route 170

== Sister cities ==
- Kihoku, Mie Japan, friendship city agreement since 1995 (with former Kiinagashima town)
- Meerbusch, North Rhine-Westphalia, Germany, since December 2010

== Local attractions ==
- Shijōnawate Shrine
- Iimoriyama Castle - National Historic Site and one of the Continued Top 100 Japanese Castles.
- Grave of Kusunoki Masashige

== Notable people from Shijōnawate ==
- Nobutaka Imamura, Japanese professional baseball player
- Yūgo Ishikawa, Japanese manga artist
- Fuminori Ujihara, Japanese comedian (Rozan)
- Tomomitsu Yamaguchi, Japanese comedian, actor, voice actor, singer and presenter
- Hiroshi Yamashita, Japanese rugby union player
