= Nishi-Kizu Station =

Railway station in Kizugawa, Kyoto Prefecture, Japan

Nishi-Kizu Station 西木津駅
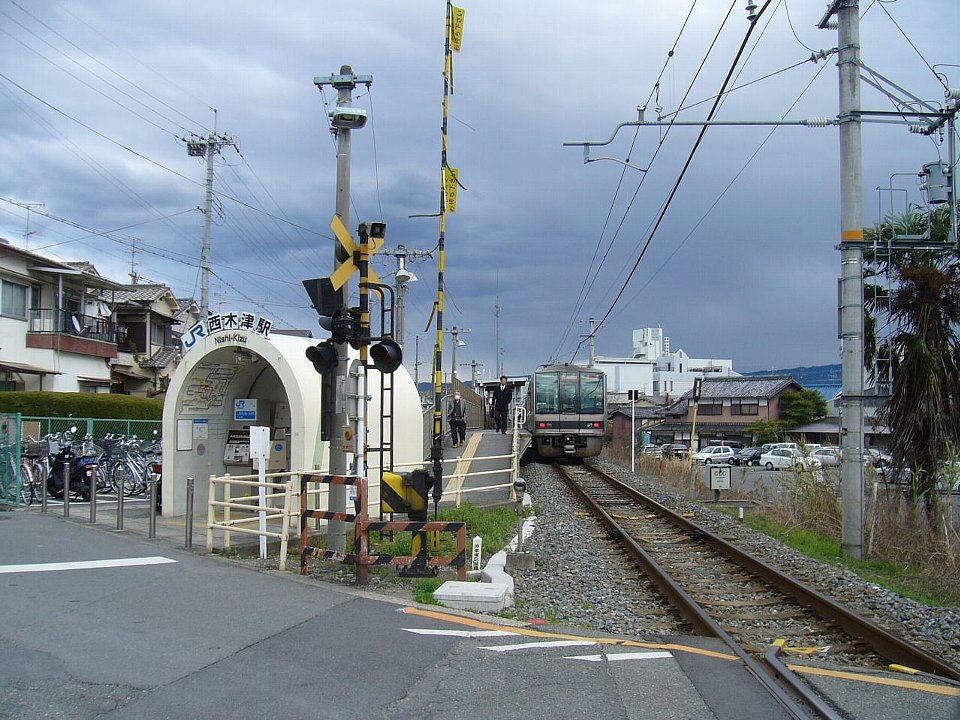
- Nishi-Kizu Station, March 2007

General information
- Location: Kawanoshiri Saganaka, Kizugawa-shi, Kyoto-fu 619-0222; Japan
- Coordinates: 34°44′15.98″N 135°48′12.67″E
- Operator: JR West
- Line: H Katamachi Line
- Distance: 2.2 km (1.4 miles) from Kizu
- Platforms: 1 side platform
- Tracks: 1
- Connections: Bus terminal

Construction
- Structure type: at grade

Other information
- Station code: JR-H19
- Website: Official website

History
- Opened: 1 December 1952

Passengers
- FY 2023: 806 daily
Location
- Location within Kyoto Prefecture Location within Japan

Nishi-Kizu Station (西木津駅, Nishi-Kizu-eki) is a passenger railway station located in the city of Kizugawa, Kyoto, Japan, operated by the West Japan Railway Company (JR West).

== Lines ==
Nishi-Kizu Station is served by the Katamachi Line (Gakkentoshi Line), and is located at 2.2 km (1.4 miles) from the terminus of the line at Kizu.

== Layout ==
The station has one side platform serving bi-directional traffic. The length of the platform was for 4 cars, but due to the timetable revision on March 13, 2010, the platform was extended to operate with 7-car trains. The station is unattended.

== Adjacent Stations ==
«	Service	»
Katamachi Line (Gakkentoshi Line)
Kizu	Rapid Service	Hōsono
Kizu	Regional Rapid Service	Hōsono
Kizu	Local	Hōsono

== History ==
Nishi-Kizu Station opened on 1 December 1952. With the privatization of Japanese National Railways (JNR) on 1 April 1987, the station came under the control of JR West. It was renamed to its present name on 8 March 1997. Station numbering was introduced in March 2018 with Nishi-Kizu being assigned station number JR-H19.

== Passenger statistics ==
In fiscal 2019, the station was used by an average of 459 passengers daily.

== Surrounding area ==
- Kizugawa City Kizu Junior High School
- Kizugawa City Sagara Elementary School
- Japan National Route 163

== See also ==
- List of railway stations in Japan
