= Dōshishamae Station =

Railway station in Kyōtanabe, Kyoto Prefecture, Japan

Coordinates: 34°48′18.45″N 135°46′43.08″E

Dōshishamae Station 同志社前駅
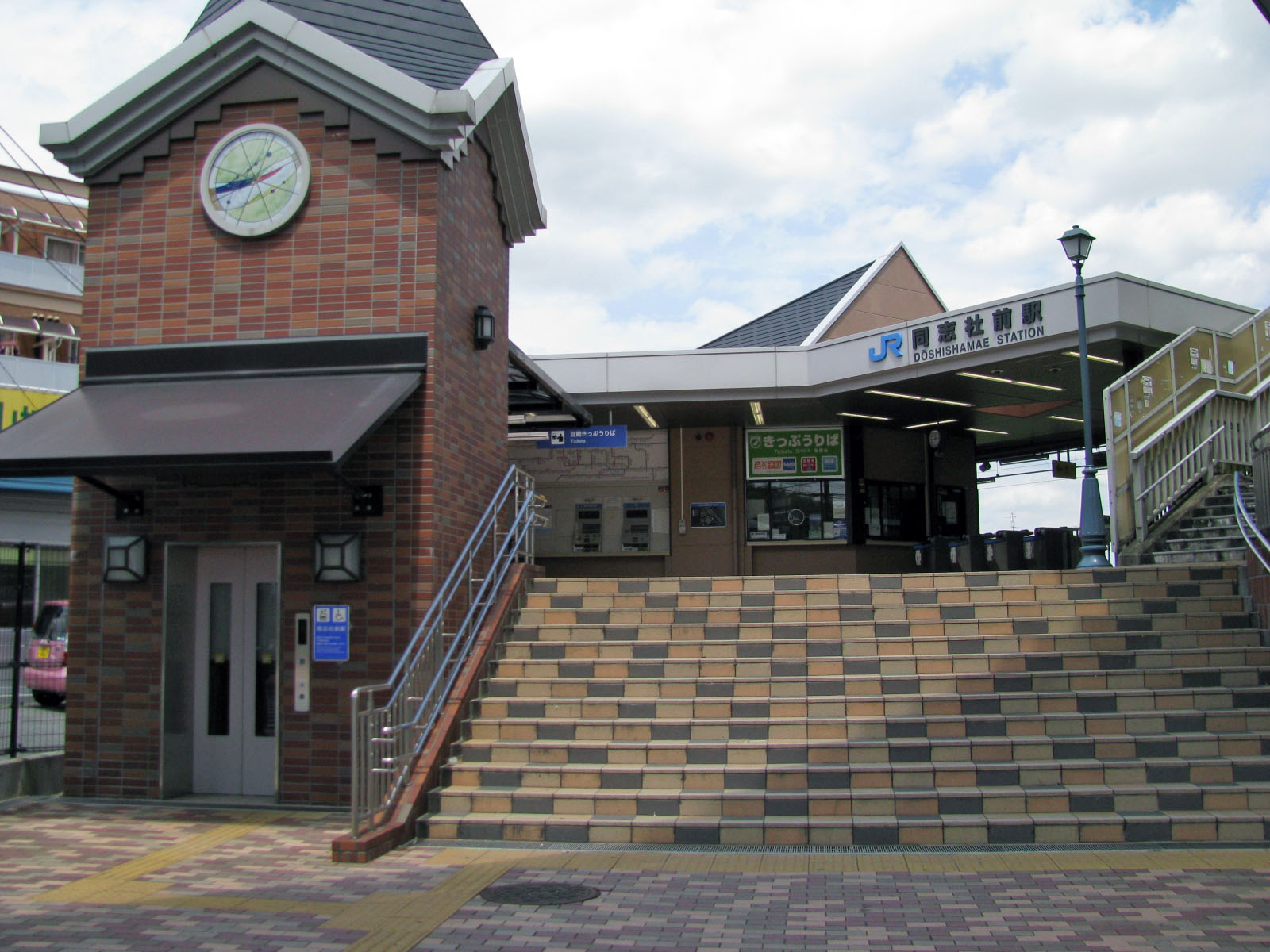
- Dōshishamae Station, August 2008

General information
- Location: 61 Miyamaki-Kakinouchi, Kyōtanabe-shi, Kyoto-fu 610-0313; Japan
- Operator: JR West
- Line: H Katamachi Line
- Distance: 10.5 km (6.5 miles) from Kizu
- Platforms: 1 side platform
- Tracks: 1
- Connections: Bus terminal

Construction
- Structure type: At grade

Other information
- Station code: JR-H23
- Website: Official website

History
- Opened: 1 April 1986

Passengers
- FY 2023: 9,054 daily
Location
- Location within Kyoto Prefecture Location within Japan

Dōshishamae Station (同志社前駅, Dōshishamae-eki) is a passenger railway station located in the city of Kyōtanabe, Kyoto, Japan, operated by the West Japan Railway Company (JR West). It is located near the entrance to the Kyōtanabe campuses of Doshisha University, Doshisha Women's College of Liberal Arts, and Doshisha International Junior Senior High School, hence the name of the station, which literally means "before" or "in front of" Doshisha.

== Lines ==
Dōshishamae Station is served by the Katamachi Line (Gakkentoshi Line), and is located at 10.5 km (6.5 miles) from the terminus of the line at Kizu.

== Layout ==
The station has one side platform serving bi-directional traffic. The station is staffed.

== Stations next to Dōshishamae ==
«	Service	»
Katamachi Line (Gakkentoshi Line)
JR Miyamaki	Rapid Service	Kyōtanabe
JR Miyamaki	Regional Rapid Service	Kyotanabe
JR Miyamaki	Local	Kyotanabe

== History ==
Dōshishamae Station opened on 1 April 1986. With the privatization of Japanese National Railways (JNR) on 1 April 1987, the station came under the control of JR West. It was renamed to its present name on 8 March 1997. Station numbering was introduced in March 2018 with Dōshishamae being assigned station number JR-H23.

== Passenger statistics ==
In fiscal 2019, the station was used by an average of 4637 passengers daily.

== Surrounding area ==
- Doshisha University Kyotanabe Campus
- Doshisha Women's University Kyotanabe Campus

== See also ==
- List of railway stations in Japan
