= Narayama Station =

Railway station in Nara, Nara Prefecture, Japan

Narayama Station 平城山駅
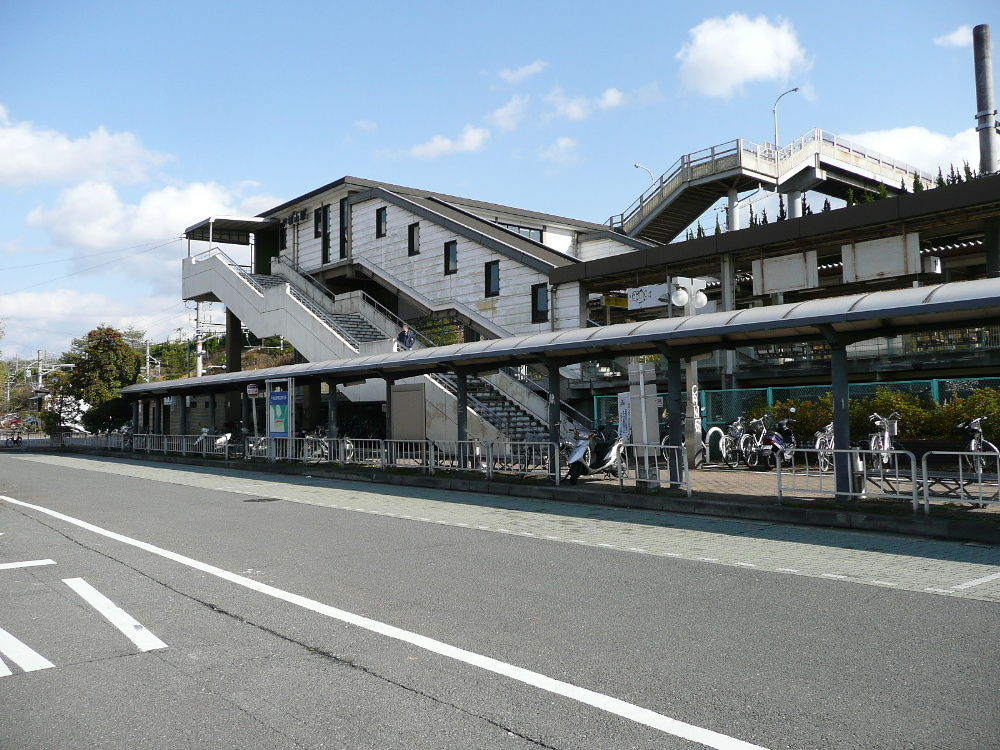
- Narayama Station west side in January 2008

General information
- Location: 1-840-1 Sahodai, Nara City; Nara Prefecture; Japan
- Coordinates: 34°42′39″N 135°48′38″E
- Owner: JR West
- Operator: JR West
- Lines: Passenger train services: D Nara Line; Q Yamatoji Line; Rail infrastructure: Kansai Main Line
- Distance: Nara Line: 37.9 km (23.5 miles) from Kyōto; Yamatoji Line: 9.2 km (5.7 miles) from Kamo
- Platforms: 2 side platforms
- Tracks: 2
- Bus stands: 2
- Connections: Nara Kotsu Bus Lines: 130 at Narayama-eki (East Exit) 30 and 32 at Narayama-eki (West Exit)

Construction
- Structure type: At grade
- Cycle facilities: Available
- Accessible: No

Other information
- Station code: D20; Q37
- Website: Official website

History
- Opened: 1 December 1985; 40 years ago

Passengers
- FY 2023: 2,440 daily
Services
Preceding station	JRW	Following station
D Nara Line
Nara; Terminus	Local	Kizu toward Kyōto
Nara; Terminus	Regional Rapid Service	Kizu toward Nishi-Akashi, Tsukaguchi, and Kyōto
Nara; Terminus	Rapid Service	Kizu toward Shin-Sanda and Takarazuka
Miyakoji Rapid Service: Does not stop at this station
Q Yamatoji Line
Nara toward JR Namba, Ōji, and Nara	Local	Kizu toward Kamo
Nara toward Ōsaka	Regional Rapid Service	Kizu toward Kamo
Nara toward JR Namba	Rapid Service	Kizu toward Kamo
Nara toward Ōsaka	Yamatoji Rapid Service	Kizu toward Kamo
Location
- Location within Nara Prefecture Location within Kansai region Location within Japan

Narayama Station (平城山駅, Narayama-eki) is a railway station of West Japan Railway Company (JR-West) in Nara, Nara Prefecture, Japan. Although the station is on the Kansai Main Line as rail infrastructure, it is served by both the Nara Line and the Yamatoji Line in terms of passenger train services. It has the station numbers "JR-Q37" (Yamatoji Line) and "JR-D20" (Nara Line).

== Layout ==
Narayama station has two side platforms with two tracks. A ticket machine is installed at the station. The IC card ticket "ICOCA" can be used at this station.

=== Platforms ===
1	■ Nara Line—Local	for Kyōto
1	■ Nara Line—Regional Rapid Service	for Nishi-Akashi, Tsukaguchi, and Kyōto
1	■ Nara Line—Rapid Service	for Shin-Sanda and Takarazuka
1	■ Yamatoji Line—Local	for Kamo
1	■ Yamatoji Line—Regional Rapid Service	for Kamo
1	■ Yamatoji Line—Rapid Service	for Kamo
1	■ Yamatoji Line—Yamatoji Rapid Service	for Kamo
2	■ Nara Line—Local	for Nara
2	■ Nara Line—Regional Rapid Service	for Nara
2	■ Nara Line—Rapid Service	for Nara
2	■ Yamatoji Line—Local	for JR Namba and Nara
2	■ Yamatoji Line—Regional Rapid Service	for Ōsaka
2	■ Yamatoji Line—Rapid Service	for JR Namba
2	■ Yamatoji Line—Yamatoji Rapid Service	for Ōsaka

== Passenger statistics ==
According to the "Statistical Yearbook of Nara Prefecture", the average number of people riding in recent years is as follows.

Year	Passengers
1997	1,187
1998	1,342
1999	1,430
2000	1,446
2001	1,432
2002	1,402
2003	1,411
2004	1,410
2005	1,448
2006	1,496
2007	1,554
2008	1,508
2009	1,416
2010	1,391
2011	1,367
2012	1,387
2013	1,423
2014	1,328
2015	1,338
2016	1,343

== See also ==
- List of railway stations in Japan
