= Miyamaki Station =

Railway station in Kyōtanabe, Kyoto Prefecture, Japan

Miyamaki Station 三山木駅
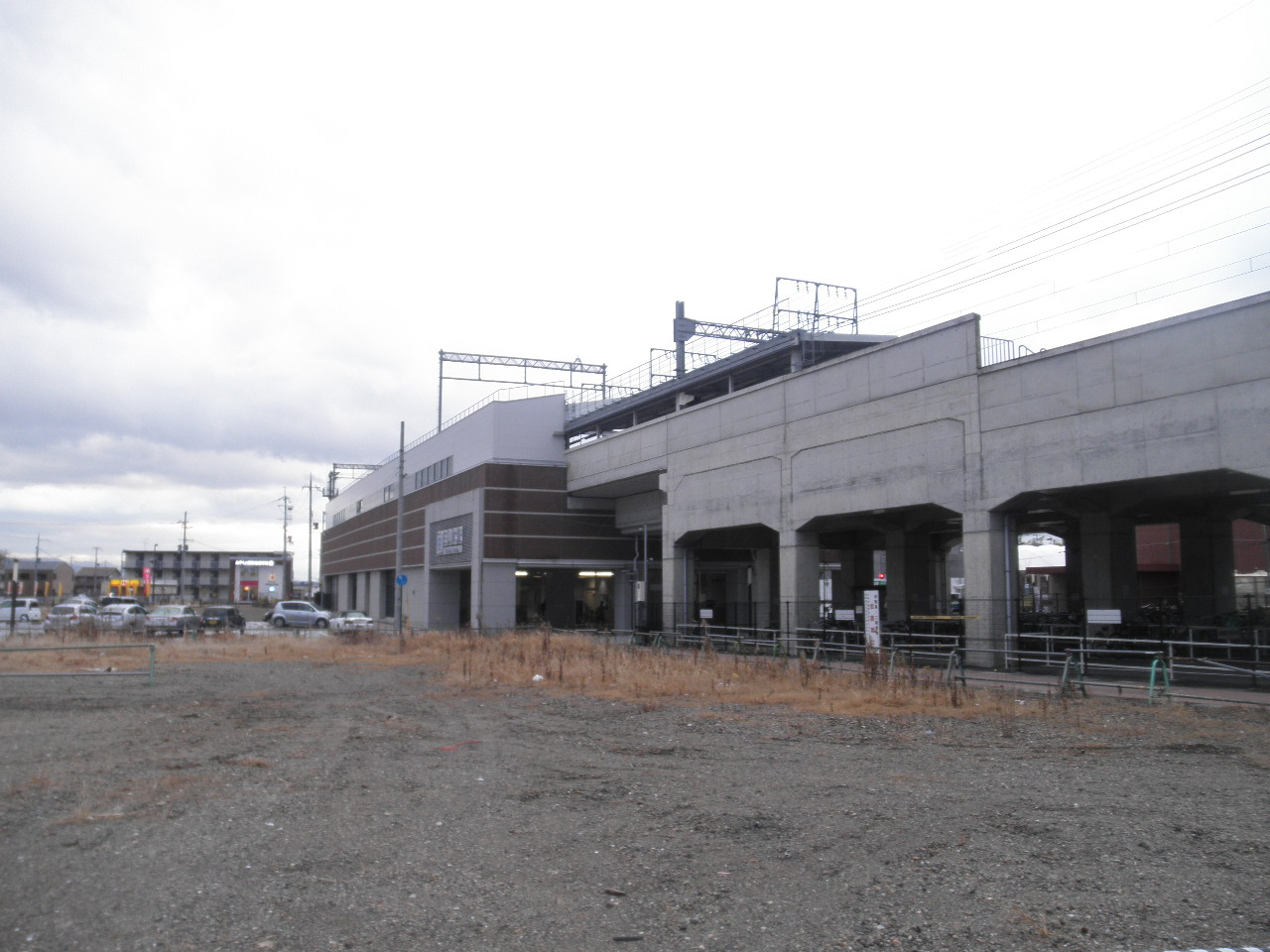
- Miyamaki Station, January 2012

General information
- Location: 1-chome Miyamakichuo, Kyōtanabe-shi, Kyoto-fu 610-0313; Japan
- Coordinates: 34°47′53.45″N 135°47′9.45″E
- System: Kintetsu Railway commuter rail station
- Owner: Kintetsu Railway
- Operator: Kintetsu Railway
- Line: Kyoto/Kashihara Line
- Distance: 22.4 km from Kyoto
- Platforms: 2 side platforms
- Connections: Bus terminal; JR Miyamaki Station(■Katamachi Line)

Other information
- Station code: B18
- Website: Official website

History
- Opened: 3 November 1928

Passengers
- FY2019: 6610 daily

Services
| Preceding station | Kintetsu Railway | Following station |
|---|---|---|
| Kōdo towards Kyōto | Kyoto Line Local Express (Kyoto bound for Miyazu) | Kintetsu-Miyazu towards Yamato-Saidaiji |
Location
- Location within Kyoto Prefecture Location within Japan

Miyamaki Station (三山木駅, Miyamaki-eki) is a passenger railway station located in the city of Kyōtanabe, Kyoto, Japan, operated by the private transportation company, Kintetsu Railway. It is station number B18.

== Lines ==
Miyamaki Station is served by the Kyoto Line, and is located 22.4 rail kilometers from the terminus of the line at Kyoto Station.

== Station layout ==
The station consists of two elevated opposed side platforms, with the station building underneath. The effective length of the platform is trains of six cars in length. There is only one ticket gate.

=== Platforms ===
| 1 | ■ Kintetsu Kyoto Line | For Yamato-Saidaiji, Nara, and Kashiharajingu-mae |
| 2 | ■ Kintetsu Kyoto Line | For Shin-Tanabe, Kintetsu-Tambabashi, and Kyoto |

== History ==
Miyamaki Station opened on 3 November 1928 as a station on the Nara Electric Railway. The Nara Electric Railway was merged into the Kintetsu group in 1963. The tracks were elevated and the new station building completed in 2005.

== Passenger statistics ==
In fiscal 2018, the station was used by an average of 6610 passengers daily.

== Surrounding area ==
- Kizu River
- Kyotanabe City Miyamaki Elementary School
- JR Miyamaki Station

== See also ==
- List of railway stations in Japan
