= Katamachi Line =

Railway line in Japan

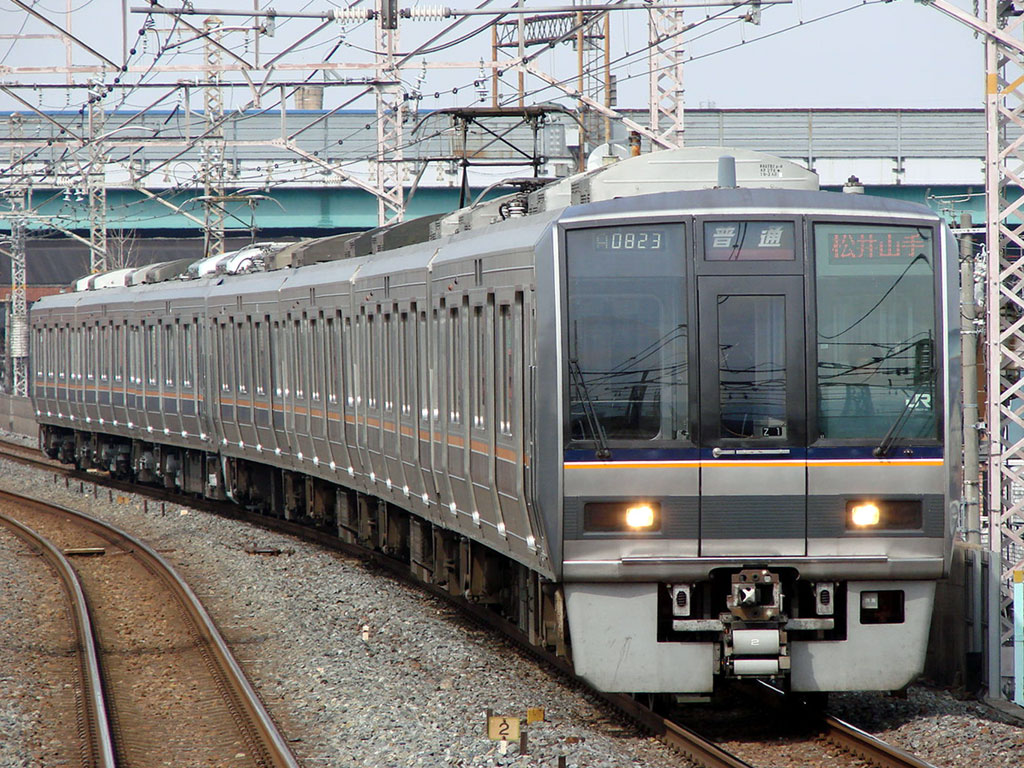
- 207 series EMU on a Local service

Overview
- Other name: Gakkentoshi Line
- Native name: 片町線
- Owner: JR West
- Locale: Osaka and Kyoto prefectures
- Termini: Kizu; Kyōbashi
- Stations: 24

Service
- Type: Heavy rail
- System: Urban Network
- Operator(s): JR West; JR Freight
- Rolling stock: 207 series 321 series

History
- Opened: 22 August 1895; 131 years ago

Technical
- Line length: 55.4 km (34.4 mi)
- Num of tracks: Double-track (Between Matsuiyamate and Kyōbashi); Single-track (between Matsuiyamate and Kizu)
- Track gauge: 1,067 mm (3 ft 6 in)
- Electrification: 1,500 V DC (overhead line)
- Operating speed: 110 km/h (68 mph)
- Train protection system: ATS-P and ATS-SW

The Katamachi Line (片町線, Katamachi-sen), officially nicknamed the Gakkentoshi Line (学研都市線, Gakkentoshi-sen), is a commuter rail line and service in the Osaka-Kobe-Kyoto Metropolitan Area of Japan, owned and operated by West Japan Railway Company (JR West). The line connects Kizu Station in Kyoto Prefecture and Kyōbashi Station in Osaka.

The common name "Gakkentoshi Line", literally "Research City Line", comes from the Kansai Science City, which is located along the line around the border of Osaka and Nara prefectures.

== Basic data ==
- Operators, distances: 55.4 km (34.4 mi)
  - West Japan Railway Company (Category-1, Services and tracks)
  - Japan Freight Railway Company (Category-2, Services)
- Track:
  - Double-track line:
    - From Matsuiyamate to Kyōbashi
  - Single-track line:
    - From Kizu to Matsuiyamate
- Railway signalling:
  - From JR Miyamaki to Kyōbashi: Automatic
  - From Kizu to JR Miyamaki: Special Automatic (Track Circuit Detection)
- CTC centers:Ōsaka Operation Control Center
- CTC system:JR Takarazuka JR Tozai Gakkentoshisen traffic control system

== History ==
The line was originally built and operated by the Naniwa Railway (浪速鉄道, Naniwa Tetsudō) between Katamachi and Shijōnawate in 1895. Two years later, the Kansai Railway bought the line in order to have its own trunk line to Osaka from Nagoya, combined with constructing the section between Shijōnawate and Kizu. Katamachi Station was unable to be expanded, thus Amijima terminus was constructed. However Kansai Railway bought the Osaka Railway line from Nara via Ōji to Minatomachi (present JR Namba) in downtown Osaka, and shifted its main line to the ex-Naniwa Railway line. Thereafter, the Katamachi Line became a branch of the railway network of Osaka.

The Shigino to Hanaten section was duplicated in 1927, with the Katamachi to Shigino section double-tracked in 1955, the Hanaten to Shijonawate section in 1969, extended to Nagao in 1979, to Matsuiyamate in 1989, and the balance of the section to Kyobashi double-tracked between 2007 and 2009.

The section between Katamachi and Shijōnawate became the first Japan Governmental Railways electrified line in Osaka-Kobe-Kyoto area in 1932, with electrification extended to Nagao in 1950. After privatization of the then Japanese National Railways (JNR), the line became part of the West Japan Railway Company (JR West) system, and the Kizu to Nagao section was electrified in 1989.

In 1997, the JR Tōzai Line was opened and connected to Katamachi Line at Kyōbashi, and Katamachi Station was closed (with Ōsakajō-kitazume Station becoming the replacement station). Most trains began operating through to the Fukuchiyama Line (JR Takarazuka Line).

Converted from a freight branch to a passenger route, the Osaka Higashi Line began service in 2008. Trains from Nara via Kansai Main (Yamatoji) Line began operation to Amagasaki Station. However, these through trains to Amagasaki have now ceased operation since March 2019, with the Osaka Higashi Line extension.

Station numbering was introduced to the line in March 2018 with stops being assigned station numbers between JR-H18 and JR-H41.

=== Military use ===
Three military/weapons-related facilities used during the early 20th century were serviced by spurs located between Fujisaka and Tsuda Stations (Kin-ya Ammunition Dump, where two explosions occurred in 1909 and 1939), between Kawachi-Iwafune and Hoshida Stations (Uji Weapon Kori Factory), and the Osaka Army Arsenal warehouse between Hanaten and Shigino Stations.

== Route and operation ==
The line is connected via the JR Tōzai Line in downtown Osaka, at Amagasaki, to the Tōkaidō Main Line (JR Kobe Line) and Fukuchiyama Line (JR Takarazuka Line). This link enables trains operated from Nara to the west, as Kobe, Himeji, and Sanda.

Rapid services of several types of stops, with no surcharge, are also provided. Abbreviations are tentative for this article.

Some trains terminate at Matsuiyamate due to the single track to Kizu.

Local (普通, Futsū)
Operated all day, most trains between Matsuiyamate and Nishi-Akashi on Sanyō Main (JR Kobe) Line. Some in busy hours to Fukuchiyama Line (JR Takarazuka Line), some terminate at Kyōbashi.
Regional Rapid (区間快速, Kukan Kaisoku)
Operated in early morning, late night, and busy hours only. Some from/to Nara, most from/to Dōshishamae or Kyōtanabe. Through to Nishiakashi or Shin-Sanda.
Rapid (快速, Kaisoku)
Mostly through to Shin-Sanda or Sasayamaguchi on Fukuchiyama (JR Takarazuka) Line. One per 15 minutes per direction.

=== Past services ===
Direct Rapid (直通快速, Chokutsū Kaisoku)
Through trains from Osaka Higashi Line, operated only between Hanaten and Kyōbashi in this line. Four trains to Amagasaki from Nara in the morning, 4 vice versa in the evening. This service has ceased operation on the Katamachi Line starting from 16 March 2019, with the opening of the Shin-Osaka Extension of the Osaka Higashi Line.

== Stations ==
No.	Station		Stops		Transfers	Location	
No.	English	Japanese	Regional Rapid	Rapid	Transfers	District, City	Prefecture
Through service to/from Kansai Main Line (Yamatoji Line)
JR-H18	Kizu	木津	●	●	D Nara Line; Q Yamatoji Line (part of V Kansai Line)	Kizugawa	Kyoto
JR-H19	Nishi-Kizu	西木津	●	●		Kizugawa	Kyoto
JR-H20	Hōsono	祝園	●	●	B Kyoto Line (B21: Shin-Hōsono)	Seika, Sōraku	Kyoto
JR-H21	Shimokoma	下狛	●	●		Seika, Sōraku	Kyoto
JR-H22	JR Miyamaki	JR三山木	●	●		Kyōtanabe	Kyoto
JR-H23	Dōshisha-mae	同志社前	●	●		Kyōtanabe	Kyoto
JR-H24	Kyōtanabe	京田辺	●	●	B Kyoto Line (B16: Shin-Tanabe)	Kyōtanabe	Kyoto
JR-H25	Ōsumi	大住	●	●		Kyōtanabe	Kyoto
JR-H26	Matsuiyamate	松井山手	●	●		Kyōtanabe	Kyoto
JR-H27	Nagao	長尾	●	●		Hirakata	Osaka
JR-H28	Fujisaka	藤阪	●	｜		Hirakata	Osaka
JR-H29	Tsuda	津田	●	｜		Hirakata	Osaka
JR-H30	Kawachi-Iwafune	河内磐船	●	●	Keihan Katano Line (KH66: Kawachi-Mori Station)	Katano	Osaka
JR-H31	Hoshida	星田	●	●		Katano	Osaka
JR-H32	Neyagawa-Kōen	寝屋川公園	●	｜		Neyagawa	Osaka
JR-H33	Shinobugaoka	忍ケ丘	●	｜		Shijōnawate	Osaka
JR-H34	Shijōnawate	四条畷	●	●		Daitō	Osaka
JR-H35	Nozaki	野崎	｜	｜		Daitō	Osaka
JR-H36	Suminodō	住道	●	●		Daitō	Osaka
JR-H37	Kōnoikeshinden	鴻池新田	｜	｜	Osaka Monorail Main Line (proposed extension)	Higashiōsaka	Osaka
JR-H38	Tokuan	徳庵	｜	｜		Higashiōsaka	Osaka
JR-H39	Hanaten	放出	●	●	F Osaka Higashi Line	Tsurumi, Osaka	Osaka
JR-H40	Shigino	鴫野	｜	｜	F Osaka Higashi Line Imazatosuji Line (I19)	Jōtō, Osaka	Osaka
JR-H41	Kyōbashi	京橋	●	●	O Osaka Loop Line; Keihan Main Line (KH04); Nagahori Tsurumi-ryokuchi Line (N22)	Jōtō, Osaka	Osaka
Through service to/from JR Tōzai Line, further to/from Tōkaidō Main Line (JR Kobe Line) and Fukuchiyama Line (JR Takarazuka Line)

== Rolling stock ==
- 207 series (from 1991)
- 321 series (from 2005)

All trains are based at Aboshi Depot.

=== Former ===
- 40 series
- 51 series
- 72 series
- 101 series
- 103 series
- 223-6000 series (until March 2011)
- KiHa 10 series
- KiHa 20 series
- KiHa 35 series
- KiHa 40 series
- KiHa 45 series
- KiHa 58 series
- KiHa 41000
