= Matsuiyamate Station =

Railway station in Kyōtanabe, Kyoto Prefecture, Japan

Coordinates: 34°49′59.07″N 135°43′39.13″E

Matsuiyamate Station 松井山手駅
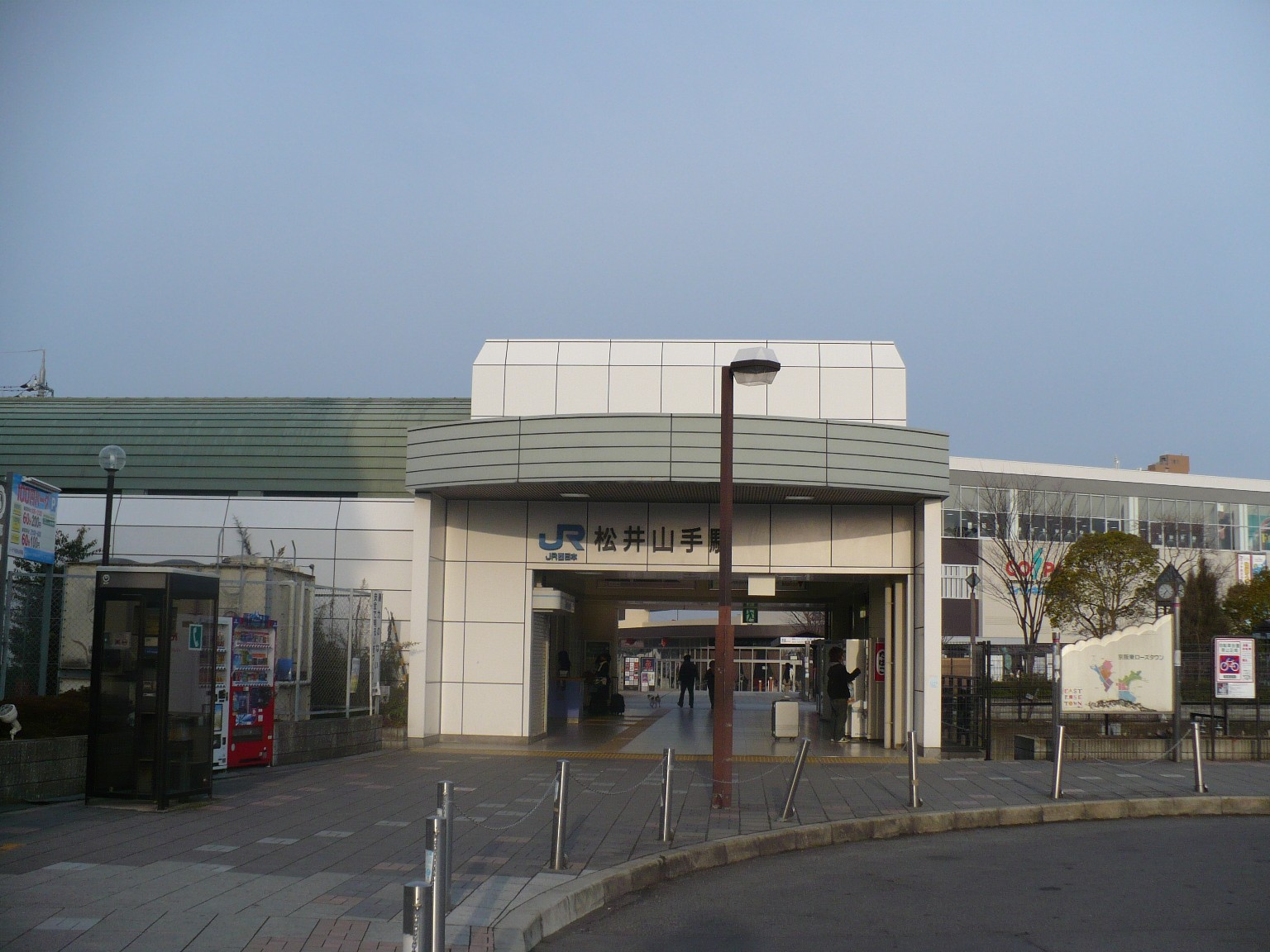
- Matsuiyamate Station, March 2008

General information
- Location: 70 Yamatechuo, Kyōtanabe-shi, Kyoto-fu 610-0356; Japan
- Operator: JR West
- Line: H Katamachi Line
- Distance: 17.0 km (10.6 miles) from Kizu
- Platforms: 2 side platforms
- Tracks: 2
- Connections: Bus terminal

Construction
- Structure type: Ground level

Other information
- Station code: JR-H26
- Website: Official website

History
- Opened: 11 March 1989

Passengers
- FY 2023: 13,330 daily

Services
Preceding station	JR West	Following station
Nagao towards Kyōbashi	Gakkentoshi Line Local Regional Rapid Service Rapid Service	Ōsumi towards Kizu
Planned services in the future
Preceding station	JR West	Following station
Shin-Ōsaka towards Tsuruga	Hokuriku Shinkansen	Kyōto towards Jōetsumyōkō
Location
- Location within Kyoto Prefecture Location within Japan

Matsuiyamate Station (松井山手駅, Matsuiyamate-eki) is a passenger railway station located in the city of Kyōtanabe, Kyoto, Japan, operated by the West Japan Railway Company (JR West).

== Lines ==
Matsuiyamate Station is served by the Katamachi Line (Gakkentoshi Line), and is located at 17.0 km (10.6 miles) from the terminus of the line at Kizu.

== Layout ==
The station has two opposed side platforms constructed in a cutting, connected by a station building at ground level. The station has a Midori no Madoguchi staffed ticket office.

=== Platforms ===
1	■ H Katamachi Line (Gakkentoshi Line)	for Kizu
2	■ H Katamachi Line (Gakkentoshi Line)	for Shijonawate and Kyobashi

== Stations next to Matsuiyamate ==
«	Service	»
Katamachi Line (Gakkentoshi Line)
Ōsumi	Rapid Service	Nagao
Ōsumi	Regional Rapid Service	Nagao
Ōsumi	Local	Nagao

== History ==
Matsuiyamate Station was opened on 11 March 1989.

Station numbering was introduced in March 2018 with Matsuiyamate being assigned station number JR-H26.

The station is on the planned route of the Hokuriku Shinkansen, with services from around 2046.

== Passenger statistics ==
In fiscal 2019, the station was used by an average of 7117 passengers daily.

== Surrounding area ==
- Kyotanabe City Matsugaoka Elementary School
- Kyotanabe Bus stop at the Kyotanabe Parking Area on Second Keihan Highway.

== See also ==
- List of railway stations in Japan
