= Shijōnawate Station =

Railway station in Daitō, Osaka Prefecture, Japan

Shijōnawate Station 四条畷駅
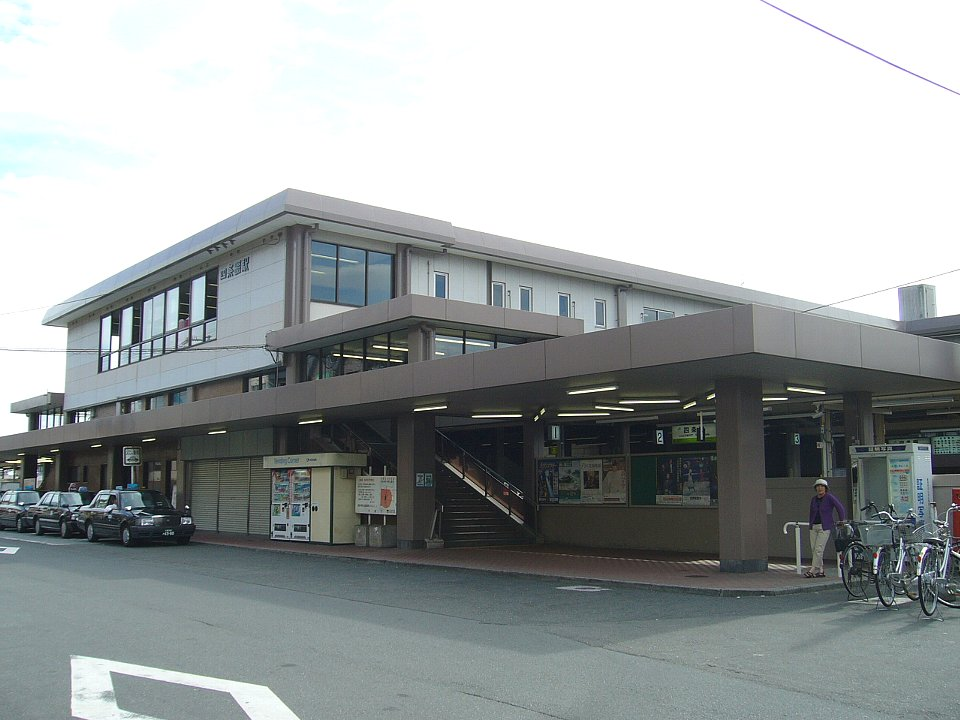
- Shijōnawate Station

General information
- Location: 1-50, Gakuen-machi,, Daitō-shi, Osaka-fu 574-0001; Japan
- Coordinates: 34°43′49.57″N 135°38′21.64″E
- Line: H Katamachi Line
- Distance: 39.8 km from Kizu
- Platforms: 2 island platforms
- Connections: Bus stop

Other information
- Status: Staffed (Midori no Madoguchi)
- Station code: JR-H34
- Website: Official website

History
- Opened: 22 August 1895

Passengers
- FY2019: 18,488 daily
Location
- Location within Osaka Prefecture Location within Japan

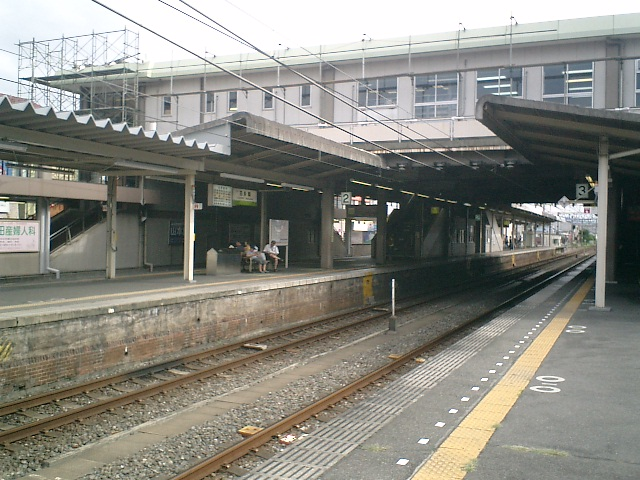
Platforms at Shijōnawate Station

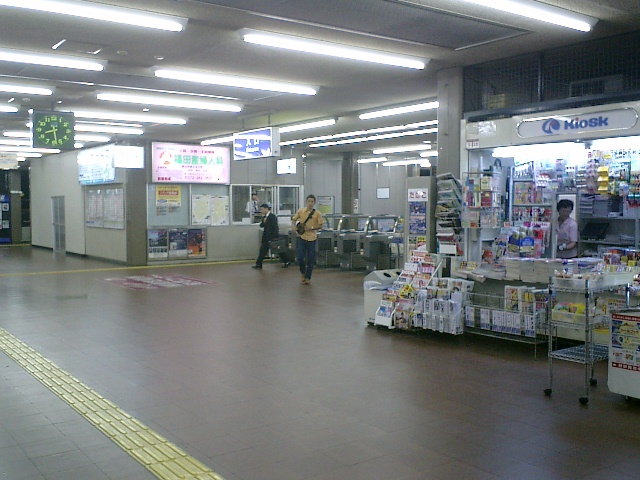
Concourse

Shijōnawate Station (四条畷駅, Shijōnawate-eki) is a passenger railway station in located in the city of Daitō, Osaka Prefecture, Japan, operated by West Japan Railway Company (JR West). Although the station is named "Shijōnawate", it is not located in that city, but just across the border in Daitō.

== Lines ==
Shijōnawate Station is served by the Katamachi Line (Gakkentoshi Line), and is located 39.8 kilometres (24.7 miles) from the starting point of the line at Kizu Station.

== Station layout ==
The station has two ground-level island platforms connected by an elevated station. The station has a Midori no Madoguchi staffed ticket office.

== Platforms ==
1, 2	■ H KatamachiLine	for Kyōbashi, Kitashinchi and Amagasaki
3, 4	■ H Katamachi Line	for Matsuiyamate

== Adjacent stations ==
«	Service	»
Katamachi Line (Gakkentoshi Line)
Hoshida	Rapid Service	Suminodō
Shinobugaoka	Regional Rapid Service	Suminodō
Shinobugaoka	Local	Nozaki

== History ==
The station was opened on 22 August 1895.

Station numbering was introduced in March 2018 with Shijōnawate being assigned station number JR-H34.

== Passenger statistics ==
In fiscal 2019, the station was used by an average of 18,488 passengers daily (boarding passengers only).

== Surrounding area ==
- Osaka Prefectural Shijonawate High School
- Shijonawate Gakuen Elementary School / Junior High School / High School
- Shijonawate Gakuen Junior College
