= Kizu Station (Kyoto) =

Railway station in Kizugawa, Kyoto Prefecture, Japan

Kizu Station 木津駅
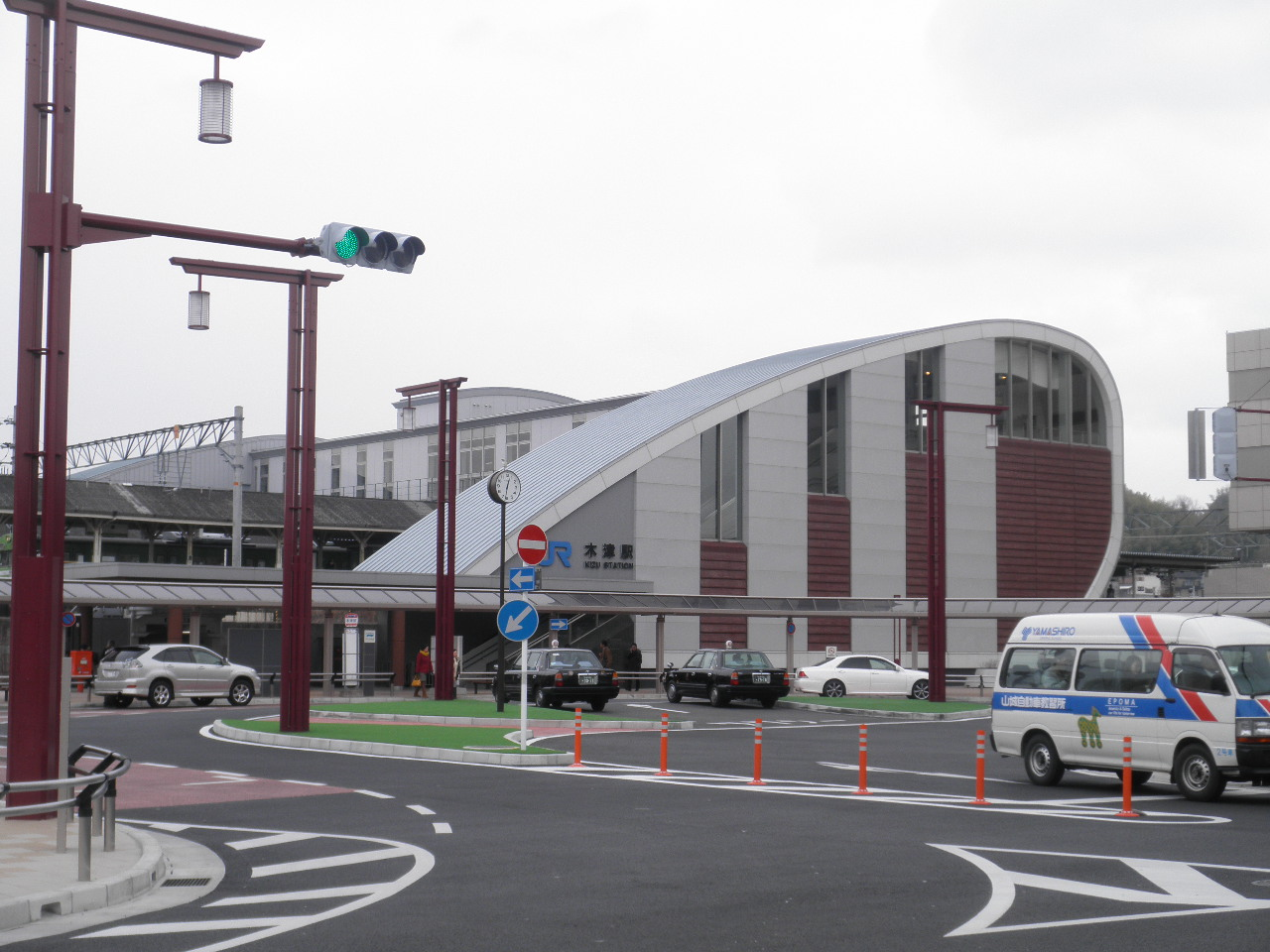
- Kizu Station in January 2012

General information
- Location: 116-2, Kizu-ikeda, Kizugawa-shi, Kyoto-fu 619-0214; Japan
- Coordinates: 34°44′09″N 135°49′30″E
- Owner: JR West
- Operator: JR West
- Lines: D Nara Line; H Gakkentoshi Line (Katamachi Line); Q Yamatoji Line
- Distance: Nara Line: 37.9 km (23.5 miles) from Kyōto; Gakkentoshi Line: 44.8 km (27.8 miles) from Kyōbashi; Yamatoji Line: 48.0 km (29.8 miles) from JR Namba
- Platforms: 2 island platforms
- Tracks: 4
- Bus stands: Bus terminal
- Connections: Nara Kotsu Bus Lines: 13, 14, and 33 at Kizu-eki (East Exit) 52, 71, and 72 at Kizu-eki (West Exit); Nara Kotsu Bus Lines: Kinotsu Bus: Ki-1, Ki-2, and Ki-3 at Kizu-eki (West Exit)

Construction
- Structure type: Elevated
- Cycle facilities: Available
- Accessible: Yes (1 elevator and 2 escalators for each exit, 1 elevator and 2 escalators for each platform, and 1 accessible bathroom inside the gate)

Other information
- Station code: JR-D19 (Nara Line); JR-H18 (Gakkentoshi Line); JR-Q38 (Yamatoji Line)
- Website: Official website

History
- Opened: 13 March 1896
- Rebuilt: 2007

Passengers
- FY 2023: 10,390 daily
Services
Preceding station	JRW	Following station
D Nara Line
Kamikoma toward Kyōto	Local	Narayama toward Nara
Kamikoma toward Kyōto	Regional Rapid Service	Narayama toward Nara
through to Gakkentoshi Line	Regional Rapid Service	Narayama toward Nara
Tamamizu toward Kyōto	Rapid Service	Nara; Terminus
through to Gakkentoshi Line	Rapid Service	Narayama toward Nara
Tamamizu toward Kyōto	Miyakoji Rapid Service	Nara; Terminus
H Gakkentoshi Line
Nishi-Kizu toward Kyōbashi	Local	Terminus
Nishi-Kizu toward Nishi-Akashi and Tsukaguchi	Regional Rapid Service	Terminus
Nishi-Kizu toward Nishi-Akashi and Tsukaguchi	Regional Rapid Service	through to Nara Line
Nishi-Kizu toward Shin-Sanda	Regional Rapid Service A	Terminus
Nishi-Kizu toward Sasayamaguchi, Shin-Sanda, Takarazuka, and Tsukaguchi	Rapid Service	Terminus
Nishi-Kizu toward Shin-Sanda and Takarazuka	Rapid Service	through to Nara Line
Q Yamatoji Line
Narayama toward JR Namba, Ōji, and Nara	Local	Kamo; Terminus
Narayama toward Ōsaka	Regional Rapid Service	Kamo; Terminus
Narayama toward JR Namba	Rapid Service	Kamo; Terminus
Narayama toward Ōsaka	Yamatoji Rapid Service	Kamo; Terminus
Location
- Location within Kyoto Prefecture Location within Japan

Kizu Station (木津駅, Kizu-eki) is a four-way junction station located in the city of Kizugawa, Kyoto, Japan. It is operated by the West Japan Railway Company (JR West). It has the station numbers "JR-Q38" (Yamatoji Line), "JR-D19" (Nara Line) and "JR-H18" (Gakkentoshi Line).

== Lines ==
Kizu Station is on the junction of three lines: the Nara Line, the Katamachi Line, and Kansai Main Line as of rail infrastructure, it is served by the Nara Line, the Gakkentoshi Line, and the Yamatoji Line in terms of passenger train services. It is the terminal station of the 44.8 kilometer Gakkentoshi Line to Kyōbashi and is 37.9 kilometers from Kyoto on the Nara Line and 126.9 kilometers from Nagoya in the Kansai Main Line.

== Layout ==
The station has two elevated island platforms connected by an elevated station building. The station has a Midori no Madoguchi staffed ticket office/

=== Platforms ===
1	■ H Katamachi Line (Gakkentoshi Line)	for Shijonawate and Kyobashi
2	■ Q Yamatoji Line	for Kamo and Iga-Ueno
	■ D Nara Line	for Uji and Kyoto
3	■ D Nara Line	for Nara
4	■ Q Yamatoji Line	for Nara, Tennōji and Osaka

== History ==
Kizu Station opened on 13 March 1896 as a station on the Nara Railway The Kansai Railway connected to the station in 1898. Both lines were nationalized in 1907. With the privatization of Japanese National Railways (JNR) on 1 April 1987, the station came under the control of JR West. It was renamed to its present name on 8 March 1997. Station numbering was introduced in March 2018 with Kizu being assigned station number JR-D19 for the Nara Line, JR-H18 for the Gakkentoshi Line, and JR-Q38 for the Yamatoji Line.

== Passenger statistics ==
According to the Kyoto Prefecture statistical report, the average number of passengers per day is as follows..

Year	Passengers
1999	3,197
2000	3,115
2001	3,090
2002	3,104
2003	3,082
2004	3,071
2005	3,096
2006	3,118
2007	3,211
2008	3,301
2009	3,241
2010	3,318
2011	3,342
2012	3,419
2013	3,556
2014	3,707
2015	4,123
2016	4,458
2017	5,674
2018	4,767
2019	4,981

== Surrounding area ==
- Kizugawa City Hall
- Yamashiro Public Hospital
- Kizu Central Library
- Kizugawa River
- Kizu Police Station (Kyoto Prefecture)
- National Route 24 ( National Route 163)
- Nara-Kyoto Prefectural Route 47
- Kyoto Prefectural Road 323
- Kyoto Prefectural Kizu High School

== See also ==
- List of railway stations in Japan
