= List of development projects in Tokyo =

This is a list of major urban development projects in Tokyo, Japan.

Project	Developer	Year of Completion	Costs	Description	Image
Akasaka Sacas		2008		A "New Urban Centre" project	
Ebisu Garden Place				A complex built over the former Yebisu Brewery in Ebisu, Shibuya. It houses a department store, various shops and eateries, offices, the brewery museum and Tokyo Metropolitan Museum of Photography. Accessible from JR Ebisu Station via the Yebisu skywalk	Ebisu Garden Place as seen from Tokyo Tower
Palette Town	Mori Building, Toyota Motor Corporation	1999	¥40 billion	A large entertainment complex located in Odaiba, a man-made island in Tokyo Bay. It featured several major attractions including the 115-meter-tall Daikanransha Ferris wheel, the European-themed VenusFort shopping mall, Toyota's MEGA WEB car theme park, and the Zepp Tokyo music venue. It later became home to the popular TeamLab Borderless digital art museum.	Odaiba
Omotesando Hills	Mori Building			A "New Urban Centre" project	
Roppongi Hills	Mori Building	2003	Over $4 billion	A "New Urban Centre" project	
Shiodome	Mitsui Fudosan	2006	¥500 billion	A major urban redevelopment of a former railway freight yard in Minato. It transformed the area into a mixed-use district featuring high-rise office towers, luxury hotels, residential buildings, shopping, and green spaces. Adjacent to Shimbashi Station, the project emphasizes transit-oriented development and has become a key business and commercial hub in Tokyo.	
Tokyo Station	East Japan Railway Company	2013	¥50 billion	Renovations of the historic Marunouchi side of Tokyo Station were completed in 2012, meticulously restoring its original 1914 red-brick façade and domed rooftops while incorporating modern seismic upgrades. Meanwhile, redevelopment of the Yaesu side, which included the addition of the GranRoof canopy and new commercial and office towers, was scheduled for completion in 2013 to modernize the station's eastern entrance and improve pedestrian access.	
Tokyo Midtown	Mitsui Fudosan	2007	¥370 billion	A mixed-use development in the Roppongi district of Minato. The complex includes shops, offices, residences, the Suntory Museum of Art, and the Ritz-Carlton Tokyo. Its central skyscraper, Midtown Tower, was the tallest building in Tokyo at the time of its completion, standing 248 meters tall. The site also features green spaces such as Midtown Garden and Hinokicho Park.	
