= Daitō, Osaka =

Daitō 大東市
- City
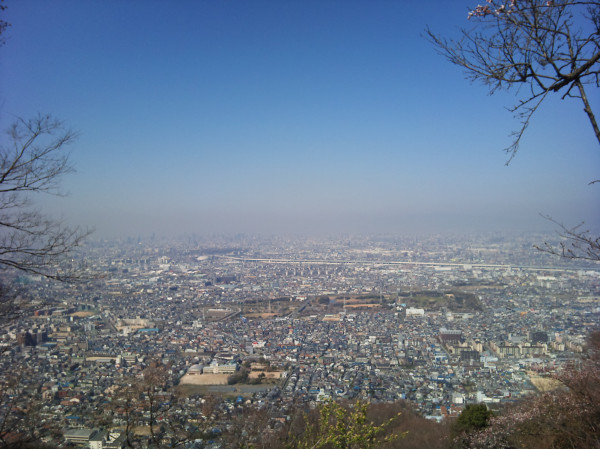
- View of Daitō, from mount Iimori

- Flag Emblem

- Location of Daitō in Osaka Prefecture

- Location in Japan
- Coordinates: 34°43′N 135°37′E
- Country: Japan
- Region: Kansai
- Prefecture: Osaka

Government
  - Mayor: Nobuko Osaka

Area
  - Total: 18.27 km^{2} (7.05 sq mi)

Population (January 31, 2022)
  - Total: 118,174
  - Density: 6,468/km^{2} (16,750/sq mi)
- Time zone: UTC+09:00 (JST)
- City hall address: 1-1-1 Tanigawa, Daitō-shi, Ōsaka-fu 574-8555
- Website: Official website
- Symbols
- Flower: Chrysanthemum
- Tree: Japanese Viburnum

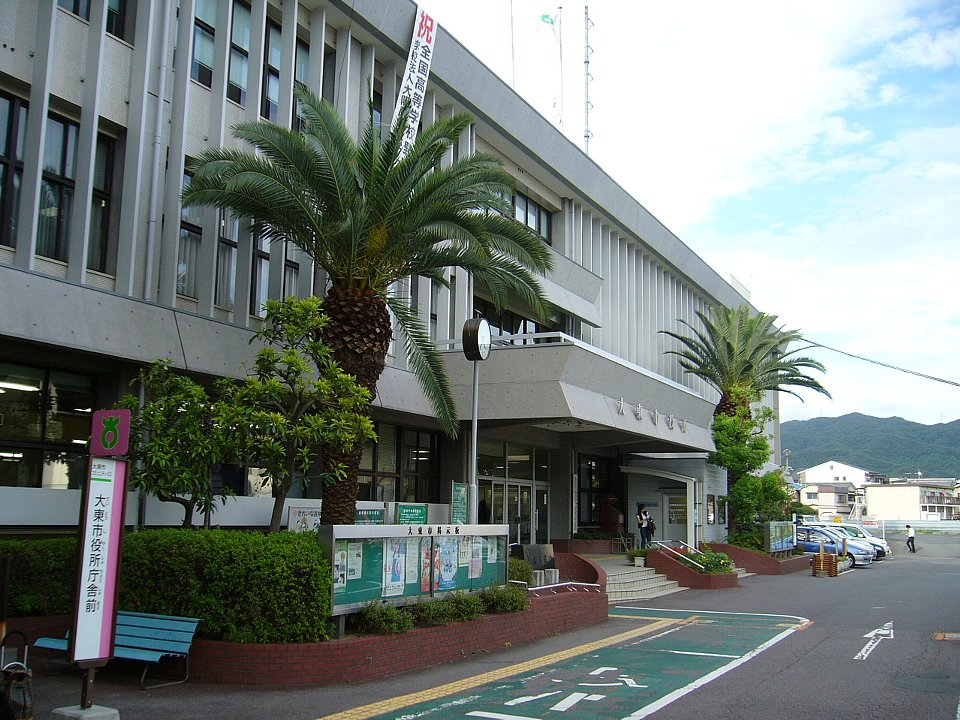
Daitō City Hall

Daitō (大東市, Daitō-shi; Japanese pronunciation: [dä̀í.tó̞ó̞, -tó̞ò̞.ɕì]) is a city located in Osaka Prefecture, Japan. As of 31 January 2022, the city had an estimated population of 118,174 in 57299 households and a population density of 6500 persons per km^{2}. The total area of the city is 18.27 square kilometres (7.05 sq mi).

== Geography ==
Daitō is located in the west central Osaka Prefecture, about 10 km from the city center of Osaka. The terrain is flat lowland, rising towards the Izumi Mountains in the east.

=== Neighboring municipalities ===
Nara Prefecture

- Ikoma

Osaka Prefecture

- Higashiōsaka
- Kadoma
- Shijōnawate
- Tsurumi-ku

== Climate ==
Daitō has a humid subtropical climate (Köppen Cfa) characterized by warm summers and cool winters with light to no snowfall. The average annual temperature in Daitō is 15.6 °C. The average annual rainfall is 1356 mm with September as the wettest month. The temperature is highest on average in August, at around 27.7 °C, and lowest in January, at around 4.2 °C.

== Demographics ==
Per Japanese census data, the population of Daitō has rose rapidly in the 1960s and 1970s and has since leveled off.

Historical population
Year	Pop.	±%
1920	12,261	—
1930	13,552	+10.5%
1940	18,556	+36.9%
1950	27,267	+46.9%
1960	35,354	+29.7%
1970	93,136	+163.4%
1980	116,635	+25.2%
1990	126,460	+8.4%
2000	128,917	+1.9%
2010	127,203	−1.3%
2015	123,217	−3.1%
2020	119,367	−3.1%

== History ==
The area of the modern city of Daitō was within ancient Kawachi Province. During the Jōmon period, the area was under Kawachi Bay, and inlet of Osaka Bay. By the Yayoi period, Kawachi Bay had become a lake, and many settlements arose on its shores. During the Kofun period, many burial mounds were built around the foot of Mount Iimori. Lake Kawachi continued to shrink in the Nara period and Heian period, and the area developed along the Higashikoya highway, which connected Mount Koya with Kyoto and with the coast. During the Sengoku period, the Miyoshi clan dominated Kawachi Province from their stronghold at Iimoriyama Castle. During the Edo Period, the Tokugawa shogunate diverted the course of the Yamato River as part of a massive flood control project, which also resulted in the creation of a large amount of new farmland. In addition to rice, the production of cotton and rapeseed created local prosperity.

The villages of Suminodo, Nango and Shijo were established with the creation of the modern municipalities system on April 1, 1889. On April 1, 1896 the area became part of Kitakawachi District, Osaka. Suminodo was raised to town status on January 1, 1937 and Shijo on April 1,1952. On April 1, 1956 Suminodo, Nango and Shijo to form the city of Daitō. The city suffered from flooding in 1972.

== Government ==
Daitō has a mayor-council form of government with a directly elected mayor and a unicameral city council of 17 members. Daitō, together with Shijōnawate, contributes two members to the Osaka Prefectural Assembly. In terms of national politics, the city is part of Osaka 12th district of the lower house of the Diet of Japan.

== Economy ==
Daitō has a mixed economy of commerce and light manufacturing, notably of electrical equipment and electrical appliances. Due to its proximity to the Osaka metropolis, it has also developed into a commuter town.

== Education ==
=== Universities and colleges ===
- Osaka Prefectural Fire Academy
- Osaka Sangyo University (Private university)
- Shijonawate Gakuen Junior College (Private university)
- Shijonawate Gakuen University (Private university)

=== Primary and secondary education ===
Daitō has 12 public elementary schools and eight public middle schools operated by the city government and two public high school operated by the Osaka Prefectural Department of Education. There are also one private element school, two private middle schools and three private high schools.

== Sports ==
- Sanyo Redthor, women's volleyball team

== Transportation ==
=== Railway ===
JR West – Katamachi Line (Gakkentoshi Line)

- Suminodo - Nozaki - Shijonawate

=== Highways ===
- Kinki Expressway
- National Route 170

== Local attractions ==
- Iimoriyama Castle, National Historic Site
- Jigen-ji (Nozaki Kannon)

== Notable people from Daitō ==
- Erika Kasahara, taekwondo practitioner
- Houka Kinoshita, actor
- Eri Murakawa, actress
- Takeya Nakamura, baseball player
- Yuma Nakayama, actor
- Tsuyoshi Nishioka, baseball player
- Hiroyuki Oze, baseball player
- Yoshinori Tateyama, baseball player
