= Uemachi Plateau =

The Uemachi plateau (上町台地, うえまちだいち, Uemachi Daichi) is a plateau in Osaka City, Japan, that extends from the Osaka Castle and Tenmabashi area to Tennōji in the south.

== History and formation ==
Based on post-war university studies of geological strata and faults, and examination of old maps, it is assumed that by around the 5th century a sandbank had been formed, and that this eventually became the Uemachi plateau. It is believed that in the Jōmon period the Uemachi plateau was a sandbank that separated the Inland Sea to the West from Kawachi Bay to the East. Ever since then large amounts of sediment have been deposited from the Yodo River and the Yamato River. Kawachi Bay turned into Kawachi Lake, then into swampland, and finally into an alluvial plain surrounded by hills. Similarly, due to the movement of the rivers, the western side of the plateau became the plain that is now the center of Osaka City.

In contrast to the relatively gentle slope on the eastern side of the plateau, the descent on the western side is steep. This is because of the deposit of large amounts of sediment from the upper reaches of the Yodo and Yamato rivers, which are on the eastern side of the plateau. On the western side of the plateau there are deposits at sea level from Osaka Bay.

By 700 AD, the region directly to the east of Uemachi plateau had been largely filled in by the debris and sediment deposited by the Yamato and Yodo Rivers. The highest point of the plateau is at the base of the main tower of Osaka Castle, 38 meters above sea level.

The names of two wards of Osaka City, Higashinari-ku and Nishinari-ku, originate from the formation of the Uemachi plateau.

The Uemachi fault passes through the western part of the Uemachi plateau.
