= Jigen-ji =

Buddhist temple in Osaka Prefecture, Japan

Coordinates: 34°43′09″N 135°38′41″E

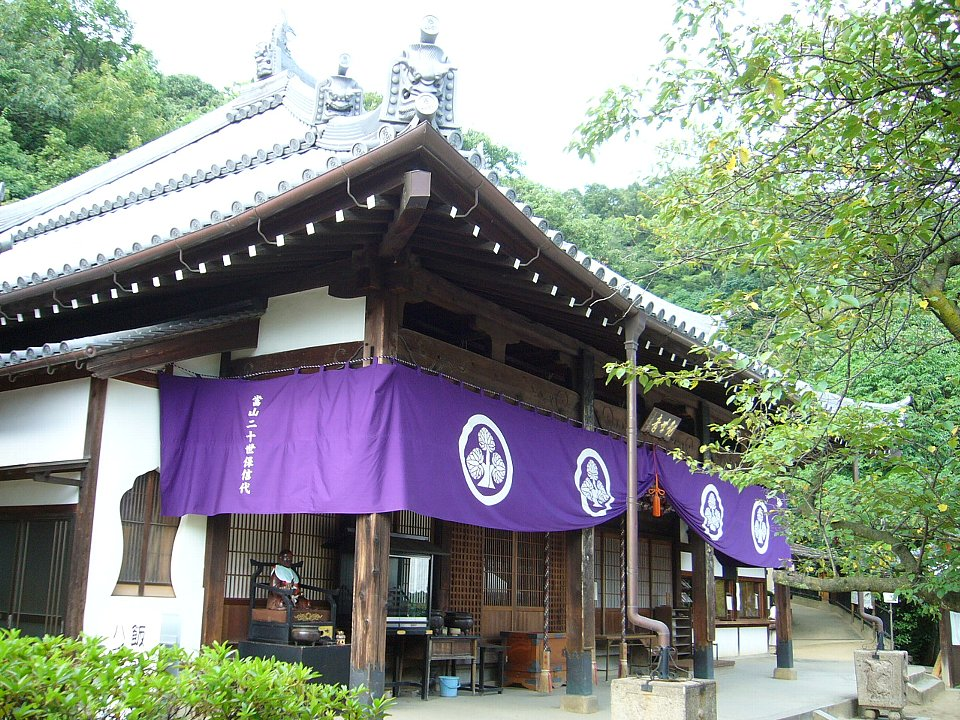
Jigen-ji Temple

Jigen-ji (慈眼寺), also known as Nozaki Kannon (野崎観音), is a temple located at the foot of Mt. Iimori, in Daitō, Osaka Prefecture, Japan. It is famous for the 11-faced statue of Kanzeon Bosatsu, or Kannon, that it enshrines.

== History ==
The Kannon statue enshrined at Jigen-ji Temple is said to have been carved out by a high priest Gyōki (668-749). According to legend, the temple was completely burnt down by the soldiers of Miyoshi and Matsunaga in 1565, and the Kanzeon Bosatsu statue miraculously survived. The temple was rebuilt in 1616 by priest Seigan, and making pilgrimages to Nozaki Kannon became popular circa the Genroku and Hōei periods (1688 to 1710).

== Legacy ==
Buddhist services (法会, Hōe) are held in the spring and the fall, and it is a custom for believers to make pilgrimages to Jigen-ji Temple called "Nozaki Mairi" (野崎参り). The popularity of the pilgrimage is described in many documents, including Onnakoroshi Abura no Jigoku by Chikamatsu Monzaemon, and Shinpan Uta Zaimon by Chikamatsu Hanji. There is even a rakugo (traditional Japanese comedy) performance titled "Nozaki Mairi." The pilgrimage to Jigen-ji Temple was immortalized by the song "Nozaki-kouta" by Tarō Shōji, which describes the tragic love affair between a merchant's daughter named Osome and a shop boy named Hisamatsu.

In older times, the area of Jigen-gi Temple's location was connected by water, and it was possible to approach the temple by boat. A historic popular belief was that winning a verbal argument between those visiting by boat, and those visiting by land, would bring the winner happiness for the entire year.

Even today, from May 1 to 10th of every year, the approach from the Nozaki Station of the JR Gakkentoshi Line to Nozaki Kannon becomes crowded with fair stalls, attracting more than 200,000 pilgrims and spectators.

== Additional relics ==
A painting of Shakyamuni Buddha in state of nirvana called "Shaka Nehan Zu" is kept at Jigen-ji Temple as a treasure, along with a stone monument inscribed with a poem by Matsuo Bashō.
