= Shijonawate Gakuen University =

Coordinates: 34°43′52.5″N 135°38′27″E

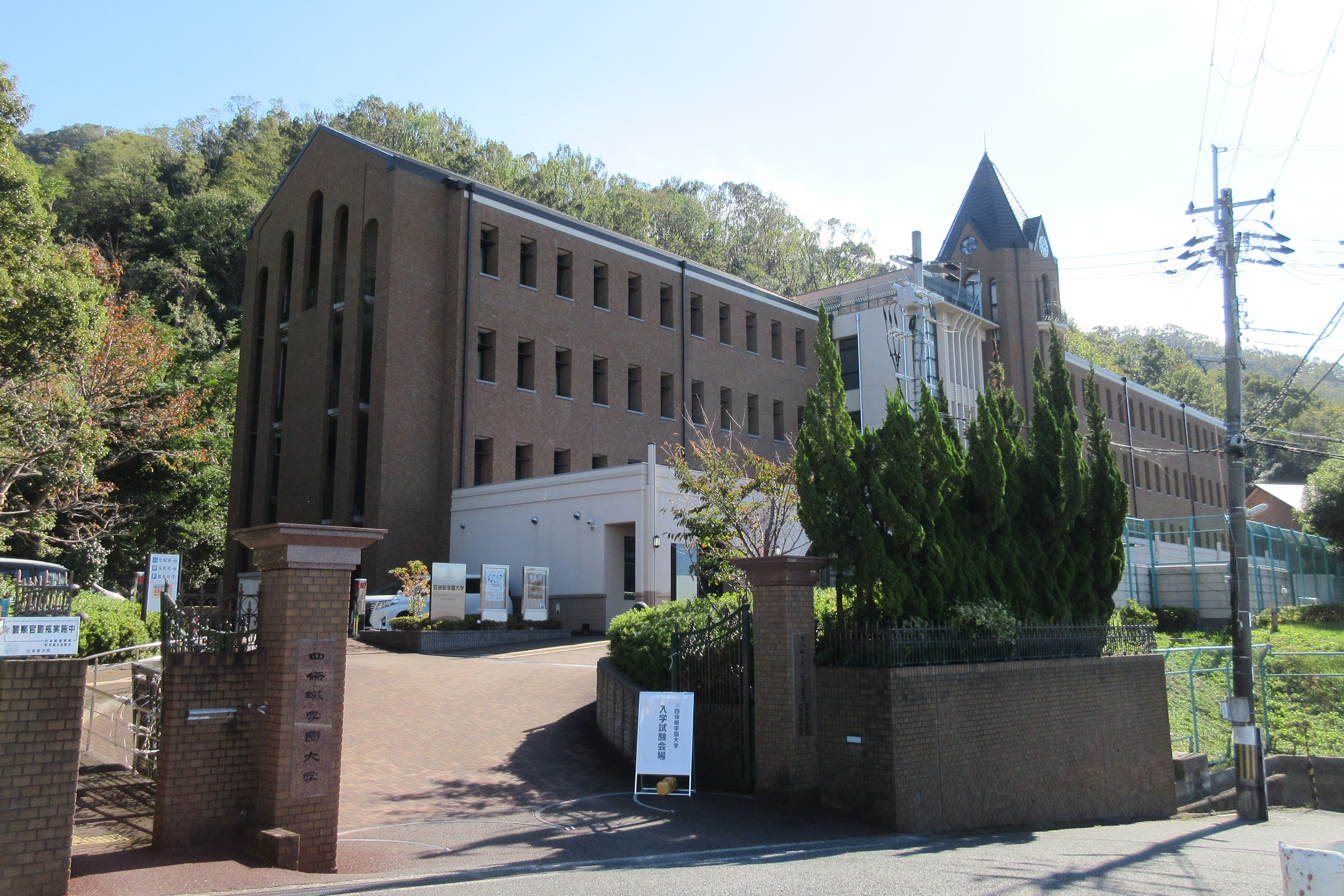

Shijonawate Gakuen University (四條畷学園大学, Shijōnawate gakuen daigaku) is a private university in Daitō, Osaka, Japan. The predecessor of the school was founded in 1926, and it was chartered as a university in 2004. It is attached to Shijonawate Gakuen Junior College. It is located in front of Shijōnawate Station.
