= Shijonawate Gakuen Junior College =

Coordinates: 34°43′52″N 135°38′25.6″E

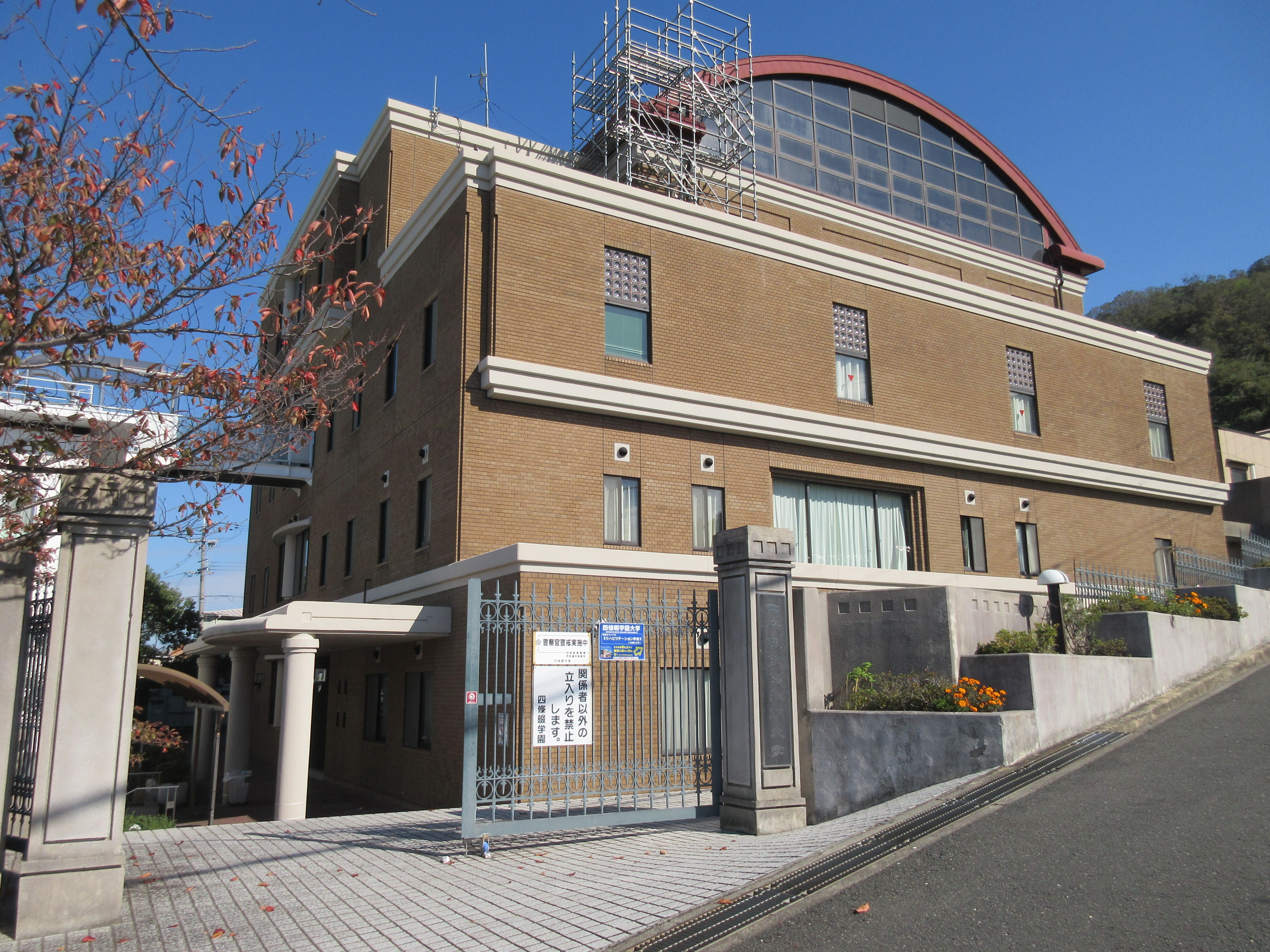

Shijonawate Gakuen Junior College (四條畷学園短期大学, Shijōnawate gakuen tanki daigaku) is a private junior college in Daitō, Osaka, Japan. The precursor of the school was founded in 1926, and it was chartered as a university in 1964. It is attached to Shijonawate Gakuen University. It is located in front of Shijōawate Station.
