= Hiroyuki Oze =

Japanese baseball player (1985–2010)

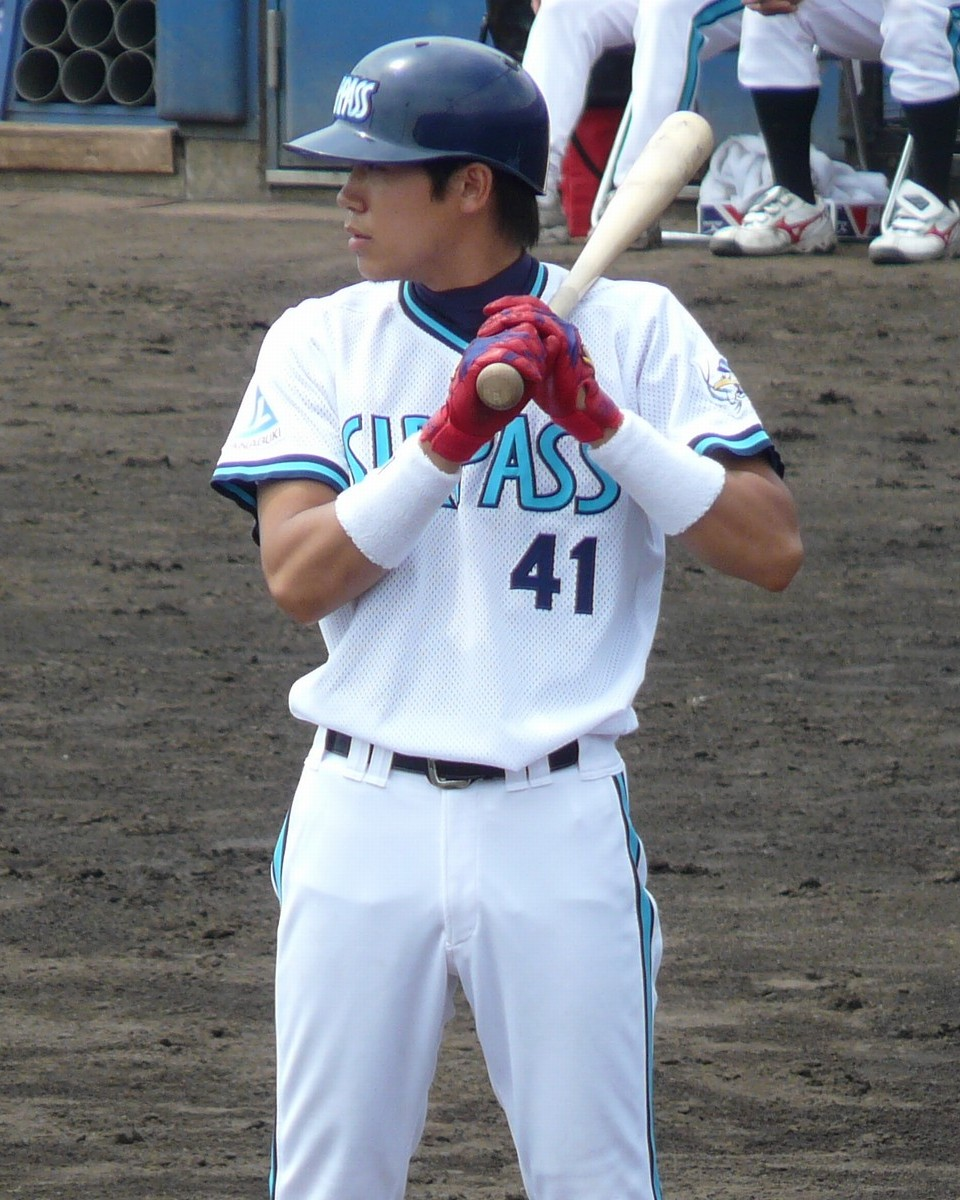
- Oze in 2008
- Outfielder
- Born: September 2, 1985; Daitō, Osaka, Japan
- Died: February 5, 2010 (aged 24); Miyakojima, Okinawa, Japan
- Batted: Left Threw: Right

NPB debut
- July 15, 2008, for the Orix Buffaloes

Last appearance
- October 9, 2009, for the Orix Buffaloes

Career statistics
- Batting average: .287
- Stolen bases: 14
- Runs batted in: 30
- Hits: 94
- Stats at Baseball Reference

Teams
- Orix Buffaloes (2008–2009)

Hiroyuki Oze (小瀬 浩之, Oze Hiroyuki; September 2, 1985 – February 5, 2010) was a Japanese baseball outfielder from Daitō, Osaka who played professionally for the Orix Buffaloes. He played two seasons for the club, hitting .262 in his rookie year in 2008 and .303 in 2009, his final professional season. Before joining the Buffaloes, he played at Jinsei Gakuen High School and Kinki University, where he was drafted in 2007. Oze received the memorable nickname "José" from Orix alum Ichiro Suzuki during the latter's visit to Buffaloes spring training.

Oze died on February 5, 2010, in an apparent suicide by jumping from the tenth floor of his hotel during spring training in Miyakojima, Okinawa.
