= Tempozan Ferris Wheel =

- 天保山大観覧車 (Japanese)
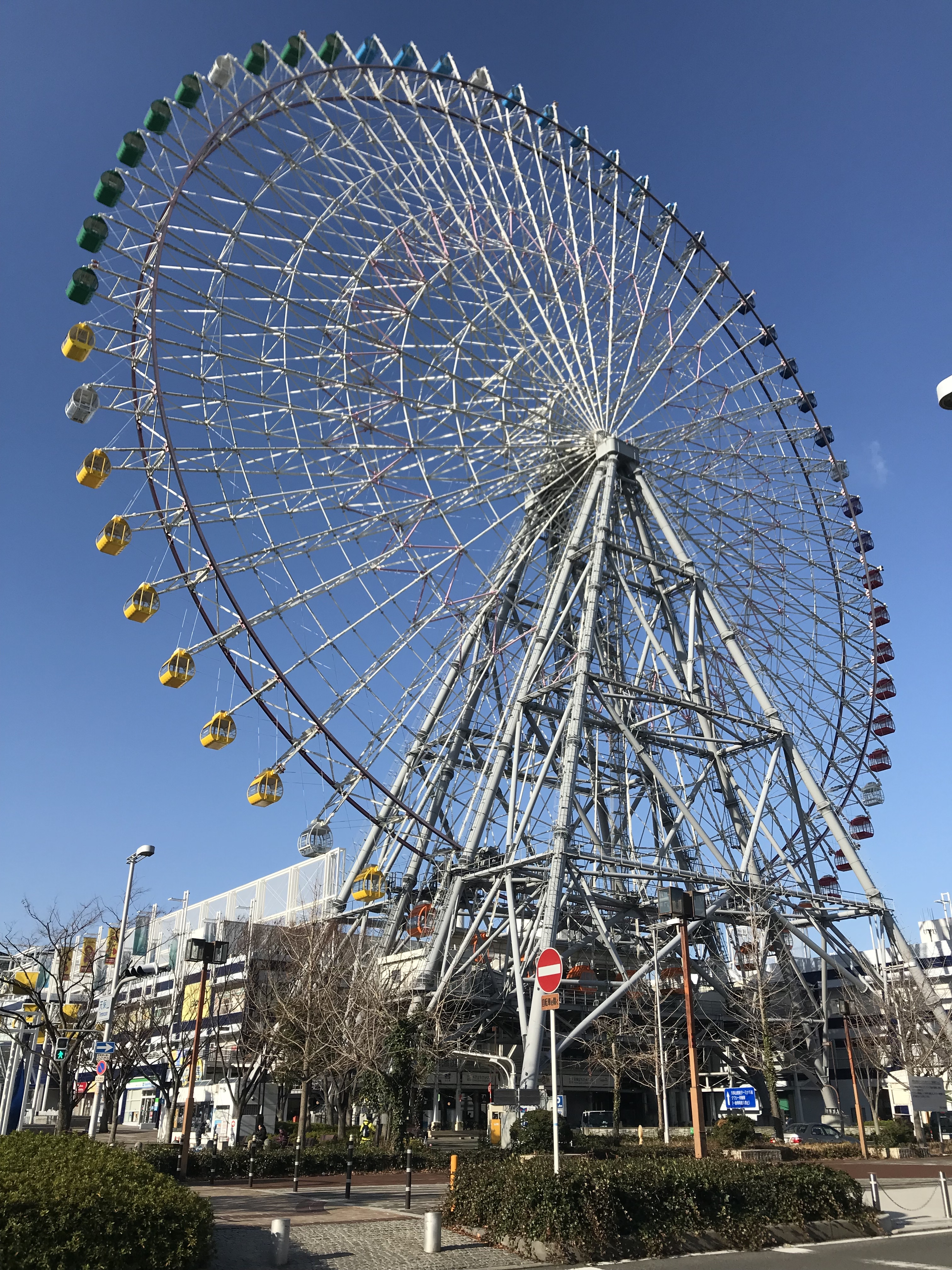
- Tempozan Ferris Wheel in 2019
- Interactive map of the Tempozan Ferris Wheel area

General information
- Type: Ferris wheel
- Location: Osaka, Japan
- Coordinates: 34°40′N 135°26′E
- Construction started: 21 July 1997

Height
- Height: 112.5 metres (369 ft)

Website
- http://tempozan-kanransya.com/

Tempozan Ferris Wheel (Japanese: 天保山大観覧車, Hepburn: Tenpōzan Daikanransha) is a 112-meter-tall (367 ft) Ferris wheel located in Osaka, Japan, at Tempozan Harbor Village, next to Osaka Aquarium Kaiyukan, one of the largest aquariums in the world. The wheel has a height of 112.5 metres (369 ft) and diameter of 100 metres (330 ft).

== Description ==
Tempozan Ferris Wheel opened to the public on July 12, 1997, and was then the tallest Ferris wheel in the world. During the 17-minute ride it offers a view of Osaka Bay and surrounding areas, including Mount Ikoma to the east, Akashi Kaikyō Bridge to the west, Kansai International Airport to the south, and the Rokko Mountains to the north.

The wheel has colored lights that provide a weather forecast for the next day. Orange lights indicate a sunny day, green lights a cloudy day and blue lights indicate rain.

The Daikanransha Ferris wheel at Palette Town in Odaiba, Tokyo, which opened in 1999, has the same diameter as Tempozan, but 2.5 metres more in total height. Sky Dream Fukuoka opened in 2002 and has a diameter of 112 metres and a total height of 120 metres, but ceased operating in September 2009. The Diamond and Flower Ferris Wheel at Kasai Rinkai Park, east of Tokyo, opened in 2001 and has a diameter of 111 metres and a height of 117 metres.

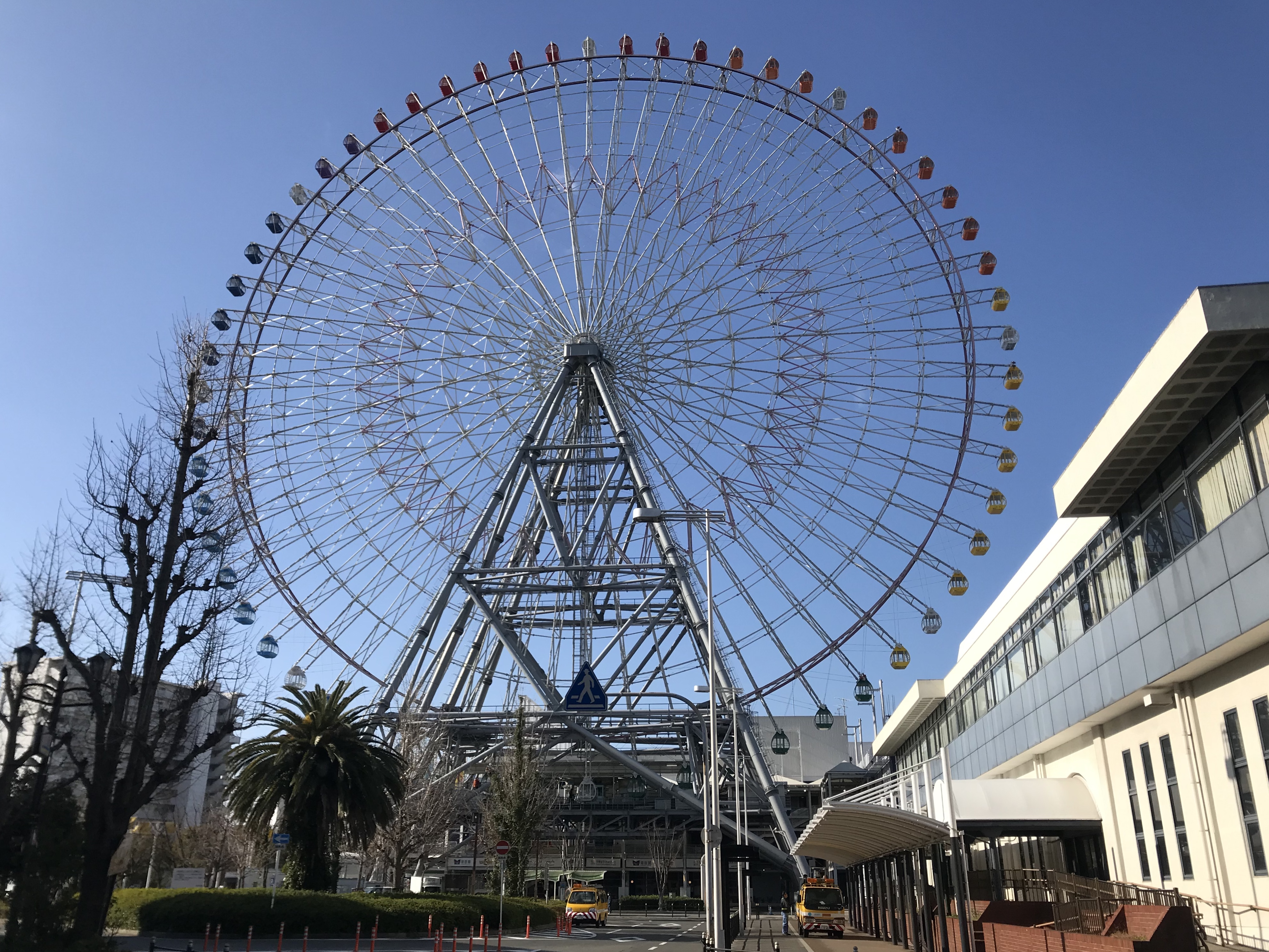
Tempozan Ferris Wheel

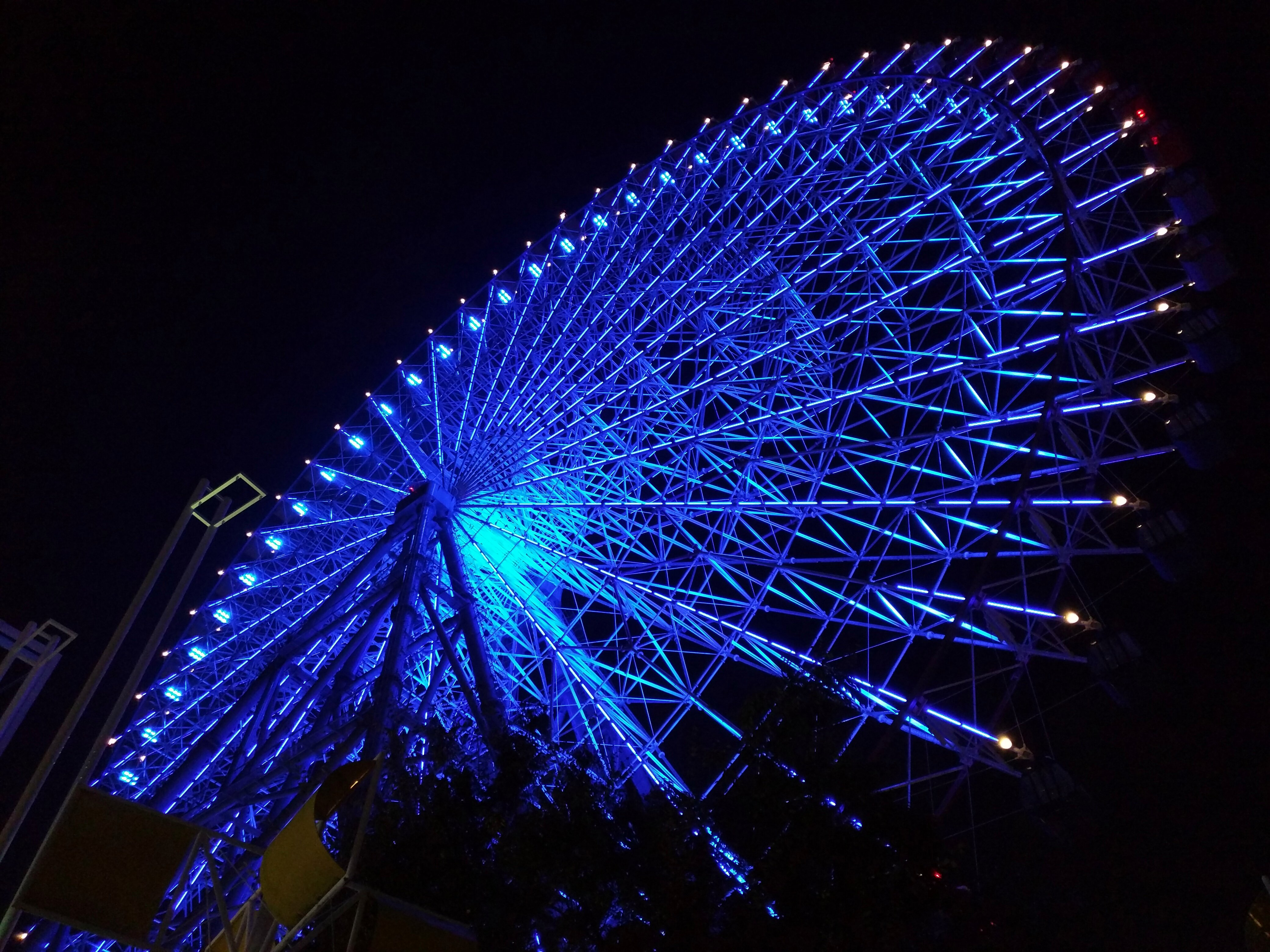
The illumination of the Ferris wheel

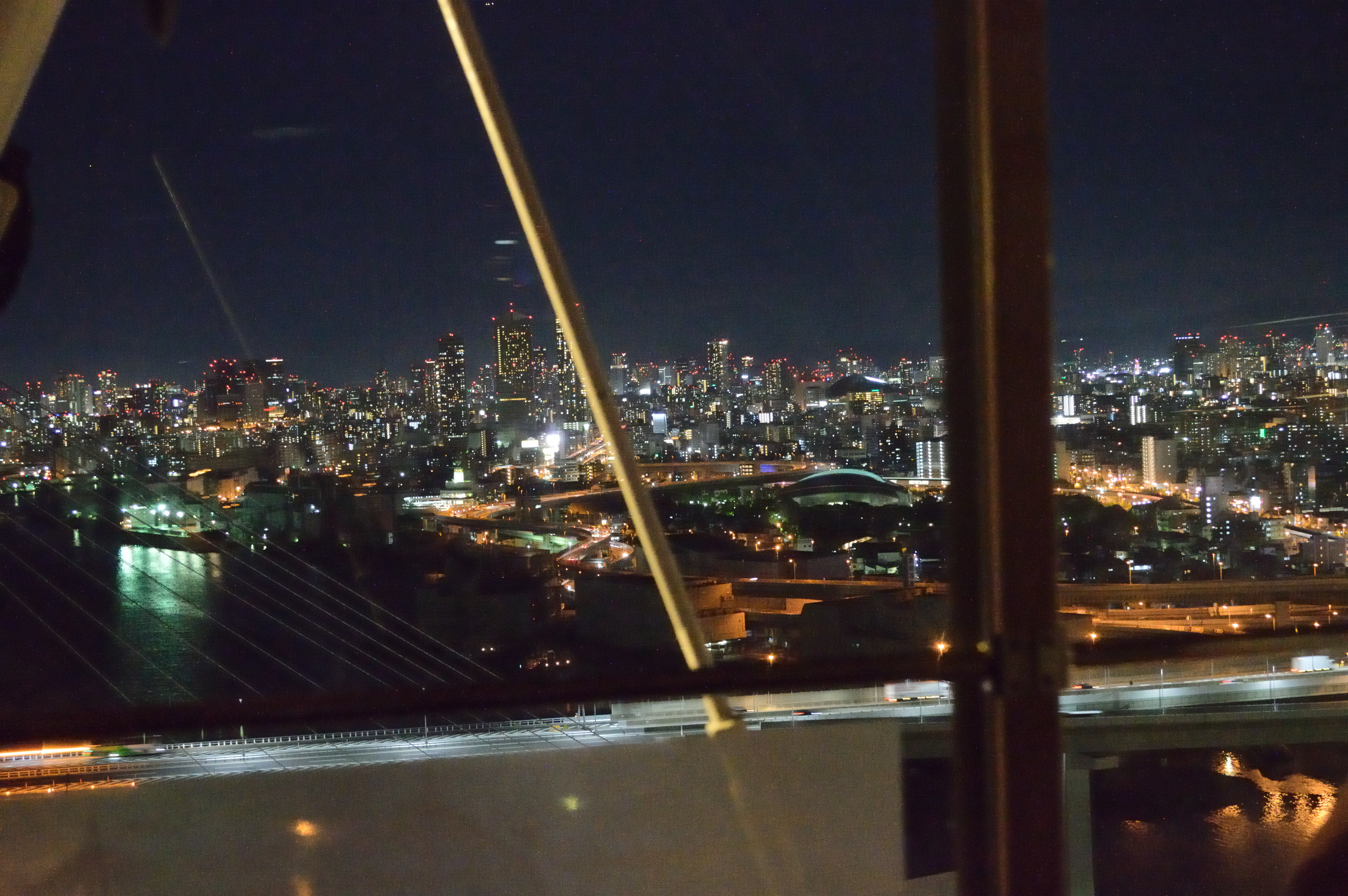
Night-time view from the Ferris wheel

== See also ==
- Akashi Kaikyō Bridge
- World's tallest Ferris wheels

Preceded by Igosu 108	World's tallest Ferris wheel 1997–1999	Succeeded by Daikanransha
