= Sanyo Redthor =

Japanese volleyball club

- Founded: 1962
- Ground: Daitō, Osaka, Japan
- Manager Head coach: (Japan) Masayoshi Yasue (Japan) Hiroaki Sakamoto
- League: V.Challenge League
- 2010-11: 4th place
- Website: Club home page

Sanyo Electric Redthor (三洋電機レッドソア) is a women's volleyball team based in Daitō, Osaka, Japan. It plays in the V.Challenge League. The club was founded in 1962. The owner of the team is Sanyo Electric. "Thor" stems from Norse mythology.

== History ==
- It was founded in 1962.
- It promoted to V.Challenge League in 2002.

== Honours ==
- V.Challenge League
  - Champions(2) - 2004, 2007
  - Runner-Up(1) - 2009

== League results ==
League		Position	Teams	Matches	Win	Lose
V1.League	5th (2002–03)	4th	8	14	7	7
V1.League	6th (2003–04)	4th	7	12	6	6
V1.League	7th (2004–05)	Champion	8	14	12	2
V1.League	8th (2005–06)	3rd	8	14	11	3
V・challenge	2006-07	Champion	8	14	13	1
V・challenge	2007-08	4th	8	14	10	4
V・challenge	2008-09	Runner-Up	10	18	14	4
V・challenge	2009-10	3rd	12	16	11	5
V・challenge	2010-11	4th	12	19	14	5

== Current squad ==
As of November 2011

- 2 (Japan) Aya Watanabe
- 3 (Japan) Yuki Sasaki (Captain)
- 4 (Japan) Yukari Amano
- 6 (Japan) Moe Sasaki
- 9 (Japan) Mika Terasawa
- 10 (Japan) Natsuki Kitakami
- 13 (Japan) Mami Suda
- 15 (Japan) Chiaki Yokoe
- 16 (Japan) Yuka Matsuno
- 17 (Japan) Tomomi Shinjo
- 18 (Japan) Natsumi Shimamura

== Former players ==
- (Japan) Miki Shimada
- (Japan) Hiromi Hatanaka
- (Japan) Eri Kosaka
- (Japan) Aya Sakata
- (Japan) Yu Tsuchitani
- (Japan) Nozomi Yamasaki
- (Japan) Yuki Kimura
- (Japan) Hiroka Yamada
- (Japan) Eri Tokugawa
- (Japan) Sayaka Nakano
- (Japan) Ayako Hoshi
- (Japan) Asaka Kurokawa
- (Japan) Yoko Hayashi
