= Palette Town =

Former shopping mall and entertainment complex in Tokyo, Japan

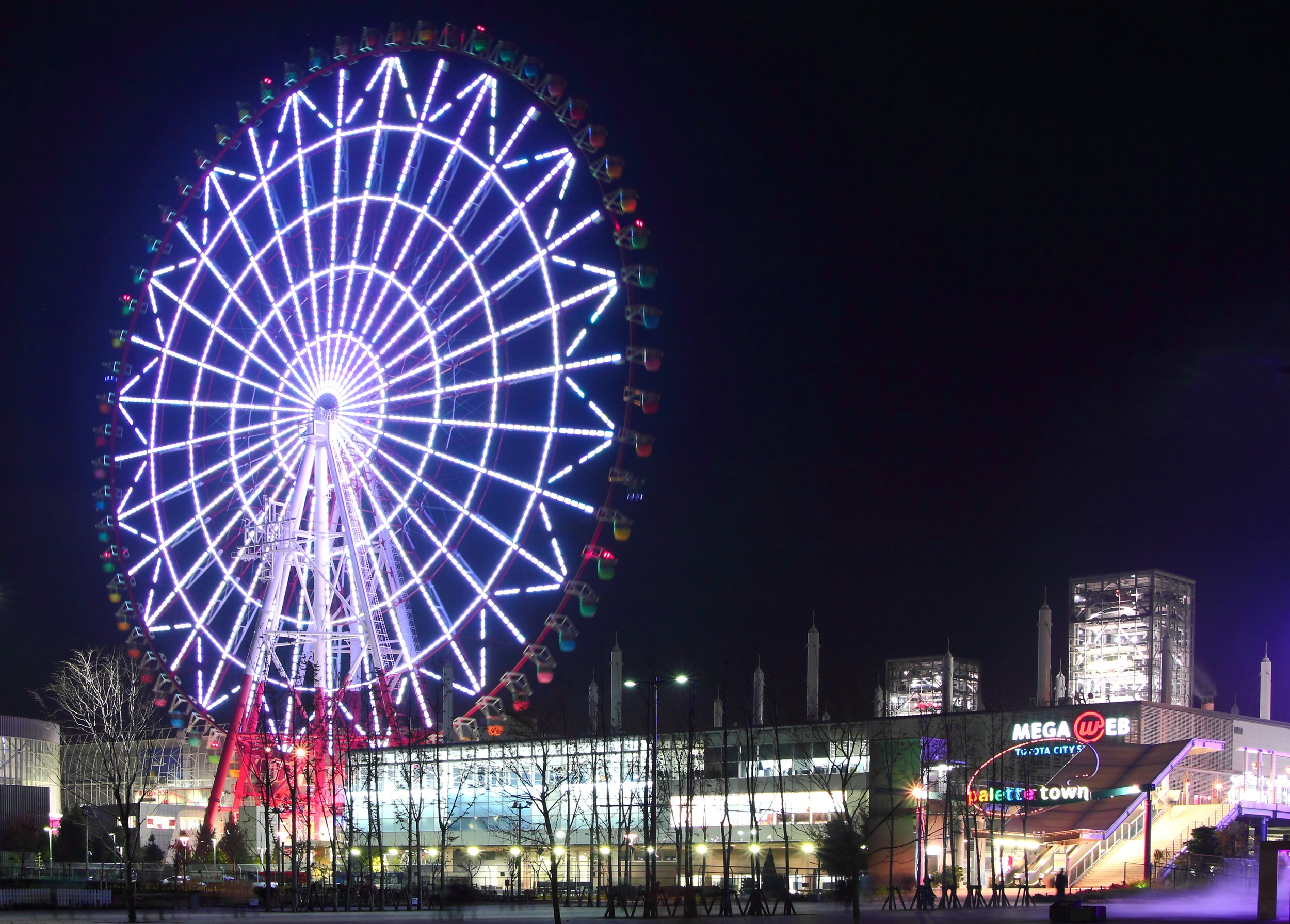
- The complex at night, 2014
- Location: Odaiba, Tokyo, Japan
- Coordinates: 35.6262°N 139.7822°E
- Opened: March 19, 1999
- Closed: August 31, 2022
- Website: Official website

Palette Town was a shopping mall and entertainment complex in Odaiba, Tokyo, Japan, it opened on March 19, 1999, and closed on August 31, 2022, and the facilities have been closed for redevelopment of the area.

== Features ==
Features included:

- Daikanransha, a Ferris wheel
- Mega Web, exhibition hall of car maker Toyota
- Mori Building Digital Art Museum: Epson team Lab "Borderless"
- Tokyo Leisure Land, 24-hour video gaming, karaoke, bowling
- VenusFort, a Venice-themed shopping mall

== Gallery ==
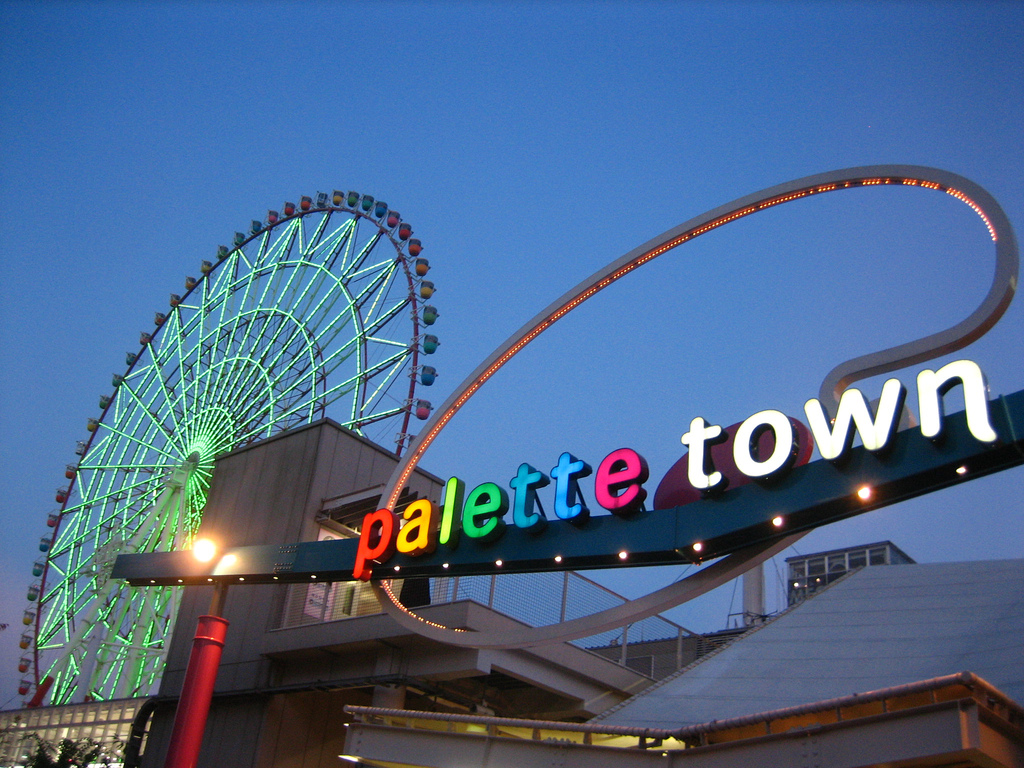
Signage for the mall with the Daikanransha in the background, 2007

== See also ==
- List of shopping malls in Japan
