= Mega Web =

Car theme park in Tokyo, Japan

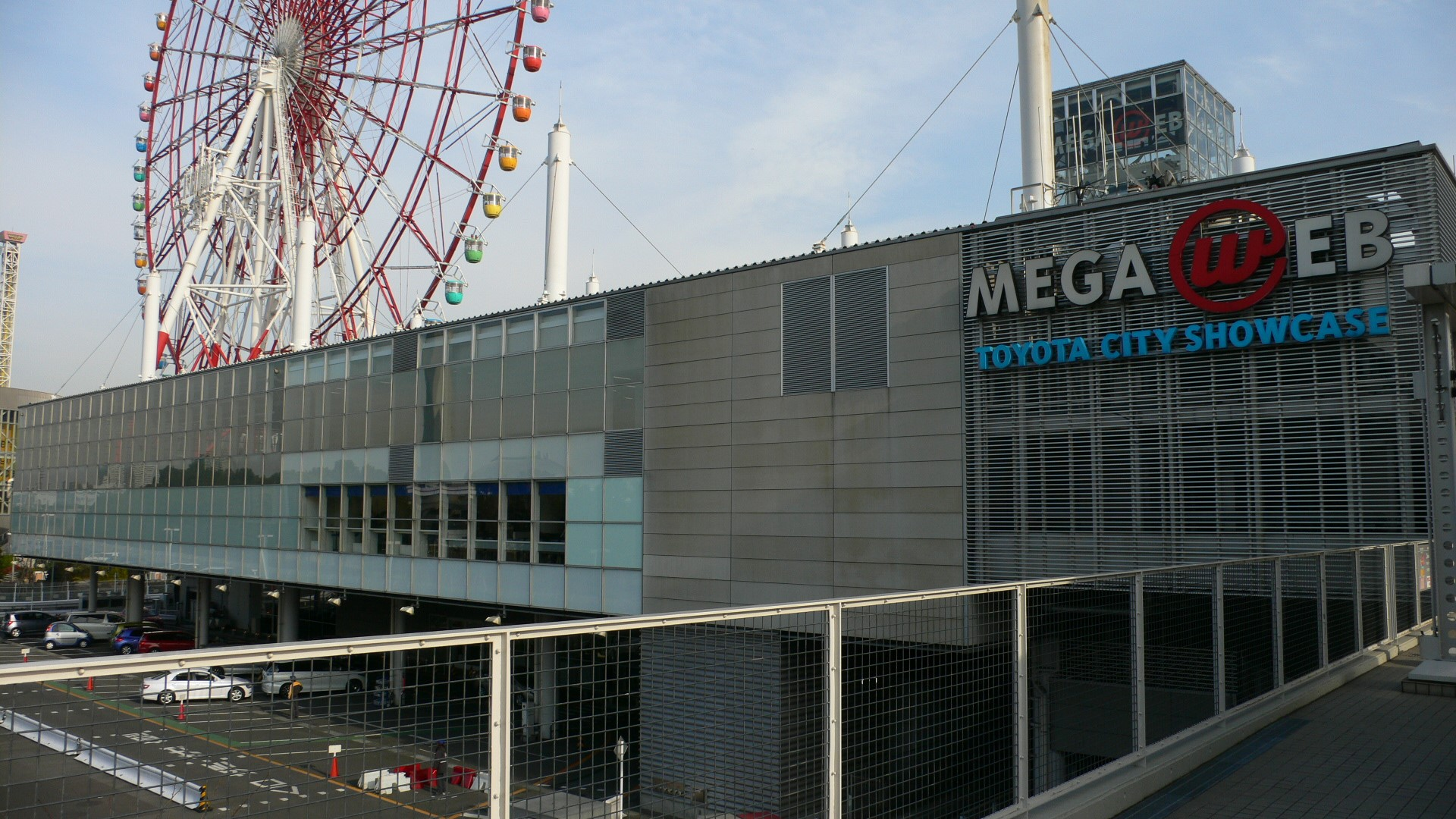
- Exterior in 2007
- Interactive map of Mega Web
- Location: Tokyo, Japan
- Coordinates: 35.6258°N 139.7813°E
- Closed: December 31, 2021
- Operated by: Toyota
- Theme: Cars
- Website: About Mega Web

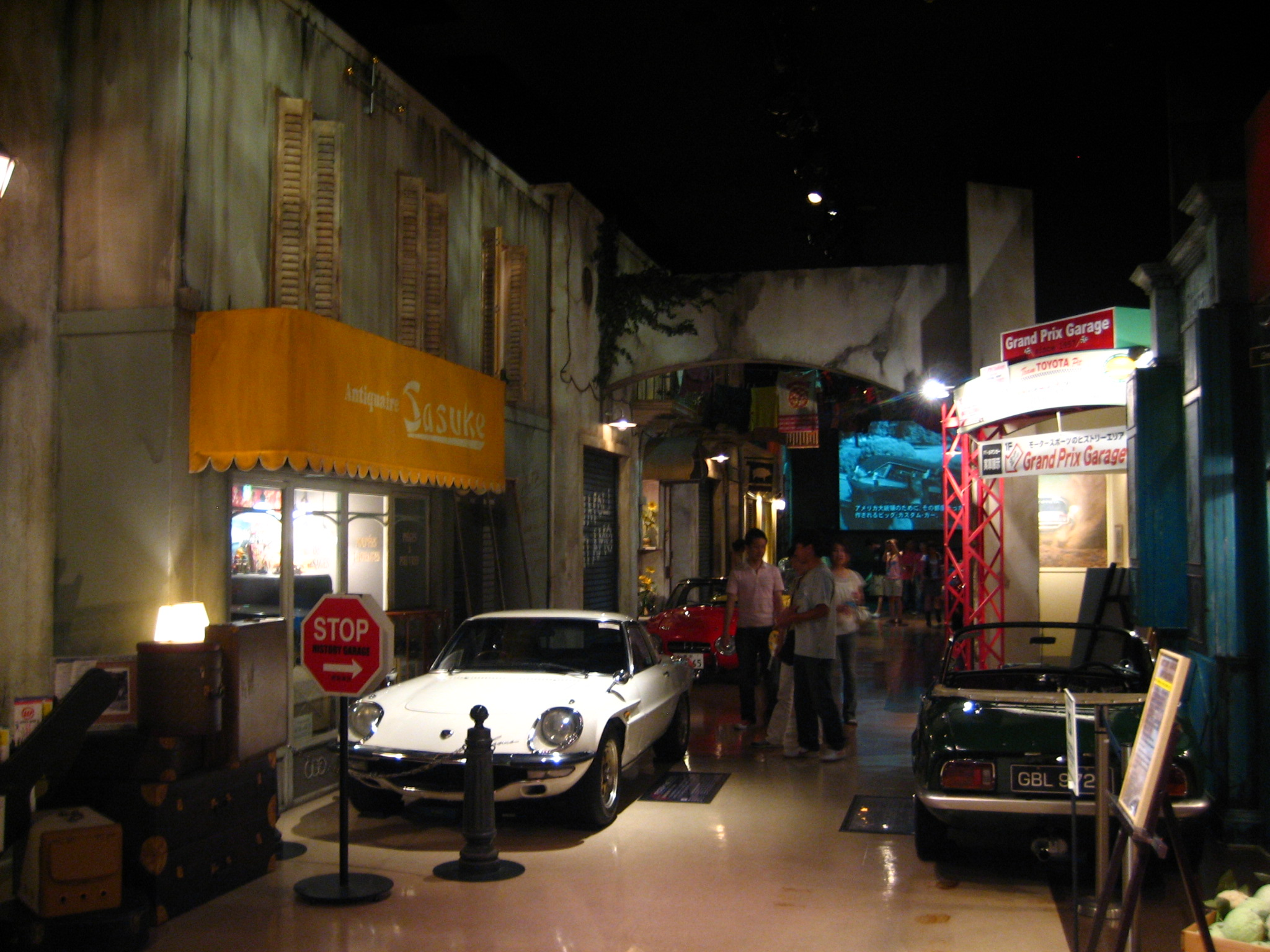
History Garage interior

Mega Web, or Megaweb, was a car theme park operated by Toyota in Odaiba's Palette Town, Tokyo, Japan. The Toyota City Showcase displayed vehicles and had a 1.3 kilometer course for test driving. Ride Studio offered mini car driving and the Waku-Doki simulated race track driving. The History Garage displayed a collection of 1950s–1970s automobiles. Mega Web and the Historic Garage closed permanently on December 31, 2021, as part of Palette Town's anticipated redevelopment.

== See also ==
- List of museums in Tokyo
