= Daikanransha =

Coordinates: 35.6263915°N 139.7822902°E

- 大観覧車
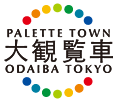

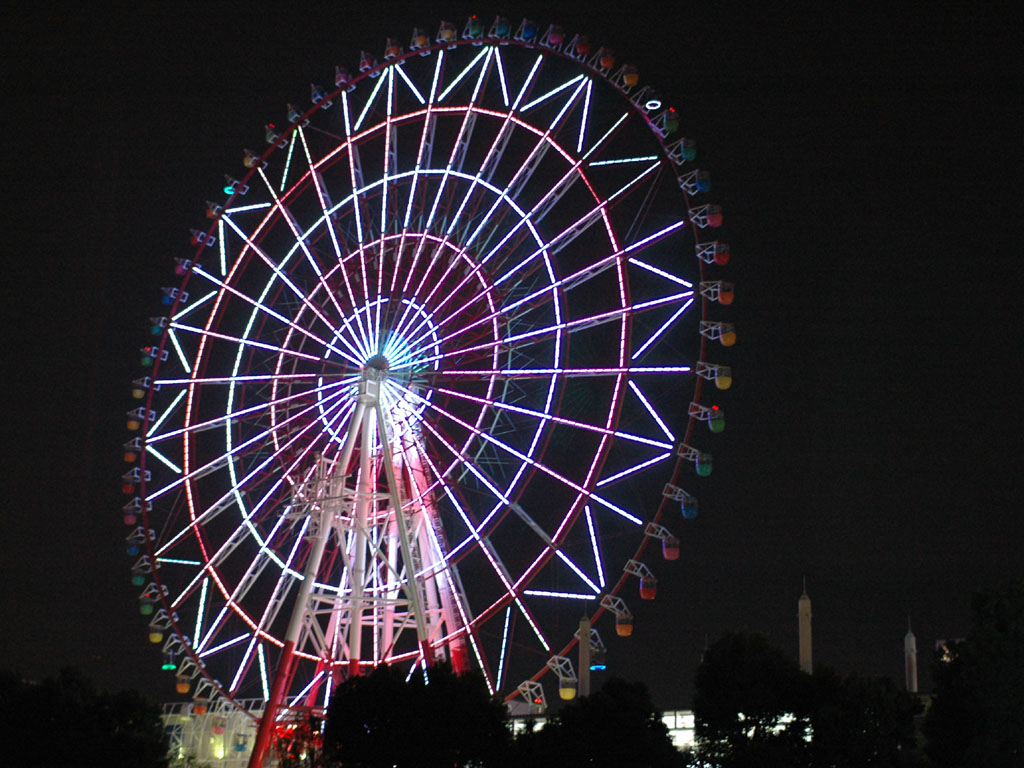
- Alternative names: Giant Sky Wheel, Palette Town Giant Ferris Wheel

General information
- Status: Demolished
- Type: Ferris wheel
- Location: Odaiba, Tokyo, Japan
- Opened: March 19, 1999
- Closed: August 31, 2022
- Owner: Sanoyas Ride Co., Ltd

Height
- Height: 115 metres (377 ft)

Dimensions
- Diameter: 100 metres (328 ft)

Website
- http://www.daikanransha.com/

Daikanransha (大観覧車) was a 115-metre (377 ft) tall Ferris wheel at Palette Town shopping mall in Odaiba, Japan.

== Description and history ==
When it opened in March 1999, it was the world's tallest Ferris wheel. It has the same 100-metre (328 ft) diameter as its world record predecessor, the Tempozan Ferris Wheel, at Osaka, but its overall height is 2.5 metres (8.2 ft) greater. Daikanransha lost its world's tallest status to the 135-metre (443 ft) London Eye, which officially opened on December 31, 1999, but which did not open to the public until March 2000 because of technical problems. It also lost its title as Japan’s tallest Ferris wheel to the Diamond and Flower Ferris Wheel and Sky Dream Fukuoka in 2001, followed by the Redhorse Osaka Wheel in 2016.

It is the third tallest Ferris wheel ever constructed in Japan, Asia's 10th tallest and the world's 12th tallest wheel ever constructed.

Daikanransha was visible from the central urban area of Tokyo. During its 16-minute ride, passengers could observe key landmarks, including Tokyo Tower, the twin-deck Rainbow Bridge, Tokyo Skytree, Tokyo Gate Bridge, and Haneda Airport, as well as the skyscrapers of Shinjuku. On clear days, visibility extended to the Bōsō Peninsula and Mount Fuji, Japan’s highest peak.

The Ferris wheel featured a total of 64 gondolas, most of which were renowned for their rainbow-colored design. However, four special gondolas were made entirely of transparent polycarbonate, offering a see-through experience. These transparent gondolas were also equipped with air conditioning for passenger comfort.

Passengers had the opportunity to take a commemorative photo before boarding the gondola.

It has been featured in anime like Digimon Adventure and Inuyasha.

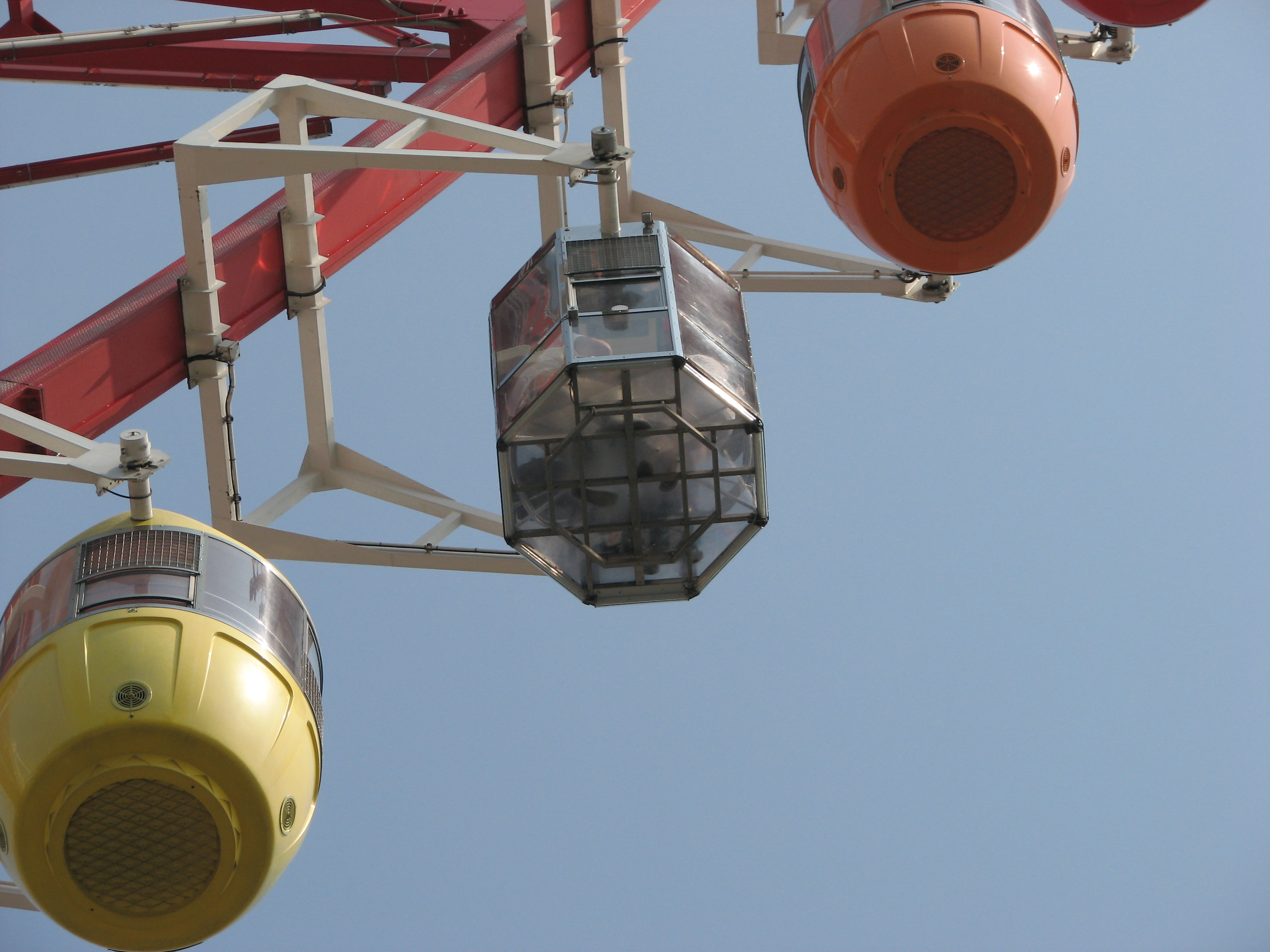
One of the see-through gondolas

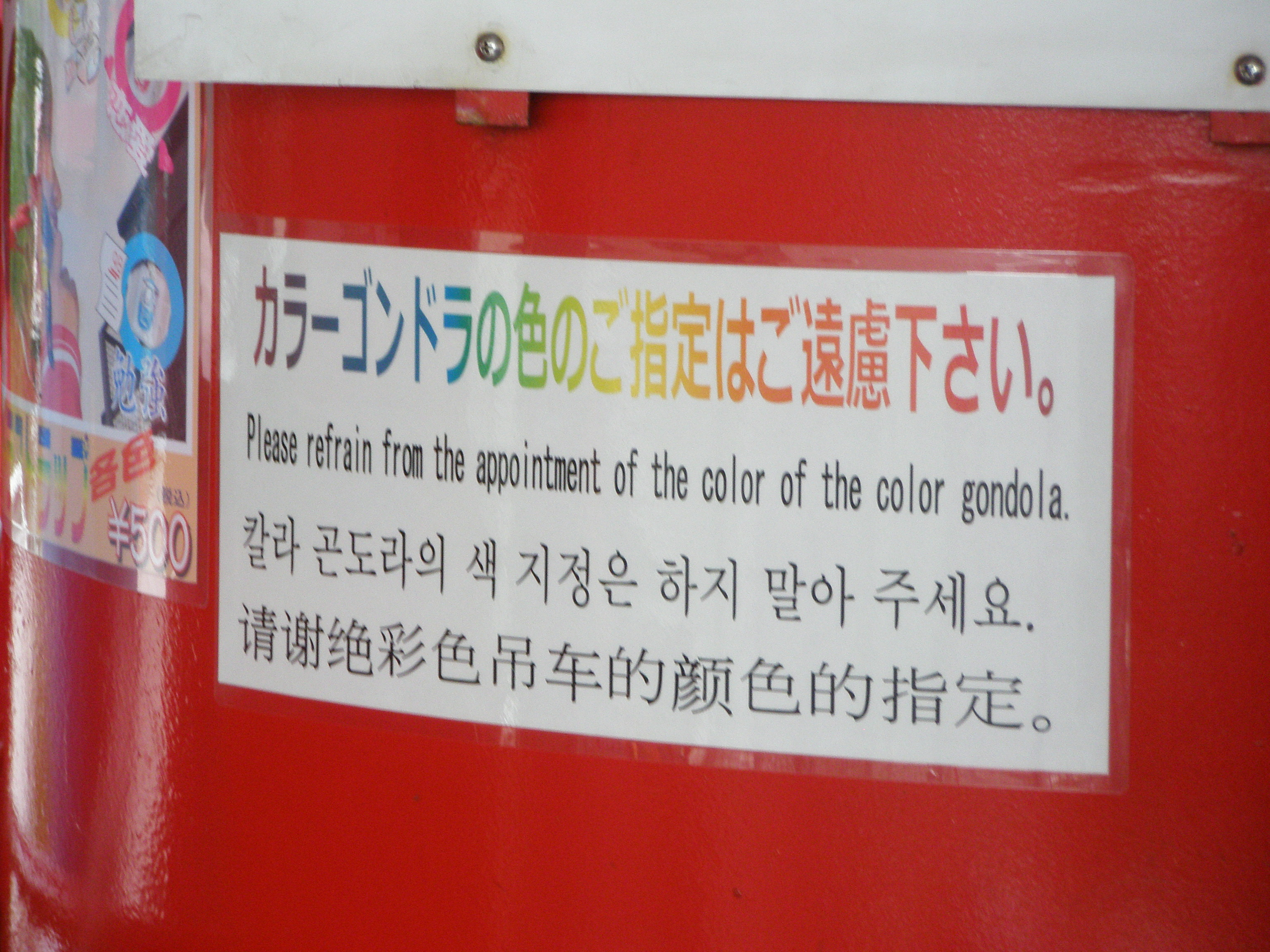

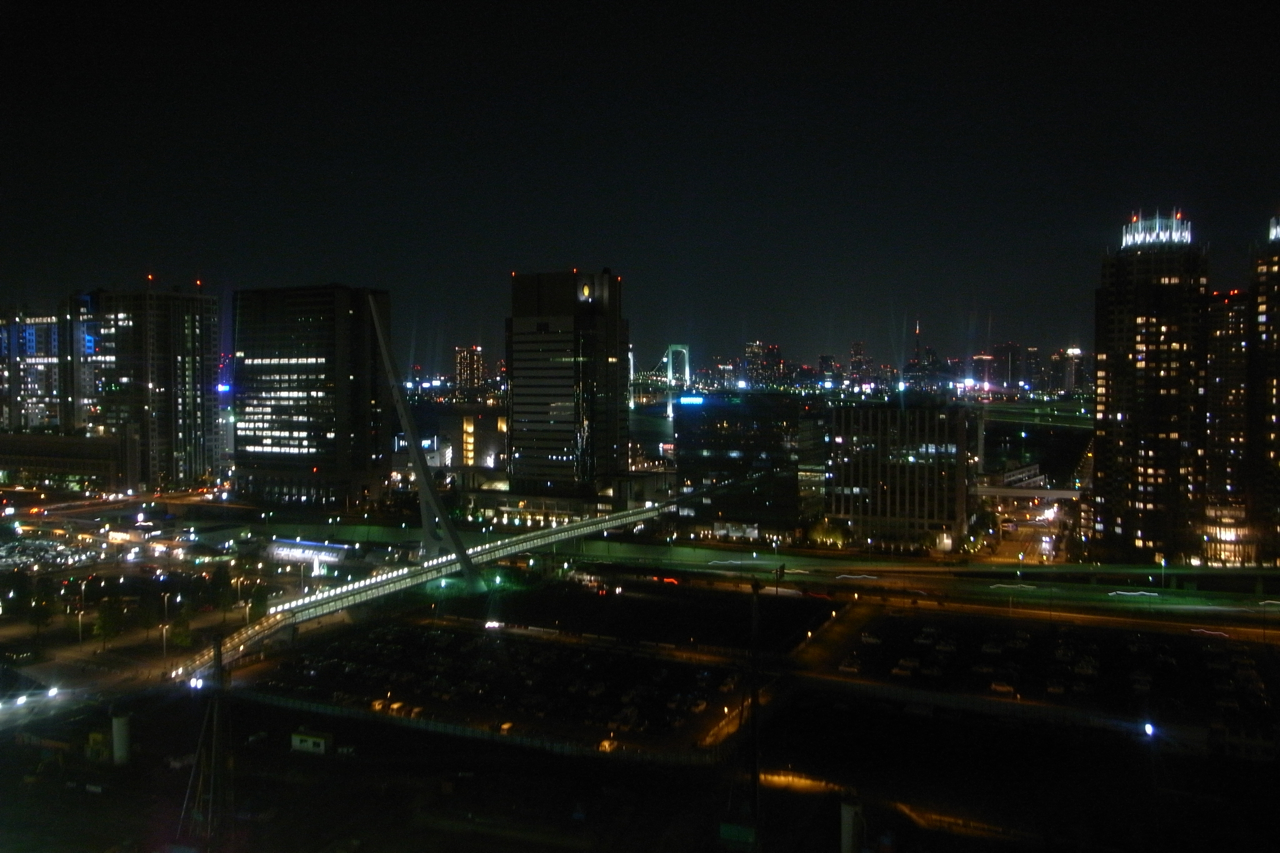
Night-time view from the Ferris wheel

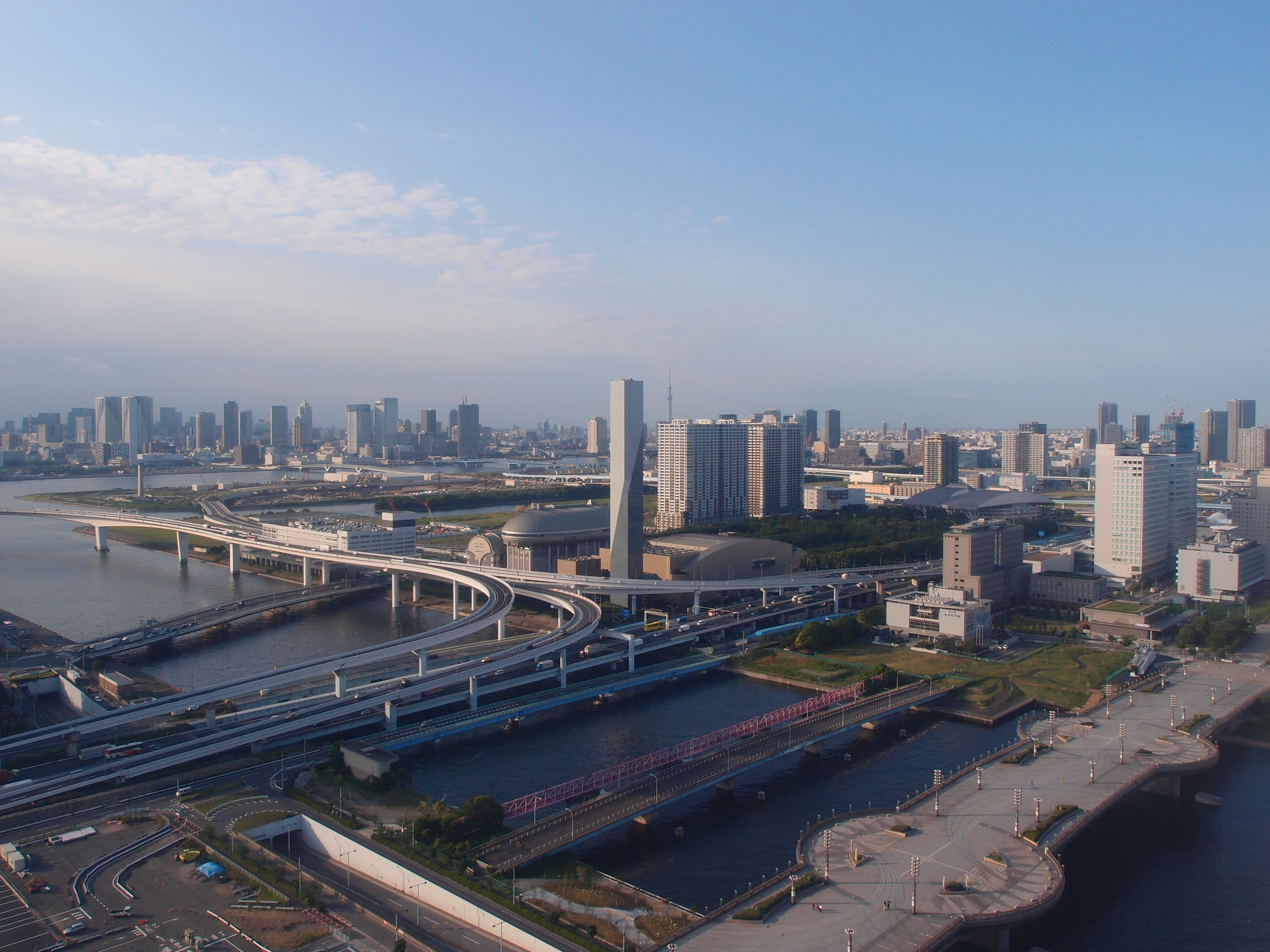
Day-time view from the Ferris wheel

== Illumination ==
At night, the Ferris wheel was illuminated by approximately 120,000 neon tubes, programmed to display various patterns in over 100 colors. In March 2013, the lighting system underwent a renovation, introducing seasonal-themed displays, including cherry blossoms for spring, snowflakes for winter, autumn leaves for fall, and watermelons for summer. The nighttime view from Daikanransha earned it the distinction of "No. 1 Night View from a Ferris Wheel" and a place among Japan’s top 20 observation spots.

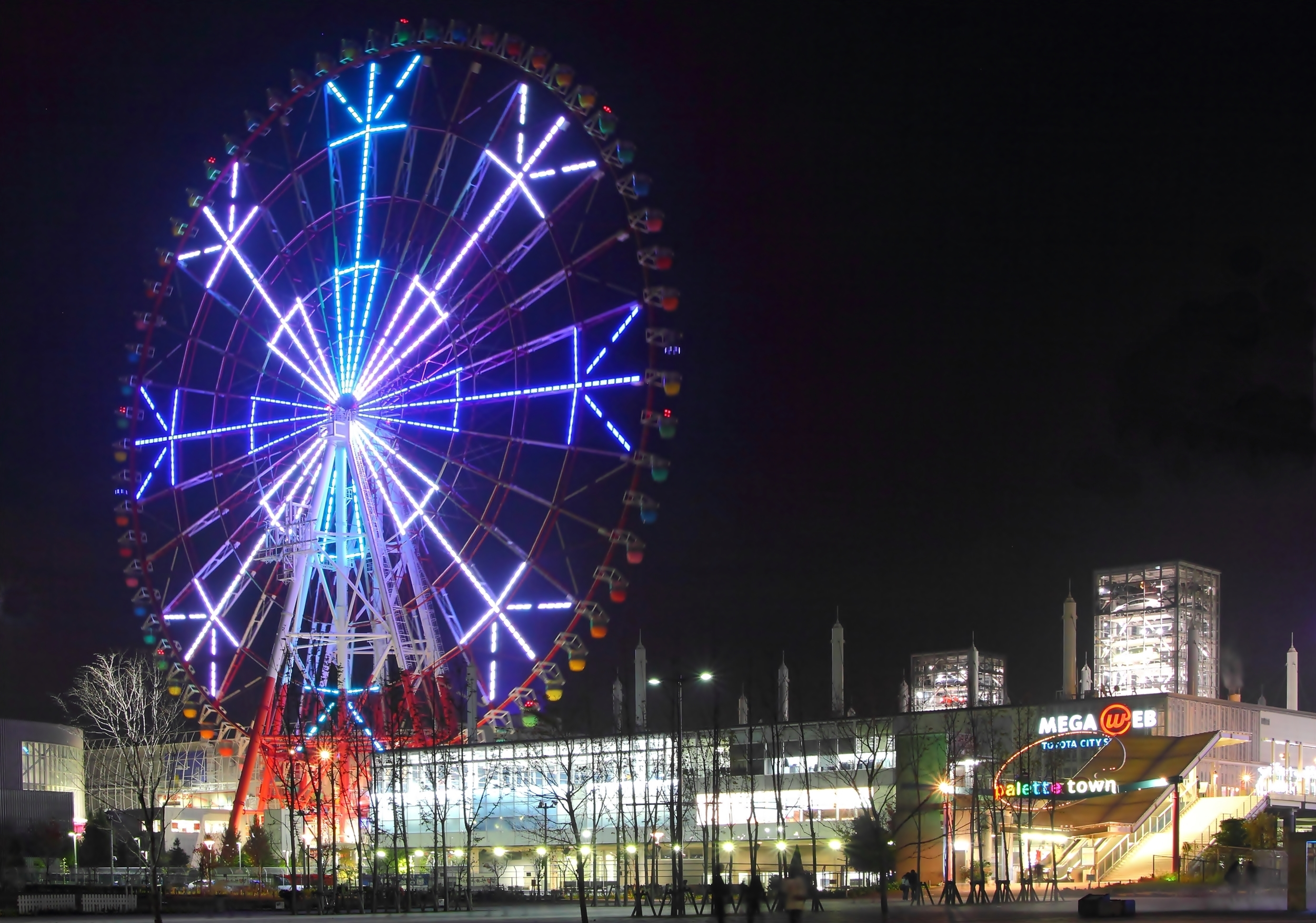
The winter illumination pattern

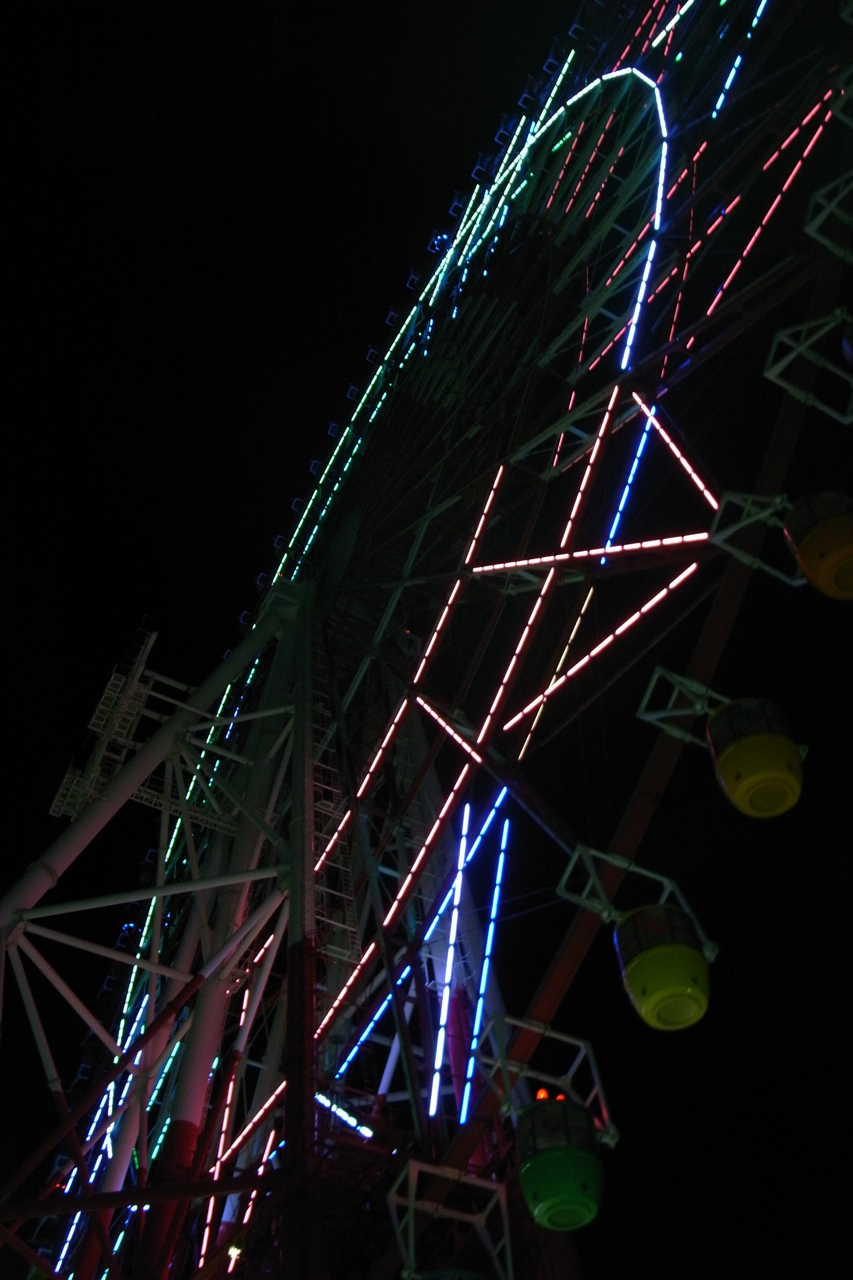
Hello Kitty illumination pattern

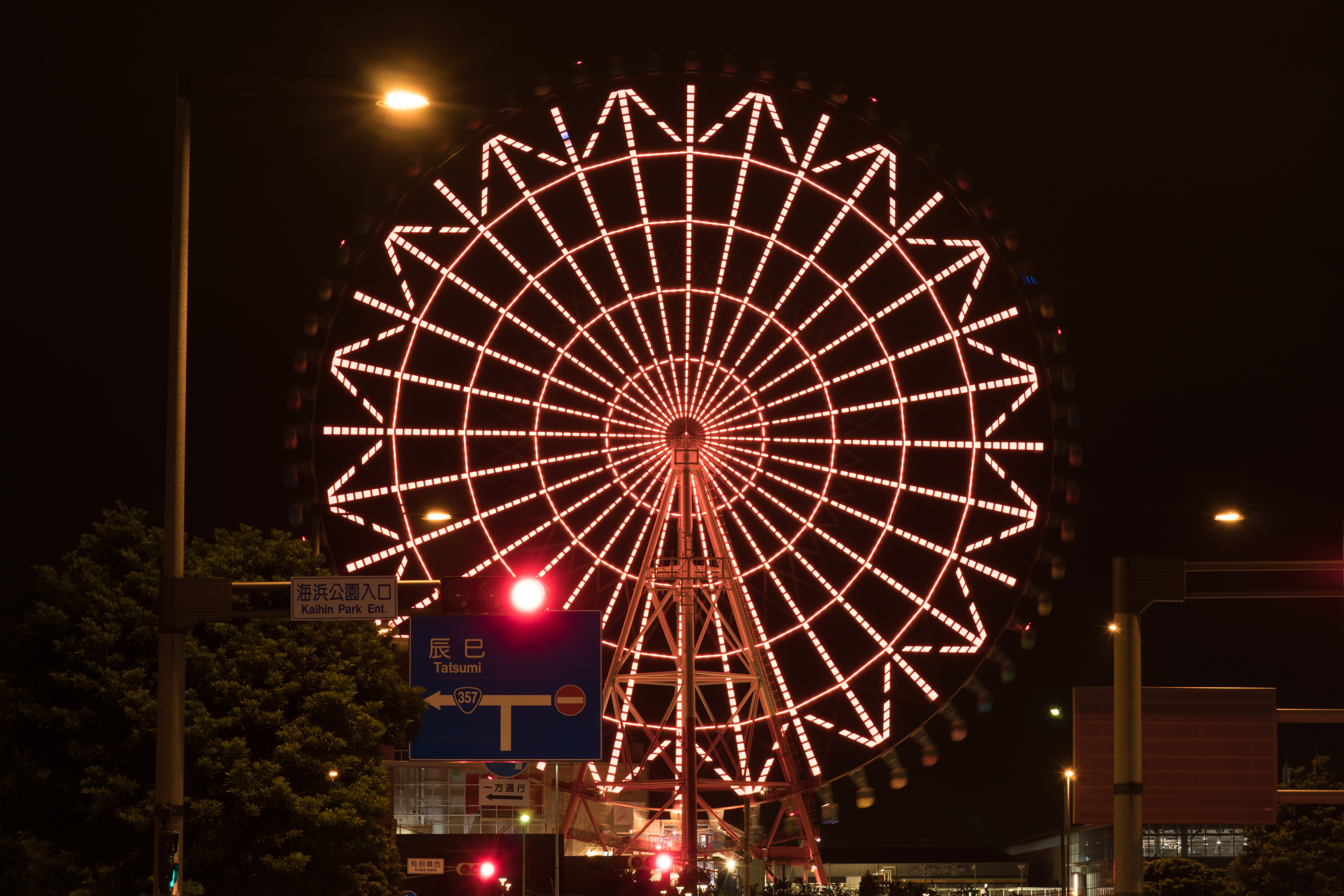

== Closure ==
As part of the redevelopment plan for the entire Palette Town, the Ferris wheel was scheduled to close at the end of August 2022. Demolition work commenced in September 2023 and was completed by the end of November 2023. A new multi-purpose arena, Toyota Arena Tokyo, along with various commercial facilities, is set to be developed on the former Palette Town site.

Following the dismantling of the Daikanransha Ferris wheel in late 2022, several of its gondolas found new homes. On December 24, 2022, a gondola was installed at the Kashimayari Ski Resort in Ōmachi City, Nagano Prefecture. The resort, aiming to enhance its "winter theme park" concept for non-skiers, received the gondola as a complimentary gift from the previous owner. Relocating the entire Ferris wheel within Japan was deemed unfeasible due to legal revisions, and international inspections were hindered by the COVID-19 pandemic. However, the gondolas remained durable, prompting their repurposing to introduce amusement park elements to the ski resort. Additionally, on May 18, 2023, another gondola was installed at Nasu Highland Park in Nasu Town, Tochigi Prefecture.

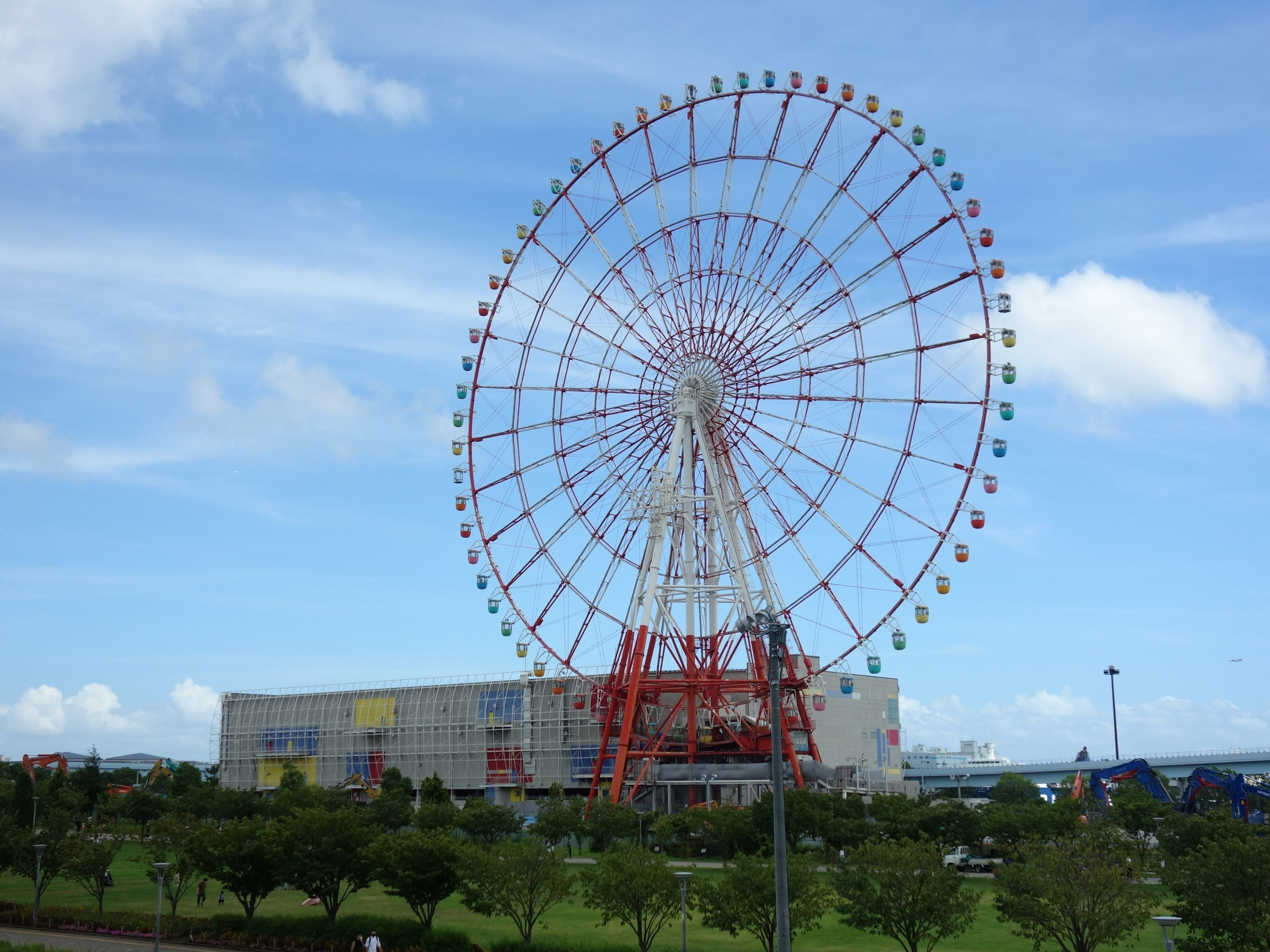
The Ferris wheel on the closing day (August 31, 2022)

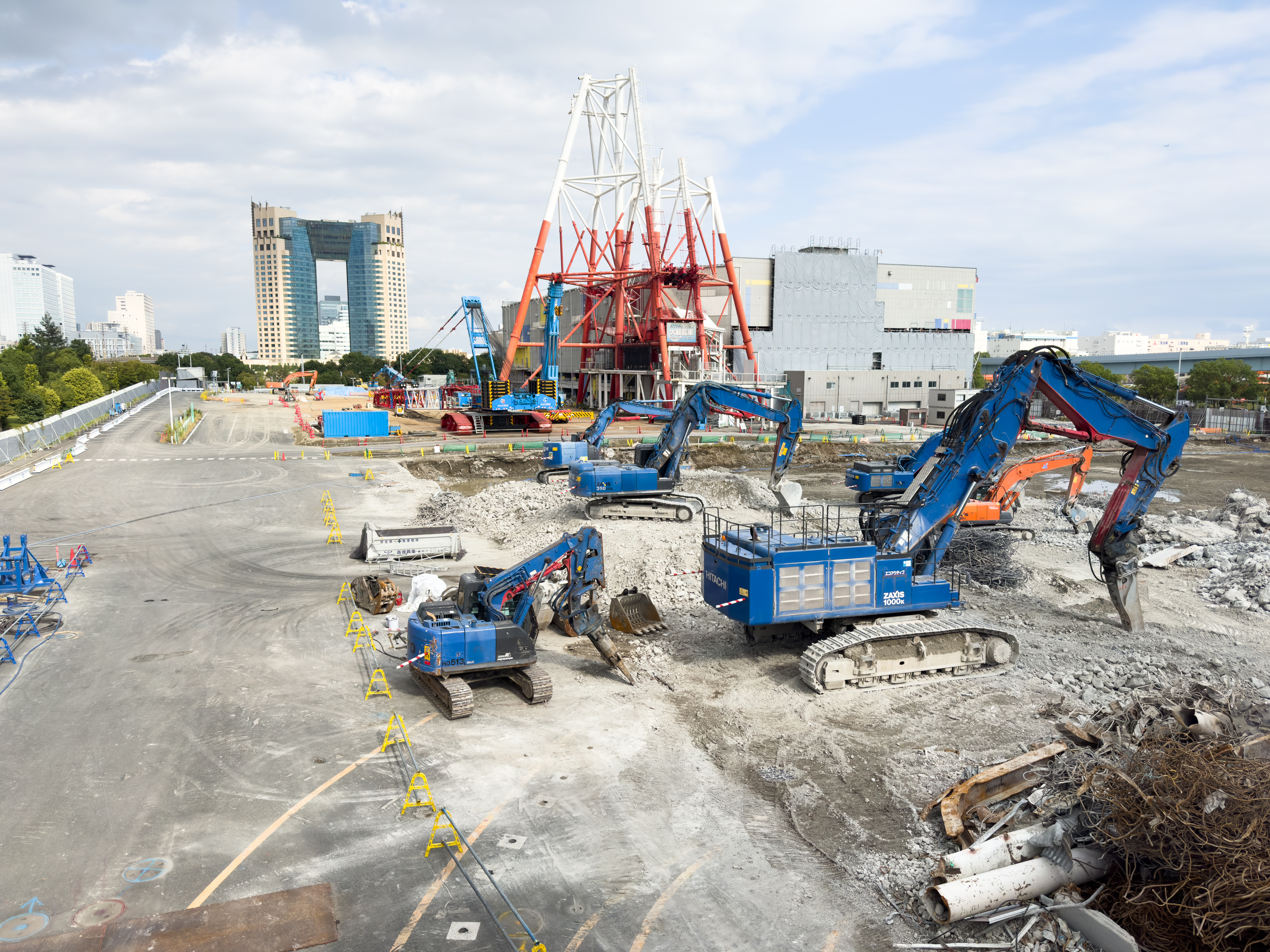
The Ferris wheel being dismantled

== Gallery ==
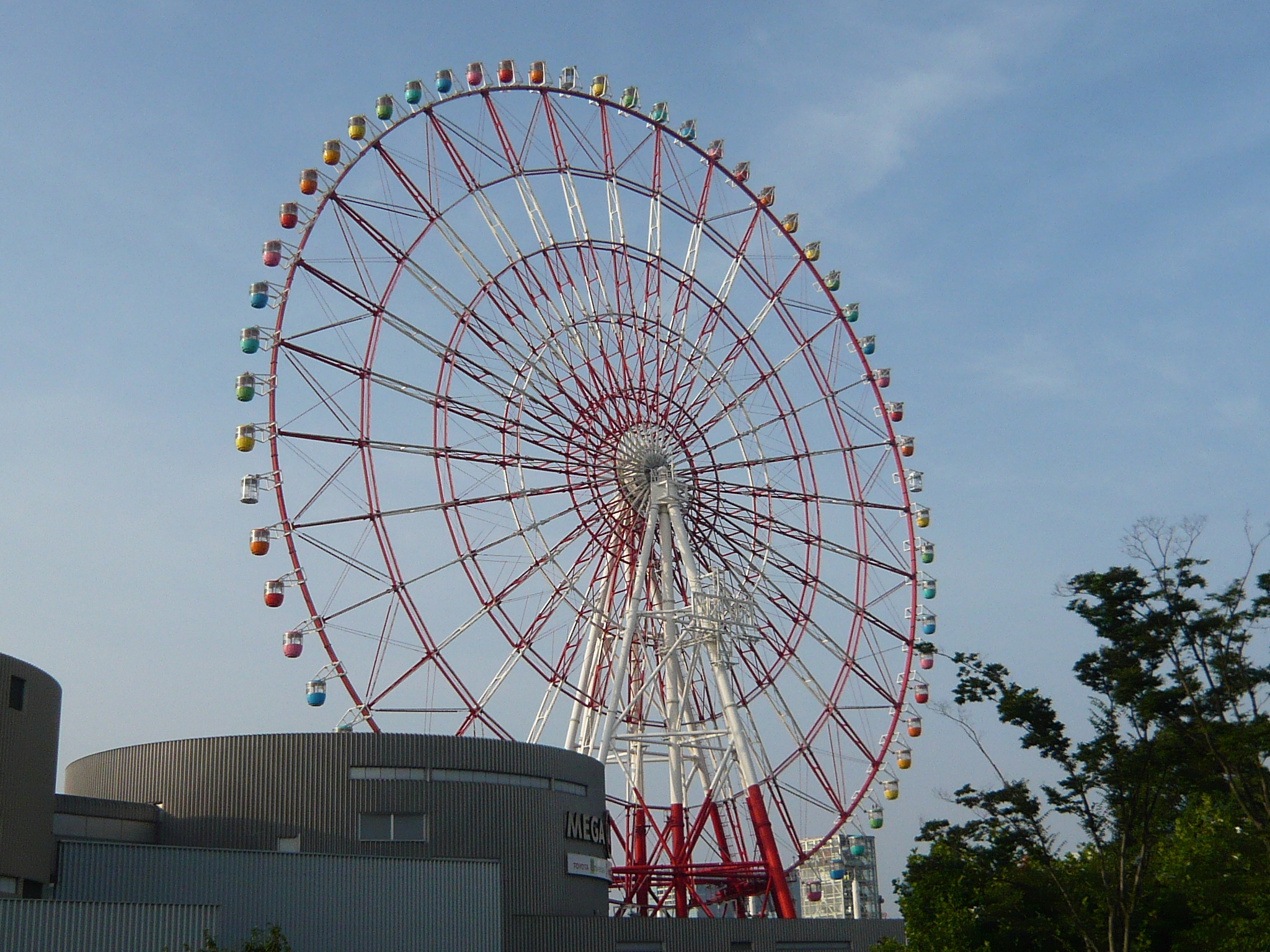
Daikanransha

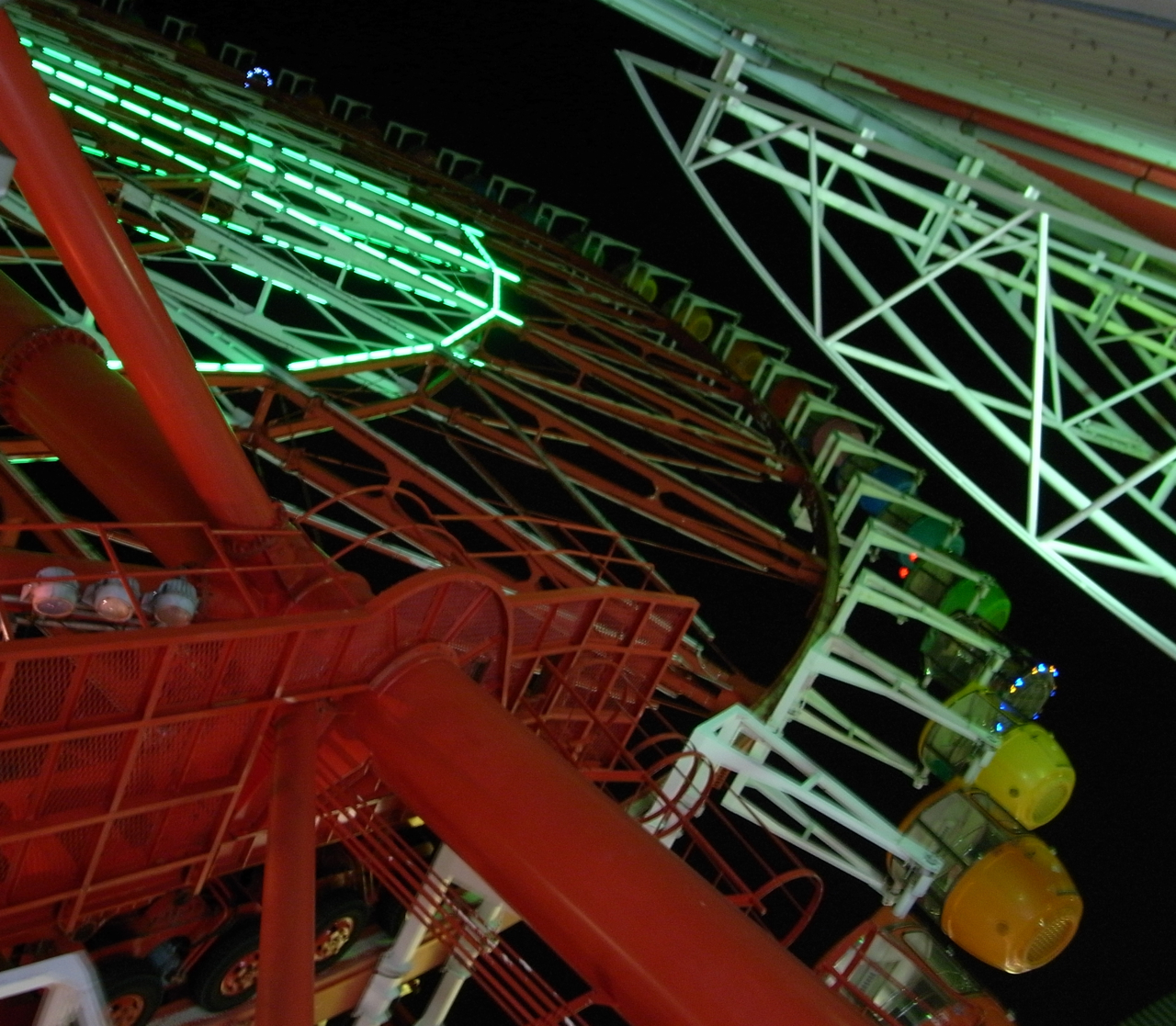

Daikanransha in 2020

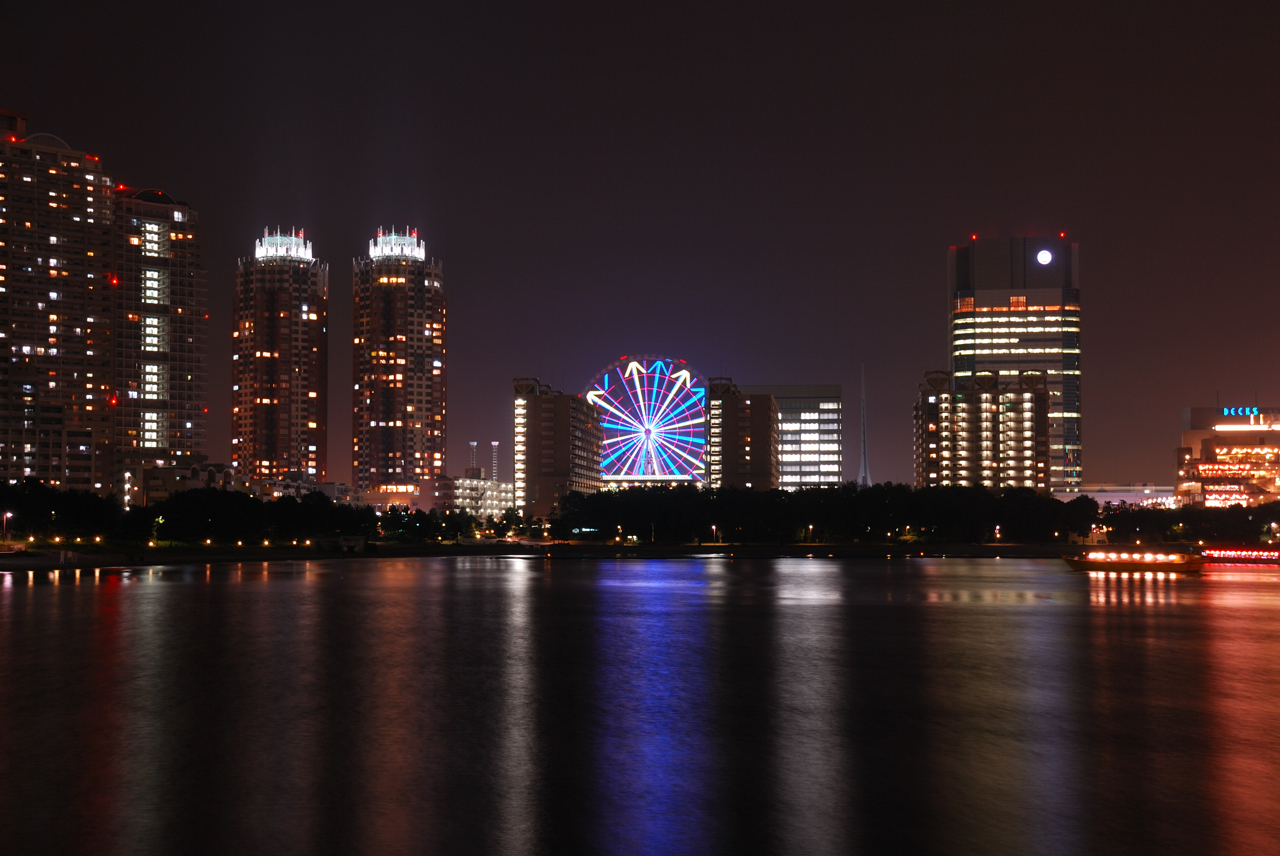
Odaiba skyline

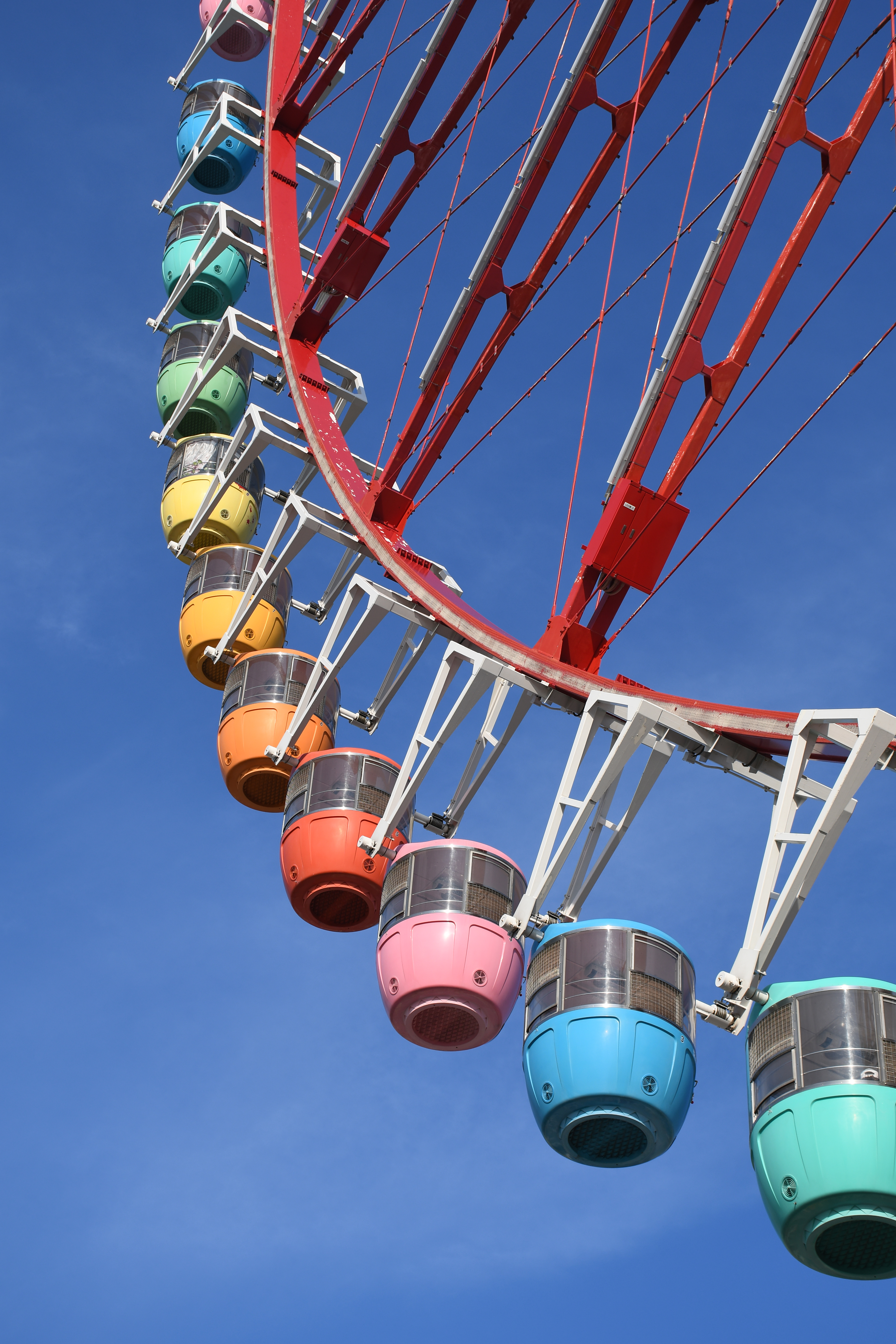
Structure and gondolas

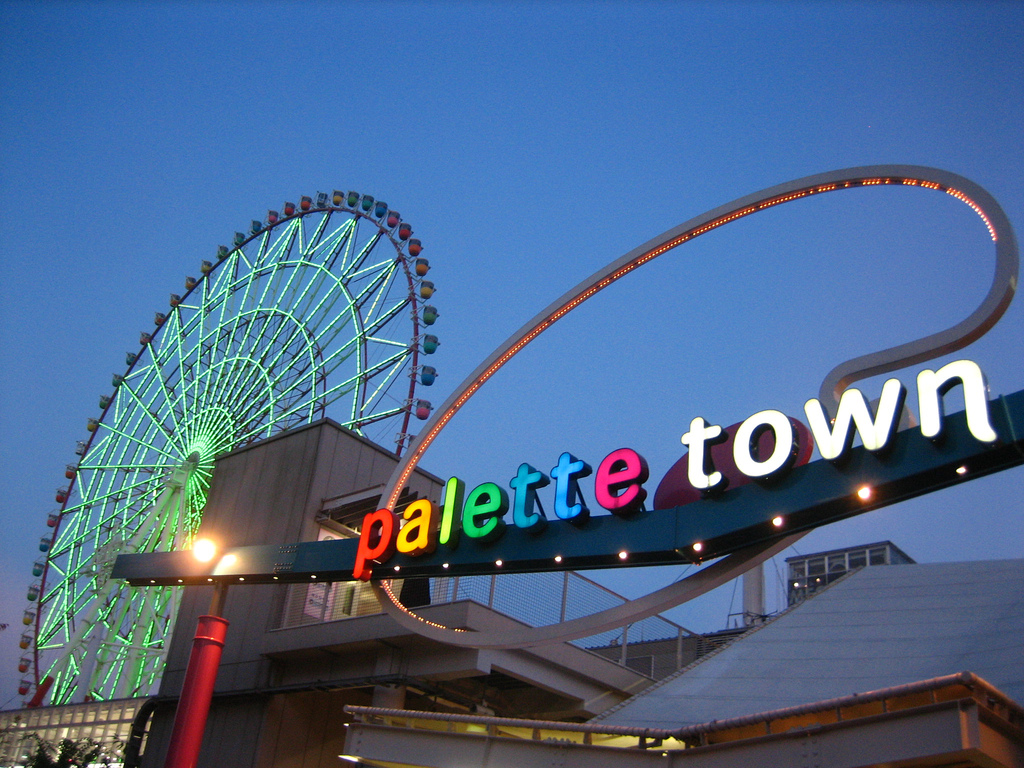
Palette Town entrance

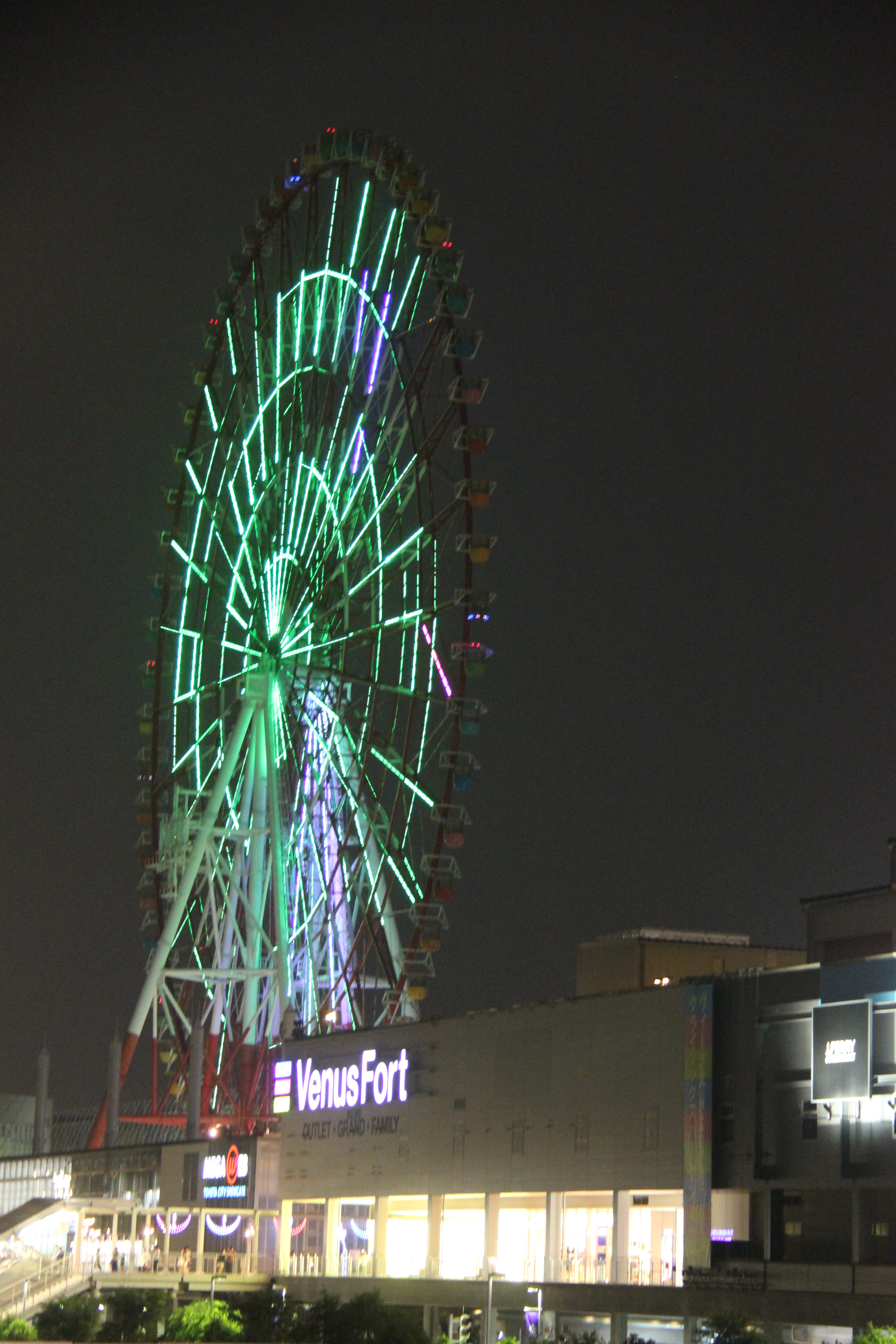

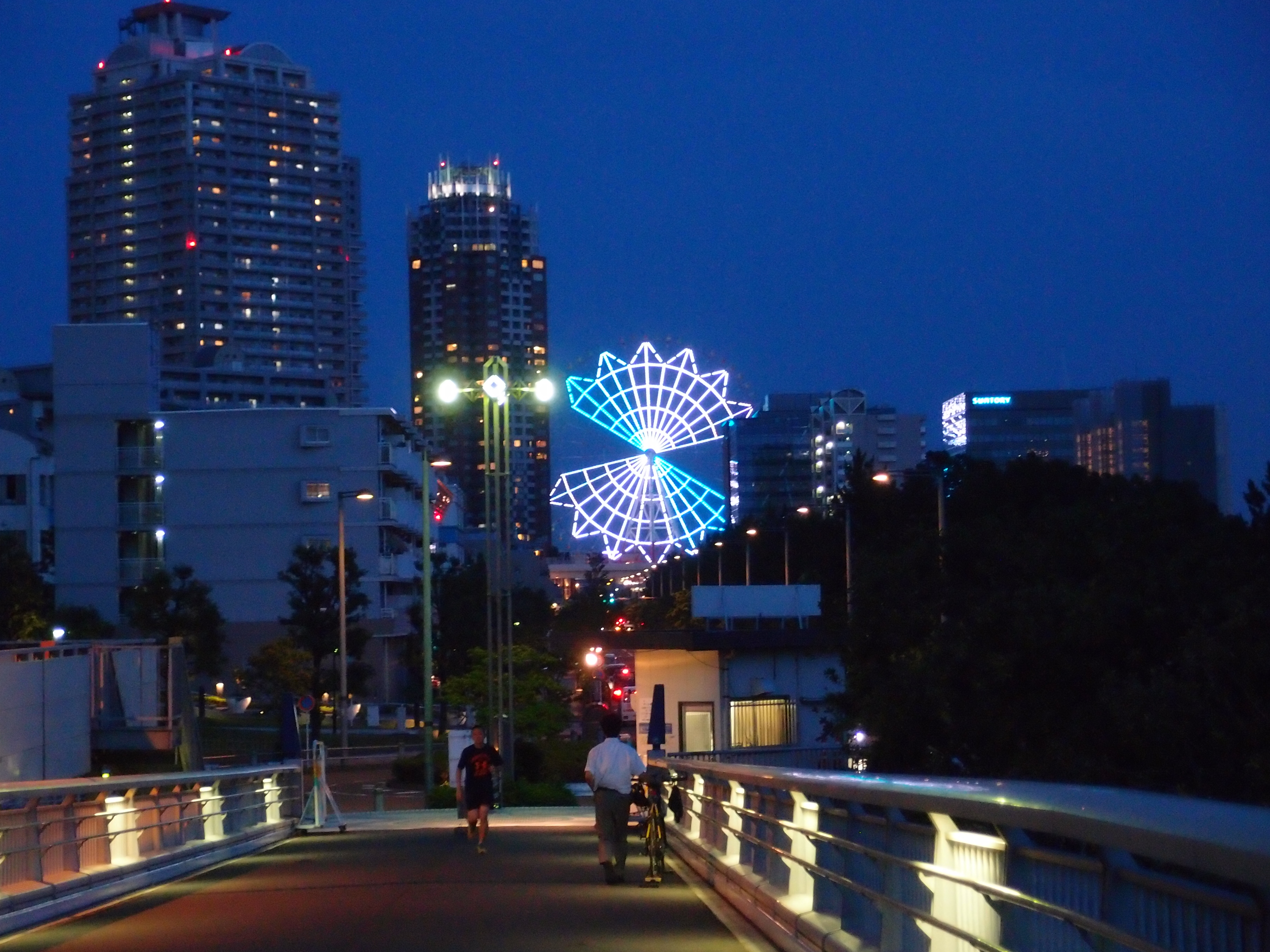

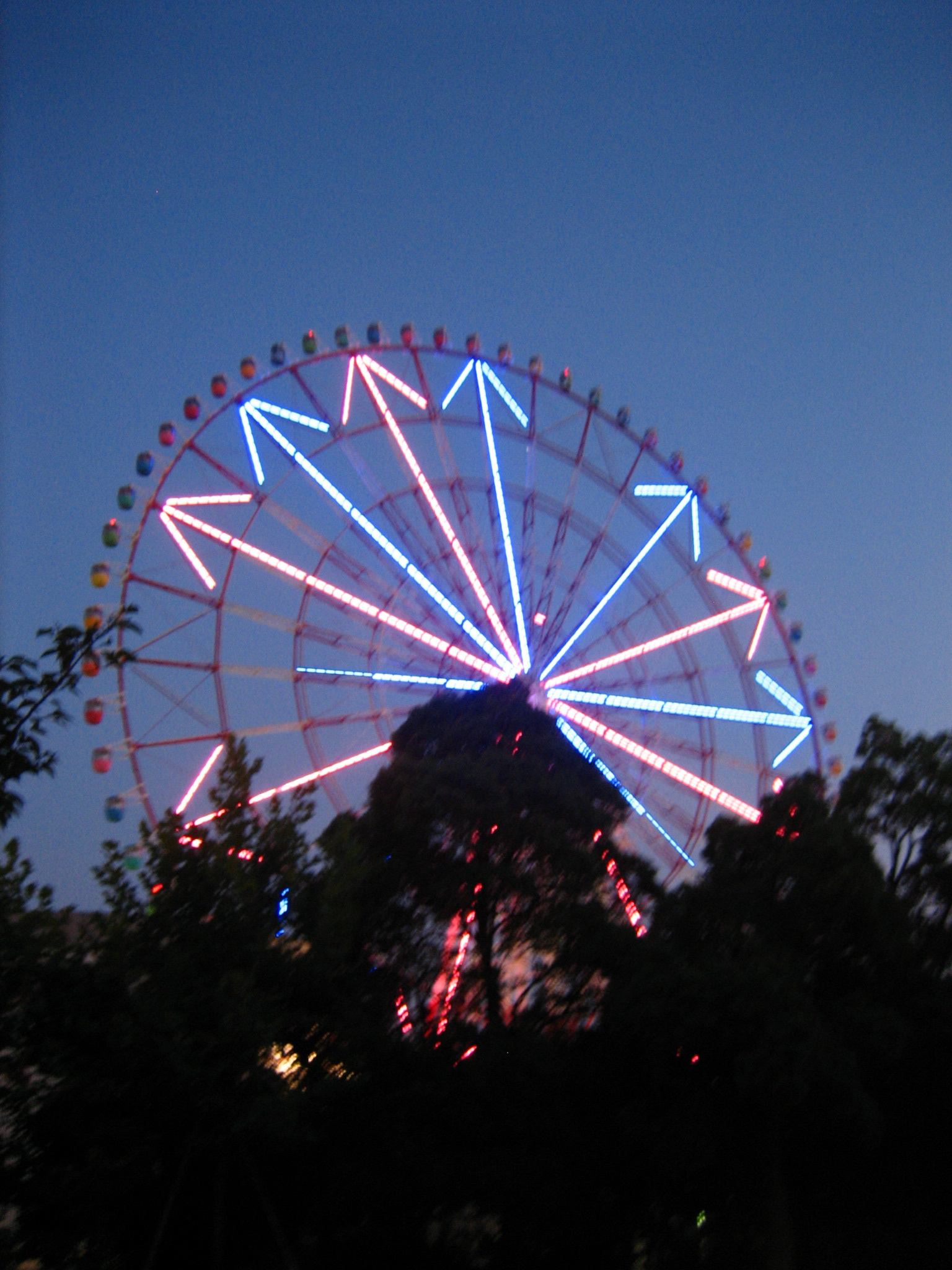

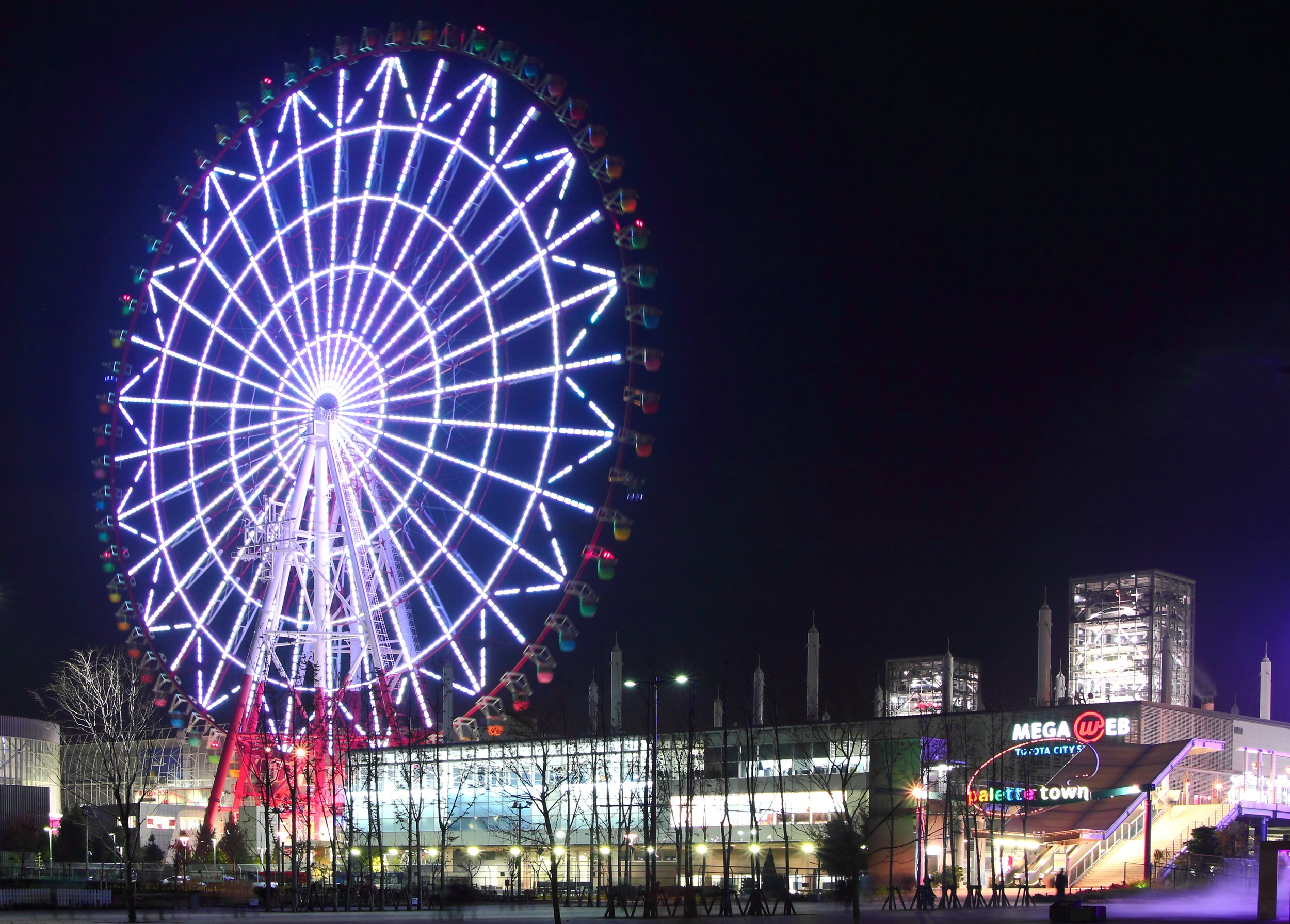
Palette Town

Preceded by Tempozan Ferris Wheel	World's tallest Ferris wheel 1999	Succeeded by London Eye
