= Kawachi Bay =

Historical landform in Osaka

Kawachi Bay (河内湾) was a bay that existed millennia ago in modern Osaka city and surrounds. On its eastern border were the Ikoma mountain range, and the west there was a peninsula where many (pre)historical settlements are found. Both the Yodo River on the northern periphery and the Yamato River on the southern end emptied into it. The alluvium deposits created a sandbar today known as Uemachi Plateau. Eventually the bay was cut off from the ocean by the growing sand peninsula, turning it into a lake called Kawachi Lake (河内湖). Continual deposition in time filled the lake turning it swampy; some centuries later it became an alluvial plain on which most of Osaka Prefecture sits.

The word Kawachi refers to Kawachi Province, which itself means inside the river.
