= Osaka Bay =

Bay in Western Japan

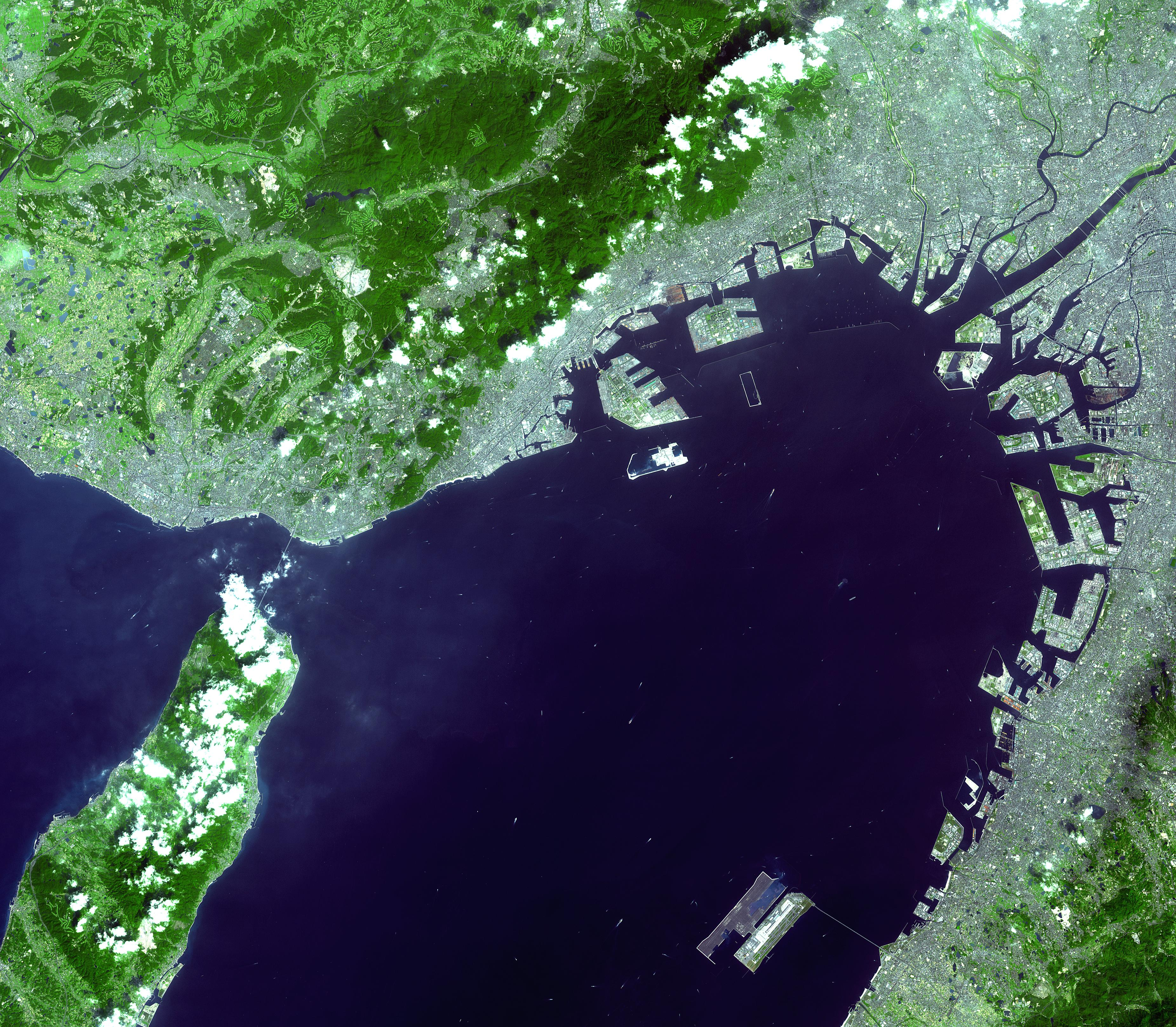
- Satellite photo of northern Osaka Bay

- Location in Japan Osaka Bay (Japan)
- Coordinates: 34°30′N 135°18′E
- Ocean/sea sources: Pacific Ocean
- Basin countries: Japan

Panoramic night view of urban area surrounding Osaka Bay

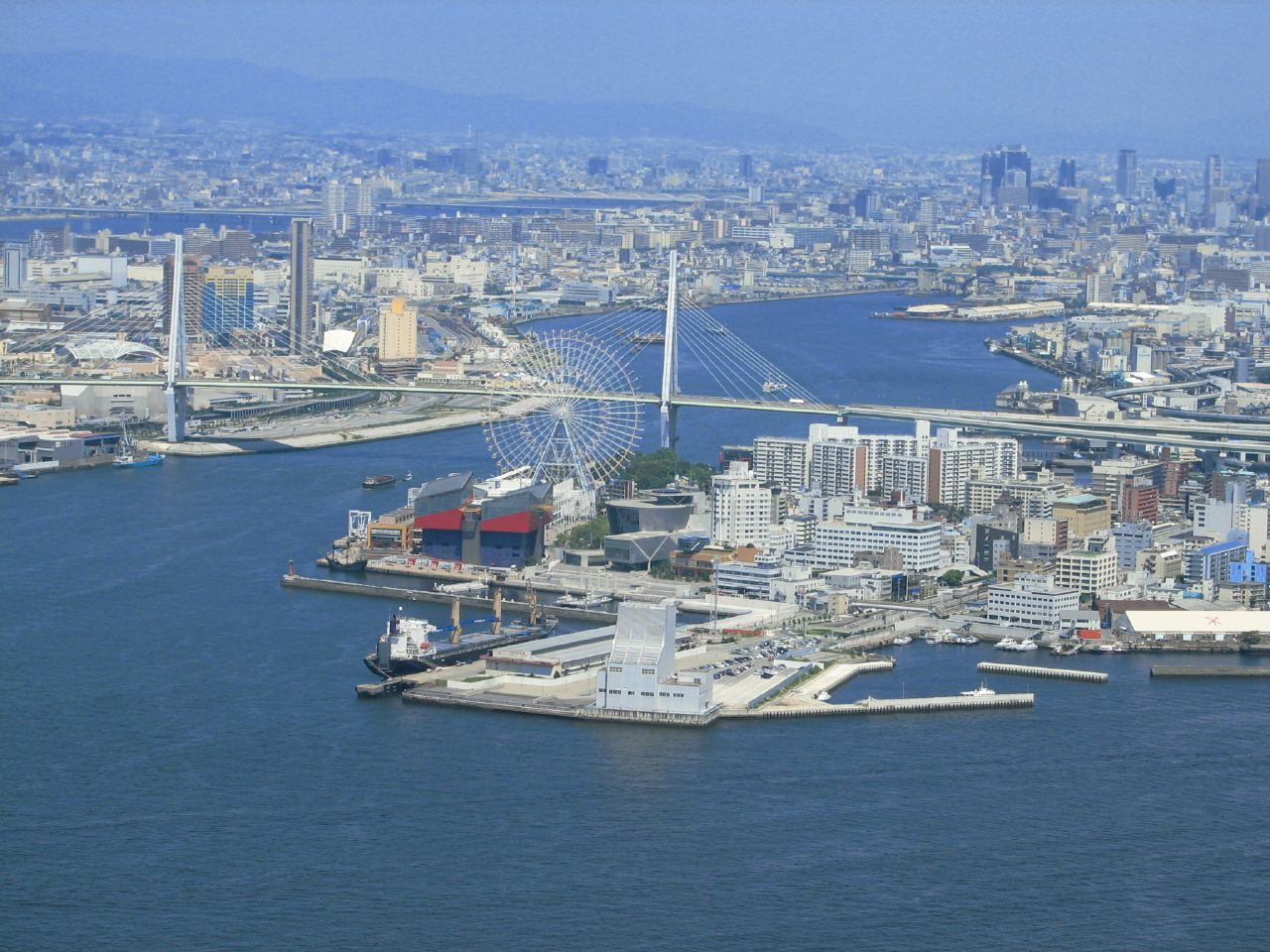
Port of Osaka

Osaka Bay (大阪湾 Ōsaka-wan Japanese: [oːsakaꜜwaɴ]) is an inland bay in western Japan, on the eastern side of the Seto Inland Sea. It is separated from the Pacific Ocean by the Kii Channel and from the neighbor western part of the Inland Sea by the Akashi Strait. Its western shore is formed by Awaji Island, and its northern and eastern shores are part of the Kansai metropolitan area.

Major ports on Osaka Bay include Osaka, Kobe, Nishinomiya, Sakai, Amagasaki, and Hannan.

A number of artificial islands have been created in Osaka Bay in past decades, including Kansai International Airport, Kobe Airport, Port Island, and Rokkō Island. In antiquity, Osaka Bay stretched almost to Kyoto, Naniwa, Osaka's oldest settlement, itself a peninsula in the bay.

Several islands at the south end of Osaka Bay are part of the Seto Inland Sea National Park.

Industries locate around Osaka Bay because there is a skilled and plentiful workforce, many port facilities, efficient linkages (from small to medium to large firms). There are good transport links (including the Shinkansen), room for expansion (land reclaimed from the sea), and a large local market (9 million).

In a recent economic change in Osaka Bay, older 'heavy' industries such as Nippon Steel have declined, and 'new tech' companies such as ICT have expanded. There has been a growth in the quaternary industries — research, development, and information. There has also been a development in the science parks and the building of new motorways; this has meant the loss of the countryside.

The Tempozan Ferris Wheel and Osaka Aquarium Kaiyukan are both located in the Tempozan Harbor Village area of Osaka.

== Major ports ==
- Port of Kobe
- Port of Osaka

== Airports ==
- Kansai International Airport
- Kobe Airport

== See also ==
- Seto Inland Sea
