= Kyoto Prefectural Yamashiro Regional Museum =

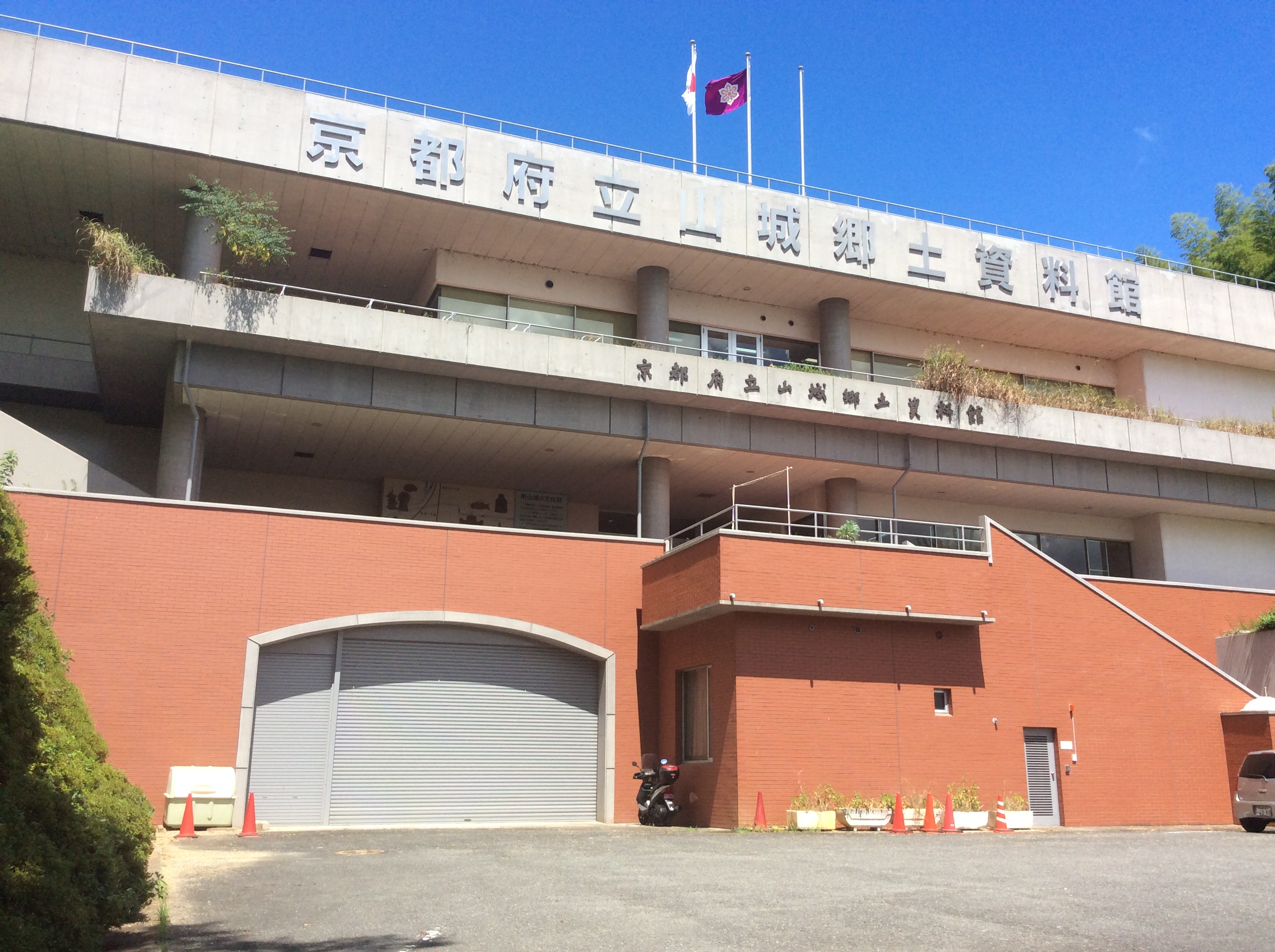

- Location of Kyoto Prefectural Yamashiro Regional Museum Kyoto Prefectural Yamashiro Regional Museum (Japan)
- Established: 1982
- Location: Senryoiwa, Kamikoma, Yamashiro district Kizugawa City, Kyoto Prefecture
- Coordinates: 34.752243°N 135.833888°E
- Type: regional museum
- Website: https://www.kyoto-be.ne.jp/yamasiro-m/

Kyoto Prefectural Yamashiro Regional Museum (京都府立山城郷土資料館) is a regional museum located in Yamashiro District of Kizugawa, Kyoto Prefecture, Japan. Its collections and exhibits cover archeological ruins as well as historical artifacts from south Yamashiro district of Kyoto Prefecture.

== Exhibition ==
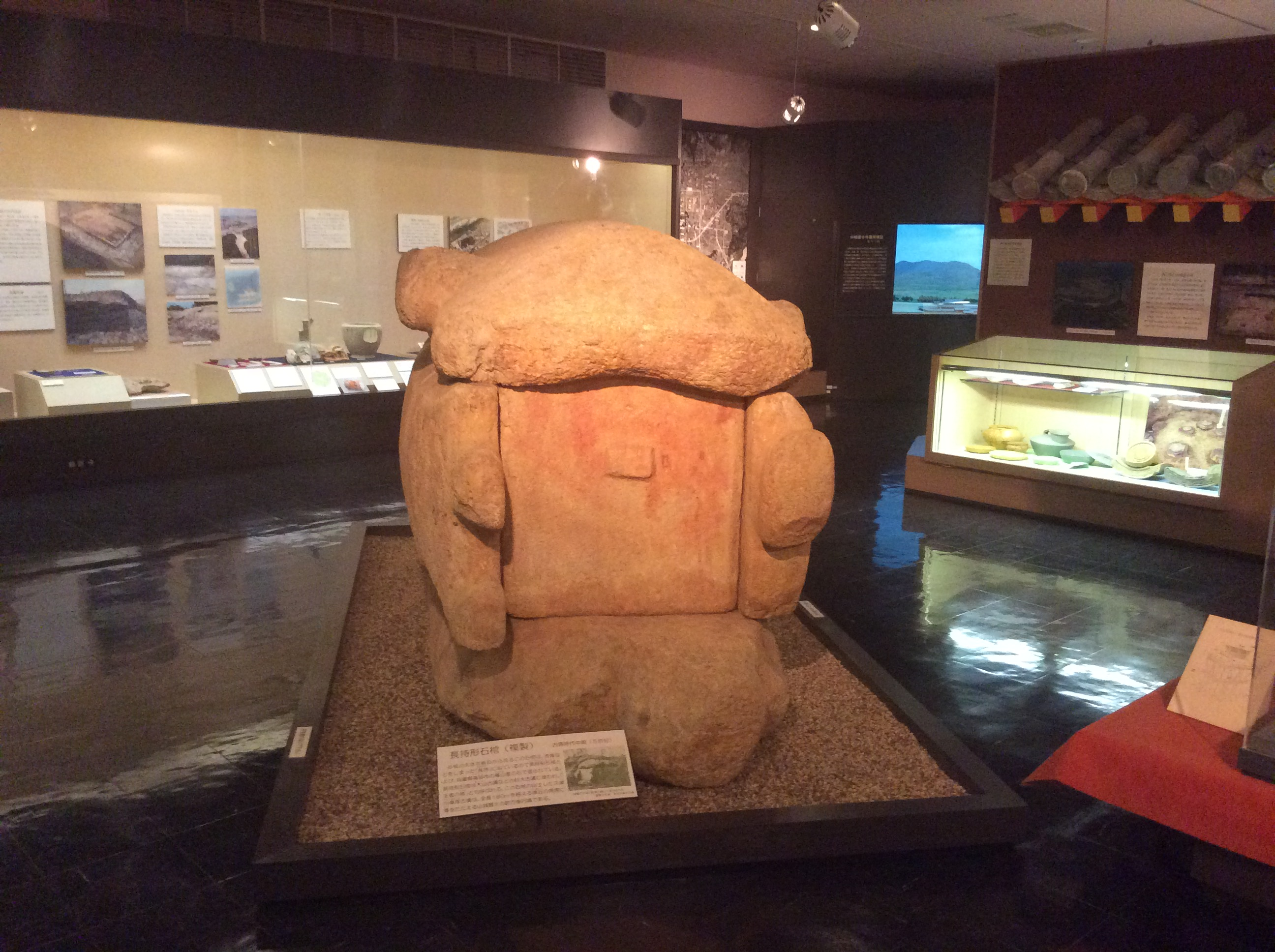
Interior view of the Museum. Showing stone coffin

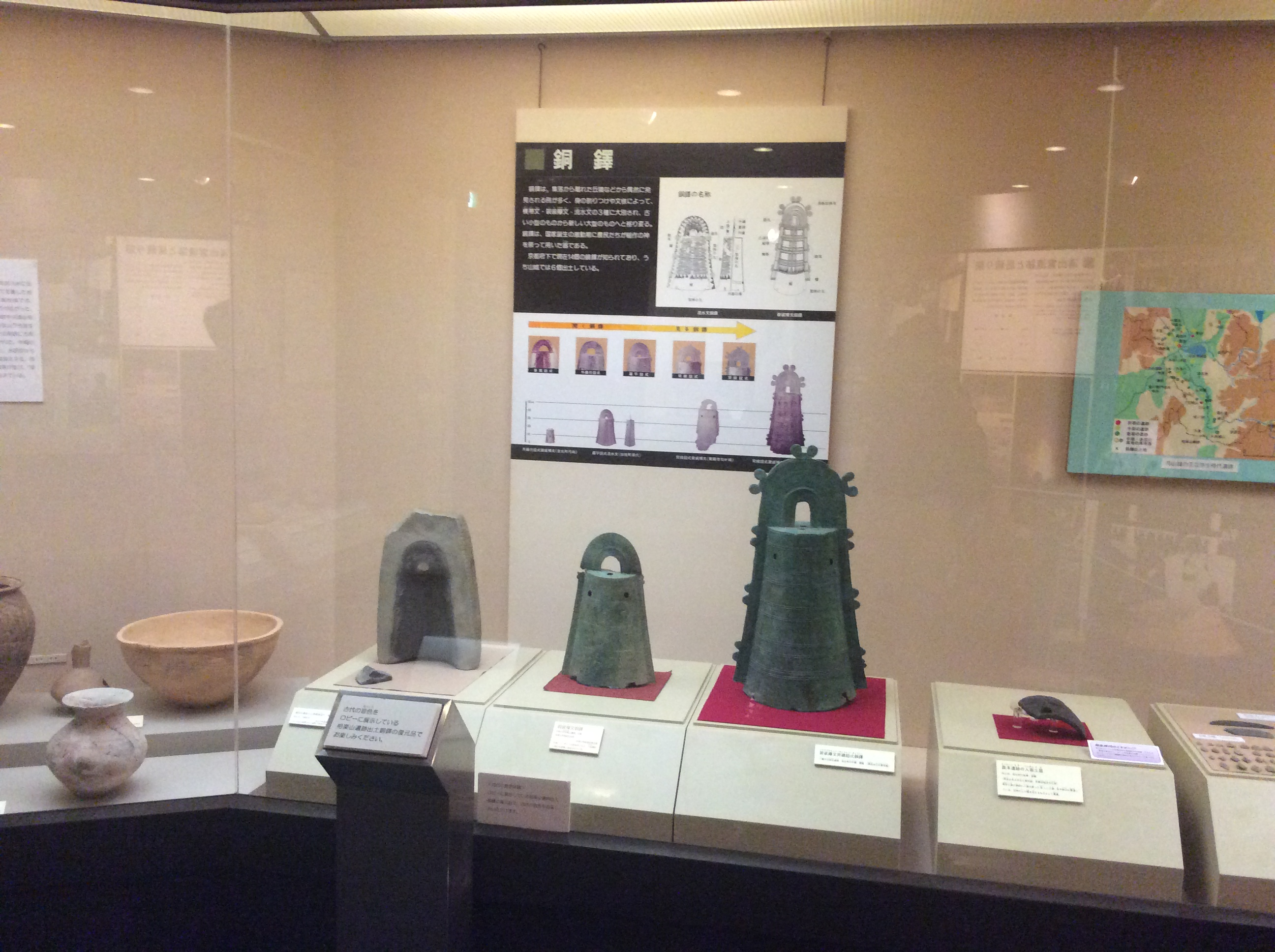
Interior view of the Museum. Showing Dotaku, bronze bells

=== Permanent Exhibition ===
Exhibits archeological ruins and historical artifacts from south Yamashiro districts. Major exhibitions are Kesadasukimon Dōtaku (ritual bronze bell with crossed band design), roofing tile from Imperial Audience Hall of Kuni-kyō, cray face, statue of Gozo Tenno, Standing Statue of Amida Nyorai, white and black face masks.

=== Special Exhibition ===
==== 2018 ====
- Akira Akitsuki, A painter walked with Buddha
- Opening of rail road and modern development of South Yamashiro area
- Excavated history of Kyoto, 2018
- Whispers of letters - Writings on excavated articles
- Tools for daily life - now and then

== Activities ==
=== Visitor Participation ===
Children activity "Let's make a Dotaku-shaped Lampshade", "Let's make bronze mirror", "Let's make Wadōkaichin, Bronze Coin".

=== Seminars ===
Various seminars on history in the area. Example includes "Walking through history - walking along Daibutsu Tetsudo".

=== Lectures ===
Lectures held be museum staffs or invited lecturers on topic of history.

== Access ==
About a 20–25 minute walk from Kamikoma Station of JR Nara Line.

== Open hour and date ==
Open 9:00 - 16:30.

Closed on Monday (except on holidays, in which case it is closed on Tuesday) and at the end and beginning of the year.
