= Shogo Imamura =

Japanese writer (born 1984)

- 今村翔吾
- Born: June 18, 1984 (age 42); Kamo, Kyoto, Japan
- Occupation: Writer
- Relatives: Katsuhiko Imamura (father)
- Writing career
- Language: Japanese
- Years active: 2016–present
- Genre: Historical fiction
- Notable works: Last Samurai Standing; Kangibanka; Saiō no Tate
- Notable awards: 166th Naoki Prize
- Website: www.zusyu.co.jp

Shogo Imamura (Japanese: 今村翔吾, Hepburn: Imamura Shōgo; born June 18, 1984) is a Japanese writer. He is best known for writing historical fiction novels. He won the 166th Naoki Prize in 2022.

== Early life ==
Imamura was born in Kamo, Kyoto (now Kizugawa) on June 18, 1984. His father, Katsuhiko Imamura, is a former elementary school teacher. He graduated from Nara Women's University Secondary School and Kansai University's Faculty of Letters. Upon graduation, he worked as a dance instructor and an archeologist at the Moriyama Buried Cultural Properties Center.

== Career ==
While in fifth grade, Imamura read Sanada Taiheiki by Shōtarō Ikenami, which lead him to consider pursuing a career as a writer. After going through health issues in 2013 and 2014, he decided to start writing in his spare time. In 2016, Imamura won the Izu Literary Award Grand Prize for Kire, Hikogoro. Later that year, Imamura won the Kyushu Saga Popular Literature Award for Kitsune no Shiro. Kenzo Kitakata, who was on the selection committee for the award, recommended to an editor at Shodensha to publish a work by Imamura. Shodensha published Hikuidori: Ushūboro Tobigumi in 2017, which was Imamura's first published work.

In February 2018, Imamura quit his job at the Moriyama Buried Cultural Properties Center to pursue writing full time. His work Warabe no Kami was nominated for the 160th Naoki Prize in 2019. He was nominated for the 163rd Naoki Prize in 2020 for Jinkan. He won the 166th Naoki Prize in 2022 for Saiō no Tate. Later that year, he started screenwriting with Saturday wa Nanisuru!?, a Japanese television drama. He began appearing on the radio show Imamura Shōgo × Yamazaki Reina no Itotteseshete in September 2022 with former Nogizaka46 member Rena Yamazaki. In 2023, Imamura founded Hon Mirai, an organization to promote young writers.

In 2022, his novel Last Samurai Standing was adapted into a manga illustrated by Katsumi Tatsuzawa. It was serialized in Kodansha's seinen manga magazine Morning beginning in December 2022, with its chapters collected in six tankōbon volumes as of November 2025. In 2025, it was made into a live-action TV series of the same name. The series was released in November 2025 on Netflix.

== Personal life ==
Imamura resides in Ōtsu, Shiga, Japan.

In 2021, Imamura purchased Kinoshita Book Center, a struggling bookstore in Minoh, Osaka. After undergoing renovations, it was reopened on November 1, 2021. Imamura opened Saga no Shoten, a bookstore in the Saga Station, in December 2023.

== Bibliography ==
Imamura's works generally fall into the historical fiction genre. Imamura described his style of writing as "writing without a plot" and only a desired ending for the story in mind. Imamura has cited the works of Shōtarō Ikenami and Ryōtarō Shiba as influences on his work.

=== Ushūboro Tobigumi series ===
- Hikuidori (火喰鳥), Shodensha, 2017, ISBN 9784396342982
- Yoru Karasu (夜哭烏), Shodensha, 2017, ISBN 9784396343378
- Kumonryū (九紋龍), Shodensha, 2017, ISBN 9784396343750
- Oni Kiseru (鬼煙管), Shodensha, 2018, ISBN 9784396343972
- Bosatsubana (菩薩花), Shodensha, 2018, ISBN 9784396344238
- Yume Kochō (夢胡蝶), Shodensha, 2018, ISBN 9784396344481
- Kitsune Hanabi (狐花火), Shodensha, 2018, ISBN 9784396344757
- Gyokkirin (玉麒麟), Shodensha, 2019, ISBN 9784396345044
- Sōfūjin (双風神), Shodensha, 2019, ISBN 9784396345464
- Kogane Hina (黄金雛), Shodensha, 2019, ISBN 9784396345808
- Kasane Taihō (Ue) (襲大鳳（上）), Shodensha, 2020, ISBN 9784396345945
- Kasane Taihō (Shita) (襲大鳳（下）), Shodensha, 2020, ISBN 9784396346232
- Koi Orochi (恋大蛇), Shodensha, 2022, ISBN 9784396343378

=== Kuramashi ya Kagyō series ===
- Kuramashi ya Kagyō (くらまし屋稼業), Kadokawa Haruki Office, 2018, ISBN 9784758441803
- Haru wa Made ka (春はまだか), Kadokawa Haruki Office, 2018, ISBN 9784758441896
- Natsu no Modori-sen (夏の戻り船), Kadokawa Haruki Office, 2018, ISBN 9784758442183
- Aki Kure no Go Ri (秋暮の五人), Kadokawa Haruki Office, 2019, ISBN 9784758442473
- Fuyu Hare no Hanayome (冬晴れの花嫁), Kadokawa Haruki Office, 2019, ISBN 9784758442800
- Hanauta no Koro e (花唄の頃へ), Kadokawa Haruki Office, 2020, ISBN 9784758443197
- Tatsutori no Mai (立つ鳥の舞), Kadokawa Haruki Office, 2021, ISBN 9784758443654
- Kazemachi no Shi Suguru (風待ちの四傑), Kadokawa Haruki Office, 2022, ISBN 9784758444804

=== Ikusagami series ===
- Ikusagami Ten (イクサガミ 天), Kodansha, 2022, ISBN 9784065269862
- Ikusagami Chi (イクサガミ 地), Kodansha, 2023, ISBN 9784065280126

=== Other works ===
- Warabe no Kami (童の神), Kadokawa Haruki Office, 2018, ISBN 9784758413299
- Hyakka! Zenkoku Kōkōsei Hana Ike Batoru (ひゃっか! 全国高校生花いけバトル), Bunkyosha, 2018, ISBN 9784866510965
- Teracoya Ao Gidō Shishō, Hashiru (てらこや青義堂 師匠、走る), Shogakukan, 2019, ISBN 9784093865364
- Hachi Pon Me no Yari (八本目の槍), Shinchosha, 2019, ISBN 9784103527114
- Jinkan (じんかん), Kodansha, 2020, ISBN 9784065192702
- Saiō no Tate (塞王の楯), Shueisha, 2021, ISBN 9784087717310
- Yukimura o Ute (幸村を討て), Chuokoron-Shinsha, 2022, ISBN 9784120055157

=== Manga ===
- Warabe no Kami (2020–2022) (illustrated by Yō Fukaya; serialized in Monthly Action)
- Kangibanka (2020–2021) (illustrated by Kōji Megumi; serialized in Weekly Shōnen Magazine)
- Kuramashi ya Kagyō (2021–present) (illustrated by Yudai; serialized on ComicWalker)
- Last Samurai Standing (2022–present) (illustrated by Katsumi Tatsuzawa; serialized in Morning)
- Hikuidori (2025–present) (illustrated by Shinobu Seguchi; serialized in Weekly Shōnen Champion)
