= Kizu, Kyoto =

Dissolved municipality in Kyoto prefecture, Japan

Kizu (木津町, Kizu-chō) is a district of the city of Kizugawa, Kyoto Prefecture, Japan. It was a town in its own right in Sōraku District until 2007. Kizu and the towns of Kamo and Yamashiro (all from Sōraku District) merged to create the city of Kizugawa on March 12, 2007.

As of 2003, the town had an estimated population of 36,070 and a density of 1,527.10 persons per km^{2}. The total area was 23.62 km^{2}.
