= Kodoku =

Type of poisonous magic found in Japanese folklore

Kodoku (蠱毒, 'curse poison'), also called kodō (蠱道, 'curse method'), kojutsu (蠱術, 'curse technique') and fuko (巫蠱, 'sorcery curse'), is a type of poisonous magic found in Japanese folklore. It is the Japanese derivative of the Chinese gu magic.

It is said to have been widely used in ancient China. It is not clear for how long it has been used, but scholars of Chinese characters such as Shizuka Shirakawa, who advocates the importance of magic in ancient times, have found traces of poison in the oracle bone script of the Yin and Zhou dynasties. The earliest record of worms is in the Geography of the Suishu, which reads:

On May 5th, 100 species of insects were collected, the larger ones were snakes, the smaller ones were lice. Place them inside, let them eat each other, and keep what is left of the last species. If it is a snake, it is a serpent, if it is a louse, it is a louse. Do this and kill a person.

To create kodoku, sorcerers would mix several insects in a jar, and let them kill one another until only one survived. The fluids of the insect that survived would be used to poison an individual with a curse that would control them, cause them misfortune, or kill them. The remaining insect could also be used as a sort of "luck charm" granting the one who performed the ritual great wealth. In return the owner is supposed to feed the bug. Neglecting to do so would enrage the insect, if the owner does not equivalently repay the insect by placing all their riches beside a road, plus interest in gold and silver, the insect would devour the home owner. Therefore, this ritual could also be used as a death curse by giving the riches to an ignorant individual. The term kodoku can also be applied to the spirit which is the incarnation of this particular magic (which usually appears in the shape of a worm or other animal).

The technique was used in the Nara period.

== In fiction ==
- The technique plays an important role in the first part of the 1985 historical fantasy novel Teito Monogatari. The protagonist Yasunori Katō is a master of kodoku magic and uses it to manipulate his victims. The spirit is represented as an insectoid worm (腹中虫, fukuchu-mushi) which lives in the stomach of the victim.
- The term "spiritual kodoku" is used in the anime Ghost Hunt for a curse technique in which spirits are trapped like insects are in traditional kodoku practice. A dominant spirit devours the weaker spirits until it has enough power to kill the target of the curse. The only way to stop the curse is to "feed" the spirit as compensation.
- In InuYasha the main antagonist Naraku creates a kodoku inside a mountain to gather and merge hundreds of yōkai to form a new body for himself.
- Kodoku Experiment is a science fiction manga from Yukinobu Hoshino where a kodoku is being created on a planet filled with ferocious monsters.
- Kodoku is used in the anime Fushigi Yûgi (Episode 18) as a drug to change the personality of one of the major protagonists, Tamahome.
- The Kagewani from the anime of the same name is a shadow creature that was created through kodoku using several different animals instead of insects.
- In Ōsama Game: Kigen, a manga prequel of Ōsama Game, the culprit behind a murderous game is subsequently revealed to be a virus, created through kodoku by Natsuko Honda's ancestors.
- The idea of Kodoku is a central motif to the plot of the manga BIOHAZARD Heavenly Island, where it is used by the main antagonists to develop a new B.O.W.
- In the web novel Re:Monster, Kodoku is used by the main protagonist as a method to create a more powerful army, from pitching many different summoned creatures against each other inside a hole, and letting them "evolve" by themselves.
- In Mob Psycho 100, one of the minor antagonists, Matsuo, uses Kodoku to merge evil spirits to create powerful "pets".
- Hunter x Hunter succession arc is based on this ceremony.
- The Ao No Haha manga is entirely based upon the Kodoku Magic, there it is used to make stronger medicine by using a different "pot".
- Kotoribako and Ryoumen Sukuna (elements of Japanese folklore and Kowabana, Japanese scary stories usually spread by rumors and forums) may have been created by using some variant of the Kodoku Magic.
- In Dokumushi the main characters are forced to participate in a human kodoku ritual: they are told the only ones who survive will be by killing and eating the other participants, and that the last survivor will be freed.
- In Blue Lock the titular Blue Lock is a prison-like facility where three hundred talented high school soccer players from all over Japan are forced to participate in a soccer kodoku, the overall winner who is explicitly called the "sole survivor" will earn the right to become the national team's striker and those who lose will be banned from joining the team forever.
- In Dark Gathering one of the main characters forces captured spirits in a kodoku in order to create powerful spirits.
- In Jujutsu Kaisen a kodoku-inspired ritual is traditionally used for making cursed tools; this requires soaking them in a solution of cursed energy formed from crushing and straining venomous creatures. Something similar can be done with cursed spirits, with significantly more difficulty.
- The Japanese visual kei band Kiryū has a music video named Kodoku which describes the practice of inflicting curses through poisoning.
- In volume 10 of the light novel series Reign of the Seven Spellblades, Tim Linton describes his childhood in terms of the "bug urn" used to produce poisons in the faraway land of "Chena", which he calls "halfway to a full-on curse". The Linton clan's magical tradition is to collect magically talented orphans, poison them, and force-feed the ones who died to the survivors, repeating the process until only one strong, poison-themed mage child is left, whom they raise as their heir.
- In the manga and anime series Kengan Ashura, Kodoku magic is referenced and explained to describe the origin story of the character Agito Kanoh (also referred to as the Fang of Metsudo), who similarly gained his ferocity and instincts from being subjected to a human version of Kodoku by the character referred to as "The Other Tokita Niko". In the Anime, this backstory is showcased in Episode 49 "Giant Star".
- In the manga Kagurabachi, the Master Swordsman (剣聖, Kensei) Akemura Soga uses an ability named Malediction (蠱, Kodoku) - which manifests as a field of pale flowers and dark insects - to eradicate the population of a small island.
- The concept of the Kodoku is central to the historical fiction drama Last Samurai Standing, set in the middle of the Meiji period, wherein a collection of 292 fighters, primarily fallen samurai, are set against each other. The first episode of the 2025 TV series is even called 'Kodoku', as is the tournament itself, and the concept is spoken of often throughout the show.
- In Volume 43 of the light novel series Re:Zero, the shinobi Yae Tenzen is revealed to have been put through a kodoku ritual, which consisted of a deathmatch between her and thirty other genin, by her adoptive father and his allies, who intended to transform her into their idealized image of a shinobi.
- Momoyo Himemushi from Touhou Project uses spell cards that refer to the Kudoku process. As she is a centipede who is based on The Tale of Tawara Toda, many of her attacks utilize names and patterns of insects and other mythological creatures being devoured.

== See also ==
- Kōshin belief
- Single-elimination tournament
