= Ushūboro Tobigumi =

Japanese novel series

- First novel volume cover

羽州ぼろ鳶組
- Genre: Historical
- Novel series
- Written by: Shogo Imamura
- Published by: Shodensha
- Imprint: Shodensha Bunko
- Original run: March 13, 2017 – present
- Volumes: 12 + 1 short story
- Manga

Hikuidori
- Written by: Shogo Imamura
- Illustrated by: Shinobu Seguchi
- Published by: Akita Shoten
- Imprint: Shōnen Champion Comics
- Magazine: Weekly Shōnen Champion
- Original run: April 24, 2025 – present
- Volumes: 6
- Anime television series

Oedo Fire Slayer: The Legend of Phoenix
- Directed by: Hajime Kamegaki (Note: Head director (監督の御頭).); Yasuhiro Higuchi (Note: Credited under the penname Hiroshi Yasumi (八隅宏).)
- Written by: Ryūsuke Mori; Shōhei Fukuda; Yoriko Tomita; Kōhei Nishimura
- Music by: Yasuharu Takanashi
- Studio: SynergySP
- Licensed by: Crunchyroll: SEA: Medialink
- Original network: JNN (CBC, TBS), AT-X
- Original run: January 11, 2026 – April 5, 2026
- Episodes: 12
- icon

Ushūboro Tobigumi (羽州ぼろ鳶組) is a Japanese novel series written by Shogo Imamura. It began publication under Shodensha's Shodensha Bunko imprint in March 2017. Twelve volumes and a short story collection have been published as of March 2022. A manga adaptation of the first novel illustrated by Shinobu Seguchi began serialization in Akita Shoten's shōnen manga magazine Weekly Shōnen Champion in April 2025. An anime television series adaptation of the first novel produced by SynergySP aired from January to April 2026.

== Plot ==
Set in the late Edo period, the story centers on the Boro Tobi-gumi, a firefighting brigade operating in the Ushū region. The story follows Matsunaga Gengo, once the best fire-fighting samurai in Edo, who joins the brigade at the encouragement of his wife Miyuki. Looked down on by other groups, the brigade is composed largely of social outcasts and drifters, bound together by their dangerous work and shared sense of duty. Known as "Hikuidori" (Fire-Eating Birds), the members risk their lives battling massive fires that threaten towns and livelihoods in an era when fire is one of the greatest dangers to daily life.

== Characters ==
Gengo Matsunaga (松永源吾, Matsunaga Gengo)
Voiced by: Yūichirō Umehara
Shinnosuke Torigoe (鳥越新之助, Torigoe Shinnosuke)
Voiced by: Shūichirō Umeda
Torajiro (寅次郎, Torajirō)
Voiced by: Subaru Kimura
Hikoya (彦弥)
Voiced by: Nobunaga Shimazaki
Seijuro Kaji (加持星十郎, Kaji Seijurō)
Voiced by: Kensho Ono
Jinsuke (甚助)
Voiced by: Kent Itō
Rokuemon Hōjō (北条 六右衛門, Hōjō Rokuemon)
Voiced by: Naoya Uchida
Samon Orishimo (折下 左門, Orishimo Samon)
Voiced by: Kōji Yusa
Renji (漣次)
Voiced by: Yasuaki Takumi
Kingorō (金五郎)
Voiced by: Shinpachi Tsuji
Akiyo (秋代)
Voiced by: Aya Hisakawa
Moriemon Dategasaki (達ヶ関森右エ門, Dategasaki Moriemon)
Voiced by: Shinnosuke Ogami
Osuzu (お鈴)
Voiced by: Kana Ichinose
Heizō Nobuo Hasegawa (⻑谷川 平蔵 宜雄, Hasegawa Heizō Nobuo)
Voiced by: Tetsuo Komura
Tōgorō (藤五郎)
Voiced by: Shin-ichiro Miki
Miyuki (深雪)
Voiced by: Ayaka Miyoshi
Kankurō Ōto (大音 勘九郎, Ōto Kankurō)
Voiced by: Junichi Suwabe

== Media ==
=== Novel ===
| No. | Title | Release date | ISBN |
|---|---|---|---|
| 1 | Hikuidori (火喰鳥) | March 13, 2017 | 978-4-396-34298-2 |
| 2 | Yakokugarasu (夜哭烏) | July 10, 2017 | 978-4-396-34337-8 |
| 3 | Kumonryū (九紋龍) | November 13, 2017 | 978-4-396-34375-0 |
| 4 | Onikiseru (鬼煙管) | February 13, 2018 | 978-4-396-34397-2 |
| 5 | Bosatsuka (菩薩花) | May 9, 2018 | 978-4-396-34423-8 |
| 6 | Yumekochō (夢胡蝶) | August 7, 2018 | 978-4-396-34448-1 |
| 7 | Kitsunehanabi (狐花火) | November 12, 2018 | 978-4-396-34475-7 |
| 8 | Gyokukirin (玉麒麟) | March 11, 2019 | 978-4-396-34504-4 |
| 9 | Sōufushin (双風神) | July 12, 2019 | 978-4-396-34546-4 |
| 0 | Koganehina (黄金雛) | November 11, 2019 | 978-4-396-34580-8 |
| 10 | Kasanetaihō (part 1) (襲大鳳（上）) | August 12, 2020 | 978-4-396-34594-5 |
| 11 | Kasanetaihō (part 2) (襲大鳳（下）) | November 15, 2020 | 978-4-396-34623-2 |
| SS | Koiorochi (恋大蛇) | March 19, 2022 | 978-4-396-34799-4 |

=== Manga ===
A manga adaptation of the first novel, Hikuidori, was announced on February 26, 2025. It is illustrated by Shinobu Seguchi and began serialization in Akita Shoten's shōnen manga magazine Weekly Shōnen Champion on April 24, 2025. The manga's chapters have been compiled into six tankōbon volumes as of August 2026.

| No. | Japanese release date | Japanese ISBN |
|---|---|---|
| 1 | September 8, 2025 | 978-4-253-00348-3 |
| 2 | November 7, 2025 | 978-4-253-00501-2 |
| 3 | January 8, 2026 | 978-4-253-00975-1 |
| 4 | March 6, 2026 | 978-4-253-01205-8 |
| 5 | June 8, 2026 | 978-4-253-01396-3 |
| 6 | August 6, 2026 | 978-4-253-01876-0 |

=== Anime ===
An anime television series adaptation of the first novel was also announced on February 26, 2025. Titled Oedo Fire Slayer: The Legend of Phoenix (火喰鳥 羽州ぼろ鳶組, Hikuidori Ushūboro Tobigumi), it is produced by SynergySP and directed by Hiroshi Yasumi, with Hajime Kamegaki serving as the "head director", Ryūsuke Mori handling series composition and writing the scripts alongside Shōhei Fukuda, Yoriko Tomita and Kōhei Nishimura, Bilba credited for original character designs, and Yasuharu Takanashi composing the music. The series aired from January 11 to April 5, 2026, on the Agaru Anime programming block on all JNN affiliates, including CBC TV and TBS. The opening theme song is "Hamidashi Gomen" (はみだし御免), performed by Porno Graffitti, while the ending theme song is "Kagerō" (陽炎; 'Heat Haze'), performed by Yo Oizumi. Crunchyroll is streaming the series. Medialink licensed the series in Southeast Asia and Oceania (except Australia and New Zealand) for streaming on Ani-One Asia's YouTube channel.

==== Episodes ====
| No. | Title | Directed by (Note: Production staff information is taken from the ending credits of each episode.) | Written by | Storyboarded by | Original release date |
|---|---|---|---|---|---|
| 1 | "Sparks of Rebirth"; Transliteration: "Saisei no Hidane" (Japanese: 再生の火種) | Hiroshi Yasumi | Ryūsuke Mori | Marisuke Eguchi | January 12, 2026 (Note: This episode aired at midnight JST, 30 minutes after the regular air time on CBC Television.) |
| 2 | "Rikishi in the Edge of the Ring"; Transliteration: "Dohyōgiwa no Rikishi" (Japanese: 土俵際の力士) | Hiroshi Yasumi | Ryūsuke Mori | Hajime Kamegaki & Jun Hatori | January 18, 2026 (Note: This episode aired at 11:55 p.m. JST, 25 minutes after the regular air time on CBC Television.) |
| 3 | "Handsome Man Flies Through the Sky"; Transliteration: "Tenkakeru Irōtoko" (Japanese: 天翔ける色男) | Maki Kamiya | Shōhei Fukuda | Yoshiaki Okumura | January 25, 2026 (Note: This episode aired at 11:45 p.m. JST, 15 minutes after the regular air time on CBC Television.) |
| 4 | "A Solitary Astronomer"; Transliteration: "Kokō no Tenmonka" (Japanese: 孤高の天文家) | Hiroshi Yasumi | Shōhei Fukuda | Takaharu Ozaki | February 1, 2026 |
| 5 | "Like a Twirling Star"; Transliteration: "Mabataku Hoshi Nogotoku" (Japanese: 瞬く星の如く) | Maki Kamiya | Shōhei Fukuda | Masakazu Amiya | February 15, 2026 |
| 6 | "The True Duty of a Fireman"; Transliteration: "Hikeshi no Honbun" (Japanese: 火消の本分) | Hiroshi Yasumi | Shōhei Fukuda | Hitoyuki Matsui | February 22, 2026 |
| 7 | "Under the Flowering Sky"; Transliteration: "Hanasaku Sora no Shita de" (Japanese: 花咲く空の下で) | Shūji Saitō | Ryūsuke Mori | Yukinobu Asai | March 1, 2026 |
| 8 | "The True Identity of the Fox"; Transliteration: "Yōko no Shōtai" (Japanese: 妖狐の正体) | Maki Kamiya | Kohei Nishimura | Daigo Kinoshita | March 8, 2026 |
| 9 | "A Disturbing Spark of Fire"; Transliteration: "Fuon'na Hinoko" (Japanese: 不穏な火の粉) | Hiroshi Yasumi | Shōhei Fukuda | Kenichi Higaki | March 15, 2026 |
| 10 | "The Roar of the Raging Fire"; Transliteration: "Mōka no Miedō" (Japanese: 猛火の鳴動) | Shūji Saitō | Shōhei Fukuda | Hitoyuki Matsui | March 22, 2026 |
| 11 | "The Great Meiwa Fire"; Transliteration: "Meiwa no Taika" (Japanese: 明和の大火) | Maki Kamiya | Ryūsuke Mori | Hideki Tonokatsu | March 29, 2026 |
| 12 | "Oedo Fire Slayer"; Transliteration: "Hikui Tori" (Japanese: 火喰鳥) | Hiroshi Yasumi | Kohei Nishimura | Hitoyuki Matsui | April 5, 2026 |
