= Yumia Fujisaki =

Japanese model and actress (born 2008)

- 藤﨑 ゆみあ
- Born: February 16, 2008 (age 18); Hiroshima Prefecture, Japan
- Occupation: Actress
- Years active: 2023–present
- Agent: Meteora
- Notable work: The Parades as Riko; Last Samurai Standing as Futaba Katsuki

Yumia Fujisaki (藤﨑 ゆみあ, Fujisaki Yumia; born February 16, 2008) is a Japanese actress.

== Career ==
On February 1, 2023, she joined the talent agency Meteora and moved to Tokyo that spring. At her older sister’s suggestion, she had first joined a local modeling agency in her hometown of Hiroshima, which marked the start of her career in entertainment.

She began her career in entertainment that same year. In July, she made her television drama debut in the Nippon Television Saturday drama The Greatest Teacher. On February 29, 2024, she made her film debut in the Netflix film, The Parades. On February 3, 2024, it was announced that she would star in the television adaptation of Last Samurai Standing, which began streaming on November 13, 2025, on Netflix.

== Filmography ==
=== Film ===
Year	Title	Role	Notes	Ref.
2023	The Parades	Riko		
2023	Mirrorliar Films Season 6	Kafune no Inori		
2026	You, Like a Star	Yui Kitahara (young)		

=== Television ===
==== Dramas ====
Year	Title	Role	Notes	Ref.
2023	The Greatest Teacher	Akutsu Yuri		
2023	The Greatest Teacher spinoff: Saiko no Kyoshi: 3 Nen Go no Bokutachi wa	Akutsu Yuri	Lead role; short drama	
2023	The Greatest Teacher spinoff: Haikei, otonaninaru anata e	Akutsu Yuri		
2025	Fujiko F. Fujio SF Tanpen Drama	Midori	Lead role; short drama	
2025	Ignite	Kana Todoroki		
2025	Teruko to Rui (照子と瑠衣)	Yuna	Episode 8	
2025	Last Samurai Standing	Kazuki Futaba		
2026	Mirai densha “ano hi” o shiranai anata e	Mitsuko Ogaki (1975), Yuki Kuramochi (high school flashback), Hana Murase (2024 / 2025)	Triple role	
2026	Hide And Seek: 0-Byō mae no kanojo	Yuki Arakawa		
2027	Twisted Sisters (ツイステッド・シスターズ)			

=== Music videos ===
Year	Song	Artist	Notes	Ref.
2023	”Yours”	Masaki Suda		
2024	"Cloud 9"	She's		
2026	"Let You Go"	Be-ray		
2026	"The Silence"	Vaundy		

== Commercials ==
- Chugoku Electric Power Transmission & Distribution Co., Inc. (2026)
- Daiichi Life Group, Inc. (2025)
- Ito En (2026)
- Koikeya
  - Kin no Potato (2026, with Masaki Aiba)
  - Pure Potato Oni no Utage (2025)
- Kosé Cosmetics
  - Scarat Extreme Cold Towel (2025)
- Kusuri no aoki (2024)
- Ministop (2026)
- Otsuka Pharmaceutical
  - Oronamin C (2024)
- Smaregi,Inc. (2025)
- Tokyo Metro (2025)
- TUMO Gunma (brand ambassador) (2024)
- Yaruki Switch Group 'Chichitoko no kattō' (2024)
