= Kangibanka =

Japanese manga series

- First tankōbon volume cover

カンギバンカ (Kangi Banka)
- Genre: Historical
- Manga
- Written by: Shogo Imamura
- Illustrated by: Kōji Megumi
- Published by: Kodansha
- Imprint: Shōnen Magazine Comics
- Magazine: Weekly Shōnen Magazine
- Original run: November 11, 2020 – July 14, 2021
- Volumes: 4

Kangibanka (Japanese: カンギバンカ, Hepburn: Kangi Banka) is a Japanese manga series adapted from a novel written by Shogo Imamura and illustrated by Kōji Megumi. it was serialized in Kodansha's shōnen manga magazine Weekly Shōnen Magazine from November 2020 to July 2021, with its chapters have been collected in four tankōbon volumes as of September 2021.

== Premise ==
Japan, Sengoku period, the era of provinces at war where cruelty and famine wreak havoc. Kuhé is a fourteen-year-old orphan, responsible for his younger brother. Captured by slave traders, they are saved at a bend in the road by a group of child thieves. The leader of the gang, Tamonmaru, has a dream: to build a country where theft will no longer exist, a haven of peace in this turbulent world. Kuhé, struck by the audacity and grandeur of this ideal, decides to follow it!

== Publication ==
Originally written by Shogo Imamura based on his Jinkan novel and illustrated by Kōji Megumi, Kangibanka started in Kodansha's shōnen manga magazine Weekly Shōnen Magazine on November 11, 2020. On July 9, 2021, Megumi completed the final chapter of the Manga; and the manga finished serialization in the magazine on July 14, 2021. Kodansha has collected its chapters into individual tankōbon volumes. The first volume was released on February 17, 2021. As of September 16, 2021, Four volumes have been released.

In France, the manga is licensed by Pika.

=== Volumes ===
No.	Release date	ISBN
1	February 17, 2021	978-4-06522-066-5
2	April 16, 2021	978-4-06522-987-3
3	July 15, 2021	978-4-06523-589-8
4	September 16, 2021	978-4-06524-829-4

== Reception ==
In a review of the first two volumes, Faustine Lillaz of Planete BD gave a good score to the first volume, she said that everything illustrated with great care and called the manga promising. In the second volume, she gave a good grade to the drawings, but criticized some characters for not having credibility. Manga Sanctuary rated the first volume 8 out of 10, praised the drawings stating them as "very careful, fine lines, lots of details with neat decorations and very pleasant to watch" and they praised the manga story. The reviewer praised the section battles and feels them like Ghost of Tsushima, and they called the third volume "very good" rated 7 out of 10. Manga News considers the beginning of the manga relatively good and quite effective and similar to the Sidooh manga; and criticizes the last volume and calls the end of the manga a rushed ending.
