= Last Samurai Standing =

Japanese manga series

- First tankōbon volume cover

イクサガミ (Ikusagami)
- Genre: Action; Historical
- Manga
- Written by: Shogo Imamura
- Illustrated by: Katsumi Tatsuzawa
- Published by: Kodansha
- English publisher: NA: Kodansha USA
- Imprint: Morning KC
- Magazine: Morning
- Original run: December 8, 2022 – present
- Volumes: 8
- Television drama
- Last Samurai Standing (2025–present)
- icon

Last Samurai Standing (Japanese: イクサガミ, Hepburn: Ikusagami; 'God of War') is a Japanese manga series adapted from the novel of the same name written by Shogo Imamura and illustrated by Katsumi Tatsuzawa. It has been serialized in Kodansha's seinen manga magazine Morning since December 2022, with its chapters collected in eight tankōbon volumes as of November 2026.

A live-action television series was released on Netflix in November 2025. A second season has been announced.

== Plot ==
It's 1878, the 11th year of the Meiji era. The samurai period is coming to an end. One day, flier-type information is being passed around inviting samurai and those who excelled in martial arts to Tenryū-ji in Kyoto to an event where they can win ¥100000. 292 samurai gather at the temple. There, those participating in the tournament, called Kodoku, are given a wooden tag, each one of them is worth 1 point. Then, they are informed of the rules: "Collect points travelling along the Tokaido road to Tokyo." The way they are to win points is by killing other participants and gathering their tags.

== Media ==
=== Manga ===
Originally written by Shogo Imamura, based on his novel Ikusagami, and illustrated by Katsumi Tatsuzawa, Last Samurai Standing began publication in Kodansha's seinen manga magazine Morning on December 8, 2022. Kodansha has collected its chapters into individual tankōbon volumes. The first volume was released on April 21, 2023. As of November 20, 2026, eight volumes have been released.

In North America, the manga has been licensed by Kodansha USA for release in English.

==== Volumes ====
No.	Original release date	Original ISBN	English release date	English ISBN
1	April 21, 2023	978-4-06-531334-3	July 22, 2025	979-8-88877-516-5
2	July 21, 2023	978-4-06-532393-9	September 23, 2025	979-8-88877-517-2
3	December 21, 2023	978-4-06-534013-4	November 11, 2025	979-8-88877-518-9
4	May 22, 2024	978-4-06-535583-1	January 13, 2026	979-8-88877-519-6
5	October 23, 2025	978-4-06-538847-1	July 14, 2026	979-8-88877-811-1
6	November 21, 2025	978-4-06-541410-1	October 13, 2026	979-8-88877-920-0
7	June 23, 2026	978-4-06-543949-4	March 16, 2027	979-8-88877-980-4
8	November 20, 2026	978-4-06-545551-7	July 6, 2027	979-8-90074-279-3

=== Live-action drama ===
Netflix announced the production of a Last Samurai Standing series, starring Junichi Okada, who also served as co-executive producer and action choreographer. Michihito Fujii and Kento Yamaguchi are its writer and director, produced by Office Shirous. About his multi-role in the drama, Okada said "When Netflix executive producer Mr. Takahashi reached out to me, I was still acting in historical dramas. Back then, I was already thinking of ways to make this genre a hit, not just in Japan, but all over the world. I saw their potential for action, drama, social commentary, and entertainment, but I knew they could be taken further. That's when I came across Imamura's novel. It was written in a way that modern audiences could enjoy, and I was excited about the idea of adapting it". The series started streaming on November 13, 2025 with Junichi Okada as protagonist Shujiro Saga; Riho Yoshioka as Shujiro's wife, Shino; Yumia Fujisaki as Futaba Katsuki; Kaya Kiyohara as Iroha Kinugasa; Taichi Saotome as Shikura Adashino; Yuya Endo as Sansuke Gion; Masahiro Higashide as Kyojin Tsuge; Shota Sometani as Kocha Kamuy; Hiroshi Tamaki as Ukyo Kikuomi; Takayuki Yamada as Jinbe Ando; Kairi Jo as Shinjiro Sayama; Wataru Ichinose as Raizo Tachibana; Hideaki Itō as Bukotsu Kanjiya; Yasushi Fuchikami as Sakura; and Enju, played by Kazunari Ninomiya.

== Reception ==
Aki Nakano of Kodansha Comic Plus finds the Last Samurai Standing manga adaptation of Shōgo Imamura's novel a gruesome, vividly rendered death game set in the chaotic early Meiji period, with a great sense of pacing and mesmerizing characters. Zen Narita, in a review for Da Vinci News, praised Katsumi Tatsuzawa's manga art, describing them as "moment-to-moment", facial expressions and physical movements of the characters in battle as "dynamic and enjoyable."

The series was included in the American Library Association's 2025 Best Graphic Novels for Adults list.
