= Last Samurai Standing (TV series) =

2025 Japanese historical television series

- Promotional poster

Japanese name
- Kanji: イクサガミ
Transcriptions
- Romanization: Ikusagami
- Genre: Action; Historical drama; Jidaigeki
- Based on: Last Samurai Standing by Shogo Imamura
- Written by: Kento Yamaguchi; Michihito Fujii
- Directed by: Michihito Fujii; Kento Yamaguchi; Toru Yamamoto
- Creative director: Junichi Okada
- Starring: Junichi Okada; Yumia Fujisaki; Kaya Kiyohara; Masahiro Higashide; Hideaki Itō; Gaku Hamada; Hiroshi Abe
- Music by: Ko Omama
- Country of origin: Japan
- Original language: Japanese
- No. of seasons: 1
- No. of episodes: 6

Production
- Executive producer: Shinichi Takahashi
- Producers: Kosuke Oshida; Junichi Okada
- Cinematography: Keisuke Imamura; Hiroki Yamada
- Running time: 47–58 minutes
- Production companies: Office Shirous; Netflix

Original release
- Network: Netflix
- Release: 13 November 2025 – present

Last Samurai Standing (Japanese: イクサガミ, Hepburn: Ikusagami) is a 2025 Japanese Netflix original live-action television series adapted from the novel of the same name written by Shogo Imamura. Starring Junichi Okada, Yumia Fujisaki and Kaya Kiyohara, and set in the late 19th century during the Meiji period, the series takes place at the Tenryūji monastery in Kyoto.

The first two episodes of the series premiered at the 30th Busan International Film Festival in the On Screen section on September 18, 2025. Following its festival release, the six episodes series became available to stream worldwide on Netflix from November 13, 2025. A second season was confirmed by Netflix Japan.

== Synopsis ==
During the Meiji era (late 19th century), 292 fighters come together at Tenryū-ji Temple in Kyoto, drawn by the chance to win a grand prize of ¥100,000. The challenge is clear: take each other's wooden tags and make it all the way to Tokyo. The winner takes the prize. One of the warriors, Shujiro Saga, joins the dangerous contest with a personal mission: to help his sick wife and child.

== Cast ==
- Junichi Okada as Shujiro Saga
- Yumia Fujisaki as Futaba Katsuki
- Kaya Kiyohara as Iroha Kinugasa
- Masahiro Higashide as Kyojin Tsuge
- Shota Sometani as Kamuykocha
- Taichi Saotome as Shikura Adashino
- Yuya Endo as Sansuke Gion
- Taiiku Okazaki as Jinroku Keage, one of the successors of the Kyohachiryu school
- Kairi Jo as Shinnosuke Sayama
- Yasushi Fuchikami as Sakura
- Takaaki Enoki
- Yoshi Sakou
- Satoru Matsuo
- Toshihiro Yashiba
- Daisuke Kuroda
- Mitsuo Yoshihara
- Wataru Ichinose as Raizo Tachibana
- Takashi Sasano
- Yuya Matsuura
- Ryudo Uzaki
- Arata Iura as Toshimichi Ōkubo
- Tetsushi Tanaka as Hisoka Maejima, Director of the Post Office
- Ayumu Nakajima as Shinpei Nagase, Toshimichi Ōkubo's secretary
- Riho Yoshioka as Shino Saga, Shujiro's wife
- Takayuki Yamada as Jinbe Ando
- Kazunari Ninomiya as Enju
- Hiroshi Tamaki as Ukyo Kikuomi
- Hideaki Itō as Bukotsu Kanjiya
- Gaku Hamada as Toshiyoshi Kawaji, Superintendent-General of police
- Ryusei Yokohama as Toya Tenmyo
- Hiroshi Abe as Gentosai Okabe

== Episodes ==
No.	Title	Directed by	Written by	Original release date
1	"Kodoku"	Michihito Fujii	Kento Yamaguchi & Michihito Fujii	November 13, 2025
Former samurai Shujiro Saga loses his daughter to cholera, and his wife also falls sick. In order to save his family, Shujiro responds to a notice about a martial arts tournament in Kyoto that has a prize of ¥100,000. The participants arrive at Tenryū-ji and are told by Enju, an official, that they are to play a game called "Kodoku". Participants are each given a numbered tag and must pass seven checkpoints on the Tōkaidō Road from Kyoto to Tokyo and arrive in one month, by June 5th. Points are needed to pass each checkpoint, and are gained by taking other participants' tags. After a countdown, the participants erupt into fighting. Shujiro is initially paralyzed but rouses himself to help Futaba Katsuki, a young participant who reminds him of his daughter. Shujiro is unable to draw his sword but collects a tag for Futaba, while another participant recognizes Shujiro as "Kokushu the Manslayer" and gives him a spare tag to proceed. After leaving the shrine, Shujiro is attacked by Bukotsu Kanjiya, another participant who recognizes him. The game is being watched by four wealthy men, who thank the organizer for inviting them. The organizer tells them to enjoy and watch the end of the samurais.
2	"Awakening"	Michihito Fujii	Kento Yamaguchi & Michihito Fujii	November 13, 2025
Bukotsu provokes Shujiro into drawing his sword but Shujiro does not complete a killing blow, enraging Bukotsu. Futaba helps Shujiro escape and they are approached by Kyojin Tsuge, the participant who helped them. According to Kyojin's points calculation, a maximum of 9 players can win the game, so he suggests they form an alliance and investigate the organizer's intentions. Futaba tells Shujiro she is a shrine maiden who joined the game to provide for her sick mother and the children in her shrine, and asks to join him. In Tokyo, Superintendent General Kawaji reports to Home Minister Lord Okubo about a "tournament" of outlawed samurai. Bukotsu harasses villagers while trying to find Shujiro, and is confronted by Ukyo Kikuomi, a game participant and former samurai who was abandoned by his master; Bukotsu kills Ukyo. Shujiro and Futaba stumble on a group of participants who are killed by Kodoku officers when they quit the game. Enraged, Shujiro kills the entire squad of officers.
3	"Fate"	Kento Yamaguchi	Kento Yamaguchi & Michihito Fujii	November 13, 2025
Shujiro and Futaba are joined by participant Iroha Kinugasa, Shujiro's adoptive sister of the Kyohachi-ryu sword school. The trio avoid participants who attack them and are helped by Kamuykocha, an Ainu participant who promises not to attack them when they are with Futaba. When Shujiro, Futaba and Iroha pass through the Seki-juku checkpoint, they are told by the Kodoku officer that Shujiro and Iroha are familiar with "Kodoku" – the pair were once ordered to kill their fellow sword siblings by Gentosai, head of Kyohachi-ryu, though Shujiro fled before he could be forced to participate. The trio find Kyojin and join him for an alliance. Kawaji reports to Okubo news of former samurai fighting each other and slowly moving towards Tokyo, and that the guns used at Kyoto were purchased by four zaibatsu. The zaibatsu are the four men who are following and betting on the game. Gentosai is participating in the game to hunt surviving successors of Kyohachi-ryu.
4	"The Mastermind"	Toru Yamamoto	Kento Yamaguchi & Michihito Fujii	November 13, 2025
Iroha joined the game after being invited by Kyohachi-ryu sibling Sansuke, who wants to use the game to flush out and kill Gentosai. Kyojin explains his plan to his group of allies. At Kuwana-juku, the group are ambushed at a teahouse but fight off the attackers and arrange for the responsible participant to be arrested by the police. Another participant, Shinnosuke Sayama, joins the group. Kyojin sees Kodoku officers execute the participant in order to hide the secret of the game, and is caught by them. Following Kyojin's plan, Shujiro pretends to be dead and is taken by Kodoku officers to a zaibatsu bank, where he is confronted by Hanjiro Nakamura, his samurai friend from the past who has become a Kodoku officer. In Yokkaichi-juku, Bukotsu encounters Kamuykocha and provokes him into a fight, which is broken up by Kodoku officers. Kawaji promises Okubo to find and arrest the four zaibatsu, but he is secretly the game organizer in league with them.
5	"Specters"	Kento Yamaguchi	Kento Yamaguchi & Michihito Fujii	November 13, 2025
Kyojin escapes the Kodoku officers. Shujiro fights Hanjiro to a stalemate, which is broken up by Iroha, who helps him escape. The group regather and conclude that the central Police Bureau are involved with the game. Kawaji meets up with the four zaibatsu but reports to Okubo that he hasn't found anything. Shujiro sends a message to Hisoka Maejime, an old contact who works closely with Okubo, asking for protection. At the Chiryu-juku checkpoint, Futaba successfully convinces the others to give Shinnosuke their spare tags so he can pass. Kyojin decides they should split up for safety, and goes with Shinnosuke while Shujiro travels with the others. Shinpei, Okubo's secretary, deciphers the zaibatsu's telegrams but is intercepted by Enju and killed before he can report his findings. Kyojin makes contact with Sansuke and Shikura, Shujiro and Iroha's sword siblings.
6	"Mortal Combat"	Michihito Fujii	Kento Yamaguchi & Michihito Fujii	November 13, 2025
Shujiro, Iroha and Futaba stumble upon a matsuri. Bukotsu finds them there and attacks Shujiro and Futaba; Shujiro wins the fight, finally killing Bukotsu. Iroha realizes Gentosai is also at the matsuri and draws him away into another fight. Sansuke and Shikura, who were told where to go by Kyojin, arrive to help Iroha but they are unable to kill Gentosai and escape. Okubo is killed by Hanjiro on Kawaji's orders. Shujiro and Futaba arrive at Okazaki-juku, where they're supposed to come under Maejime's protection, but receive a telegram supposedly from Maejime telling them to proceed to Tokyo. Iroha believes that they can only defeat Gentosai if all the siblings fight him together. Kyojin is secretly working with Gentosai.

== Production ==
Netflix announced the production of a "Last Samurai Standing" series, starring Junichi Okada, who is also producer and action choreographer. Michihito Fujii and Kento Yamaguchi are its writer and director, produced by Office Shirous. About his multi-role in the drama, Okada said:

When Netflix executive producer Mr. Takahashi reached out to me, I was still acting in historical dramas. Back then, I was already thinking of ways to make this genre a hit, not just in Japan, but all over the world. I saw their potential for action, drama, social commentary, and entertainment, but I knew they could be taken further. That's when I came across Imamura's novel. It was written in a way that modern audiences could enjoy, and I was excited about the idea of adapting it.

The adaption of the novel into a multi-episode drama series involved significant creative challenges for the directors Michihito Fujii and Junichi Okada, it was like producing three feature-length films. They worked carefully to preserve the original story's core themes, while enhancing its visual and dramatic appeal. The production featured nearly 300 actors, each requiring their own costume, which demanded consistent coordination and commitment from the entire crew.

A second season was confirmed by Netflix, the series' director and lead actor, after Netflix France leaked the news.

== Release ==
Last Samurai Standing was selected for the 'On Screen' section at the 30th Busan International Film Festival, where the first two episodes of the series were screened on September 18, 2025. The series started streaming from November 13, 2025, on Netflix.

== Reception ==
On the review aggregator website Rotten Tomatoes, 100% of 12 critics' reviews are positive.

== Awards ==
Award	Date of ceremony	Category	Recipient(s)	Result	Ref.
2026 Critics Choice Awards	January 4, 2026	TV Nominations ~ Best Foreign Language Series		Nominated	
