= Yamashiro, Kyoto =

City district

Yamashiro (山城町, Yamashiro-chō) is a district of the city of Kizugawa, Kyoto Prefecture, Japan. It was named for the old Yamashiro Province. It was a town in its own right in Sōraku District until 2007. Yamashiro and the towns of Kamo and Kizu (all from Sōraku District) merged to create the city of Kizugawa on 12 March 2007.

As of 2003, the town had an estimated population of 8,978 and a density of 366.00 persons per km^{2}. The total area was 24.53 km^{2}.

== Points of interest ==
- Kyoto Prefectural Yamashiro Regional Museum
