= Kuni-kyō =

Capital city of Japan between 740 and 744

- モヨロ貝塚 (Japanese)
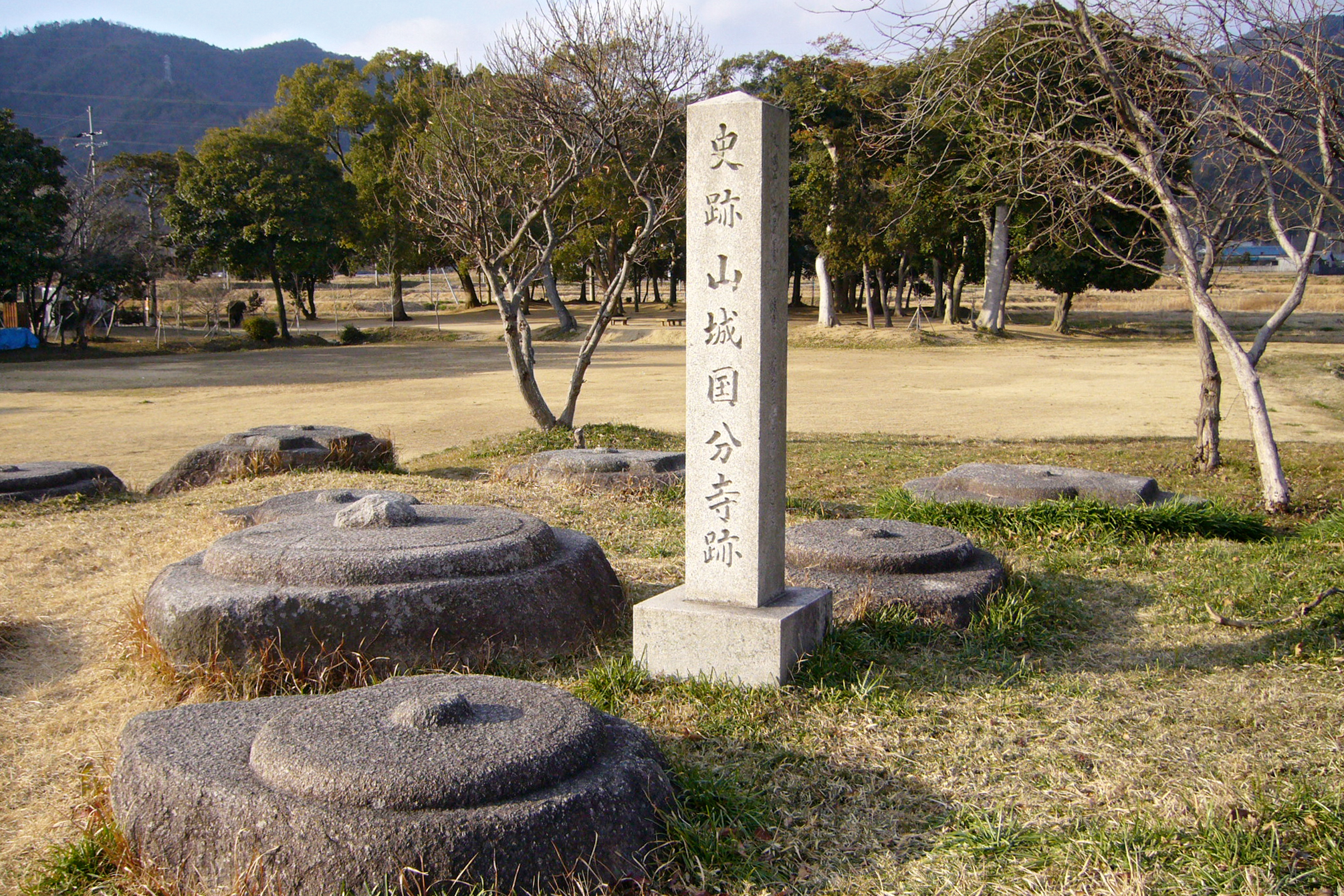
- Yamashiro Kokubun-ji ruins

- Kuni-kyō Kuni-kyō (Japan)
- Interactive map of Kuni-kyō
- 34°45′56″N 135°51′46″E
- Periods: Nara period
- Location: Kizugawa, Kyoto, Japan
- Region: Kansai region

Site notes
- Public access: Yes (no facilities at site)
- Website: Official website

Kuni-kyō (恭仁京; or Kuni no miyako) was the capital of Japan between 740 and 744, with its imperial palace (恭仁宮 Kuni-kyū or Kuni no miya) built in what is now the Kamo neighborhood of the city of Kizugawa in Kyoto Prefecture. The ruins of the palace overlap with the ruins of Yamashiro Kokubun-ji (山城国分寺), and both were collectively designated as a National Historic Site of Japan in 1957, with the area under protection expanded in 2007.

== History ==
After the Fujiwara no Hirotsugu rebellion, the capital was moved from Heijō-kyō by decree of Emperor Shōmu on December 15, 740. The new site was located in Soraku County, Yamashiro Province; nevertheless, its official name was "Yamato no Kuni no Omiya." The reason for choosing this location may have been because it was the stronghold of the Udaijin Tachibana no Moroe, who had de facto power over the "dajō-kan" or "Great Council".

In September 741, the layout of the new capital was decided, and in November the official name "Daiyotoku Kuninomiya" was decided upon. The Daigokuden was dismantled and relocated from Heijō-kyō, the Ōmiya fence was constructed, and the palace was built. The grid-like land was laid out, and a large bridge was built over the Kizu River. The area of the palace is estimated to have been 560 meters wide east-to-west and 750 meters long north-to-south. The narrow valley to the west and the floodplain of the Kizu River to the east geographically restricted the size of Kuni-kyō to an area smaller than Heijō-kyō.

For reasons which remain unclear, Kuni-kyō was not completed. Emperor Shōmu moved the capital to the present-day city of Kōka, Shiga Prefecture, more specifically the Shigaraki Palace (紫香楽宮) in 744, only four years later. Emperor Shōmu moved the capital yet again to Naniwa-kyō (Osaka), and before the year was out, reverted the capital back to Heijō-kyō in Nara. The preference of Shigaraki as the capital over Kuni-kyō possibly points to the rival Fujiwara clan mounting a comeback, since their influence extended around the Shigaraki area in Ōmi Province. The subsequent move to Naniwa may have been a compromise.

In 748, after the capital was moved, the Daigokuden of Kuni-kyō was donated to the Yamashiro Kokubun-ji.

Archaeological excavations have so far (as of 2006) revealed key buildings, laid out following the Chinese pattern, such as the Daigokuden (大極殿) and Dairi (内裏). However, no remains of the grid system of streets have been confirmed

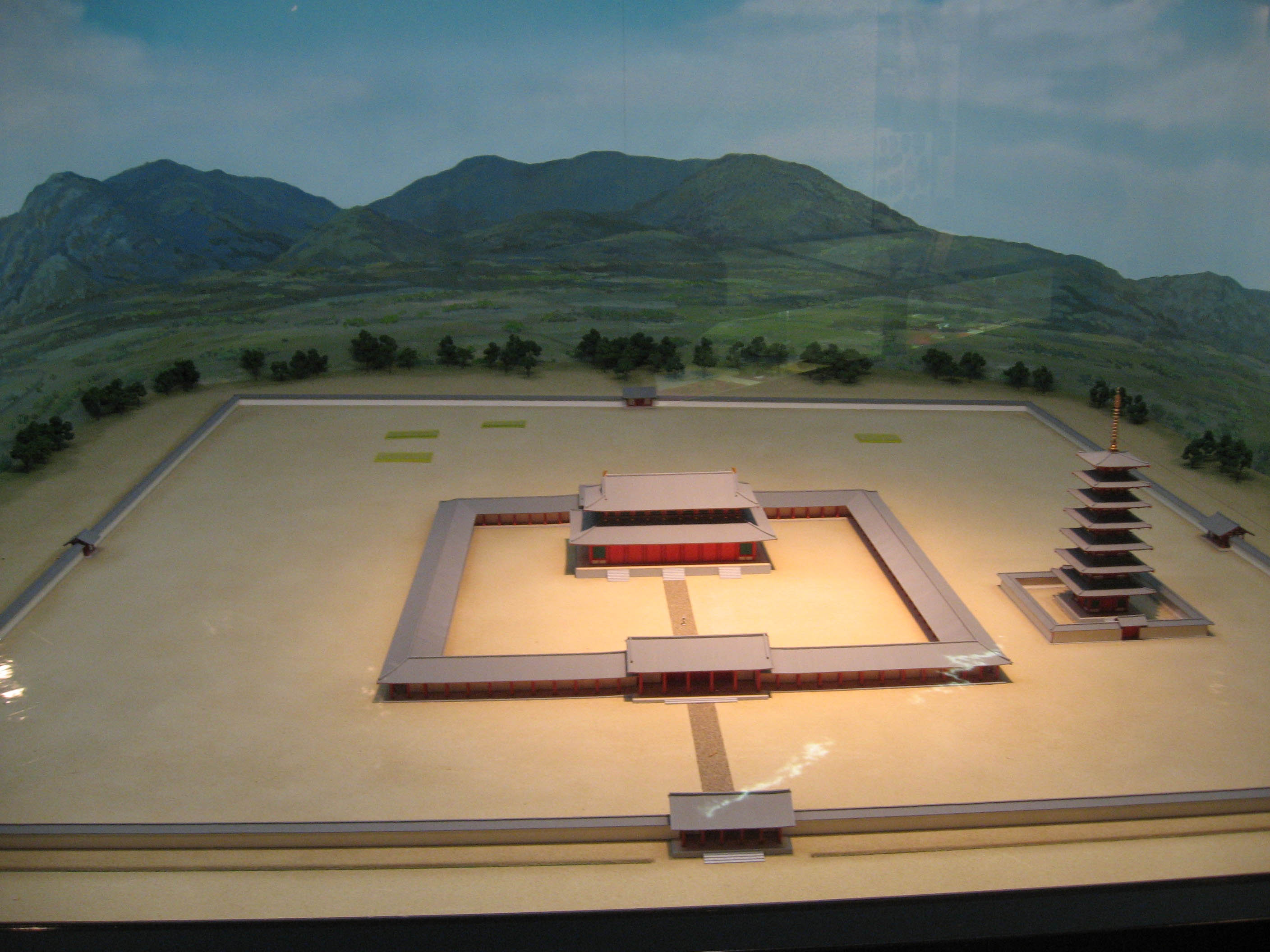
Miniature Model of the Yamashiro Kokubun-ji

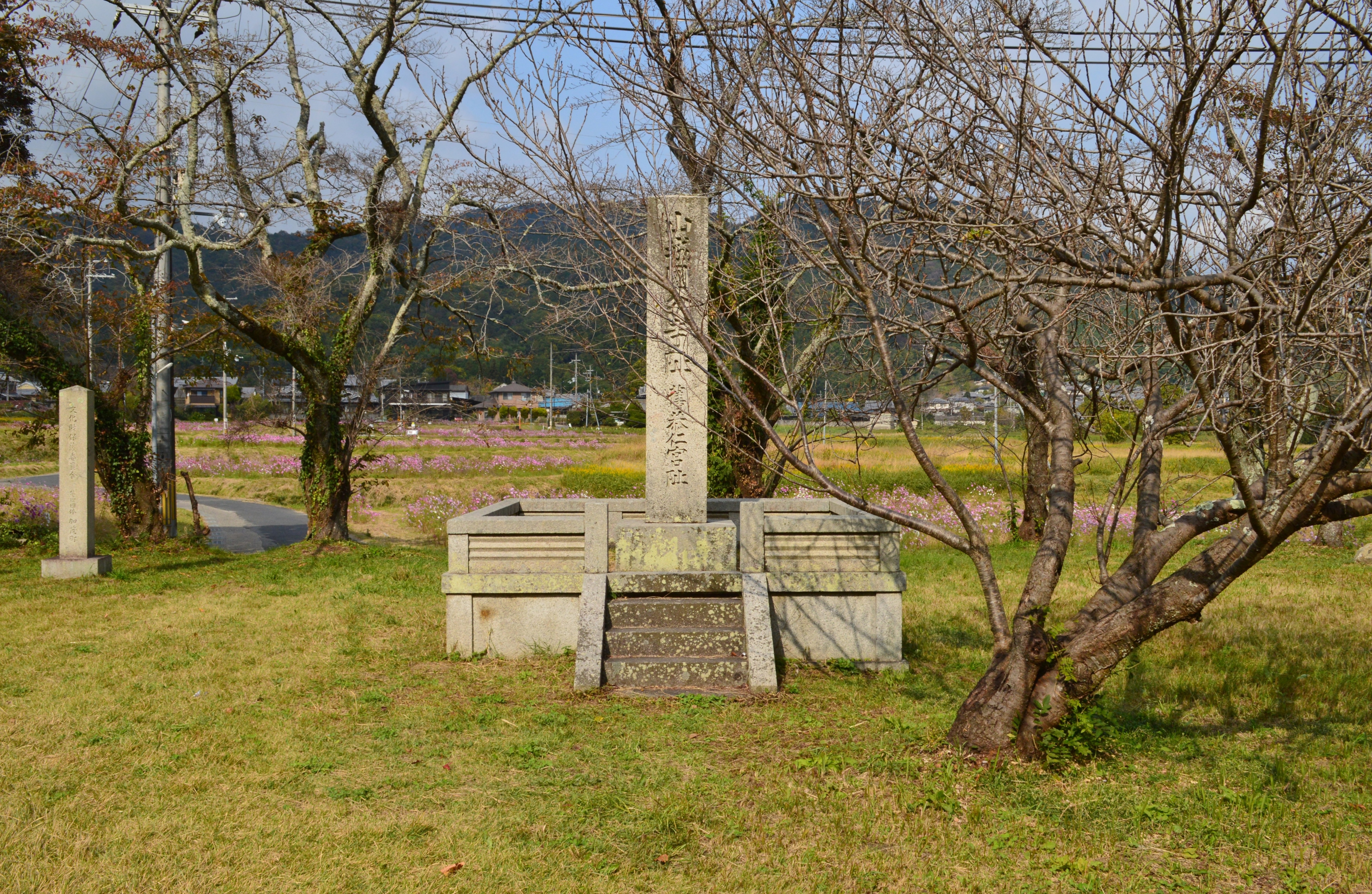
Site of Kuni-kyō's Daigokuden

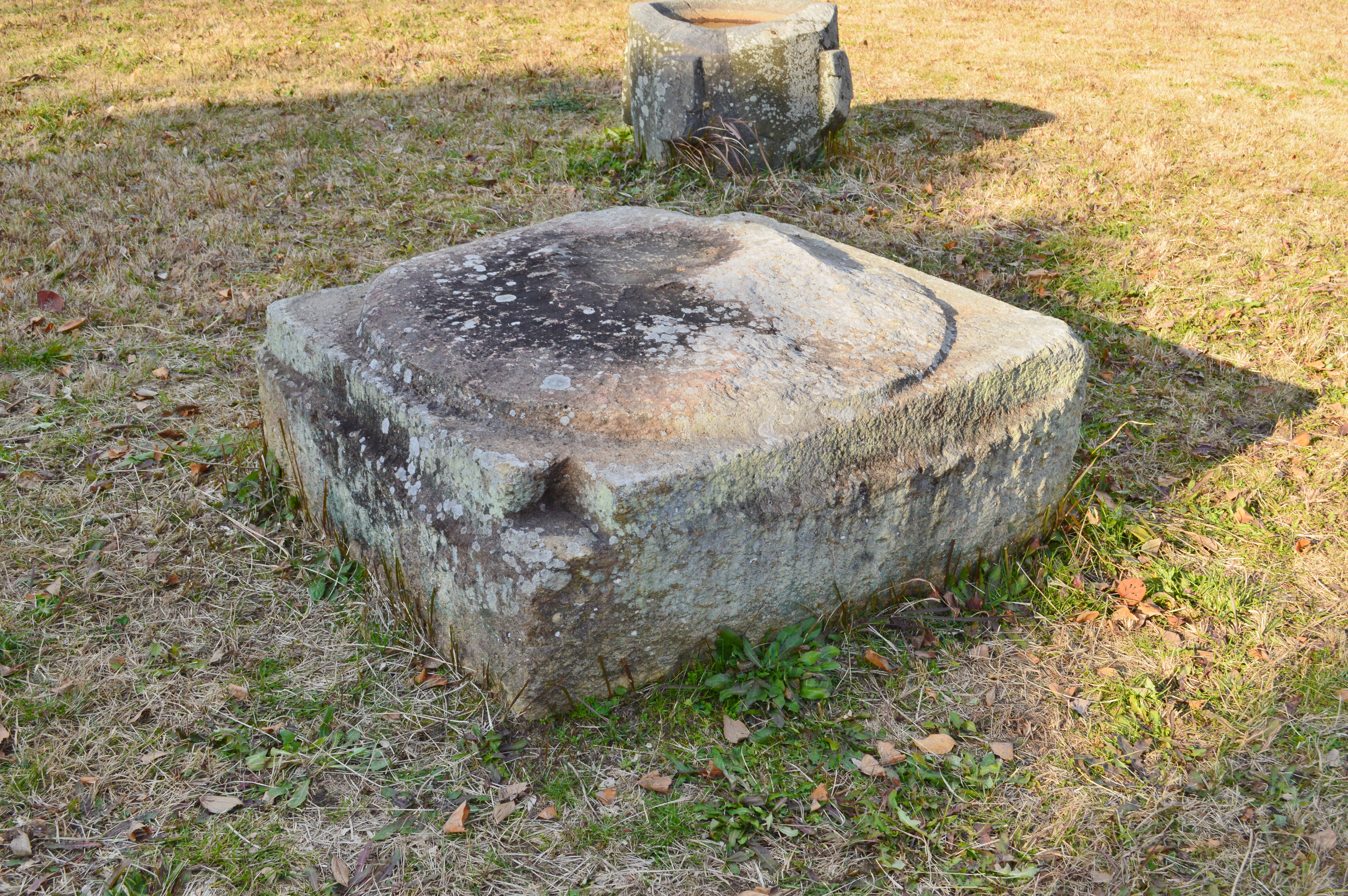
Foundation stone for the Yamashiro Kokubun-ji Kondo

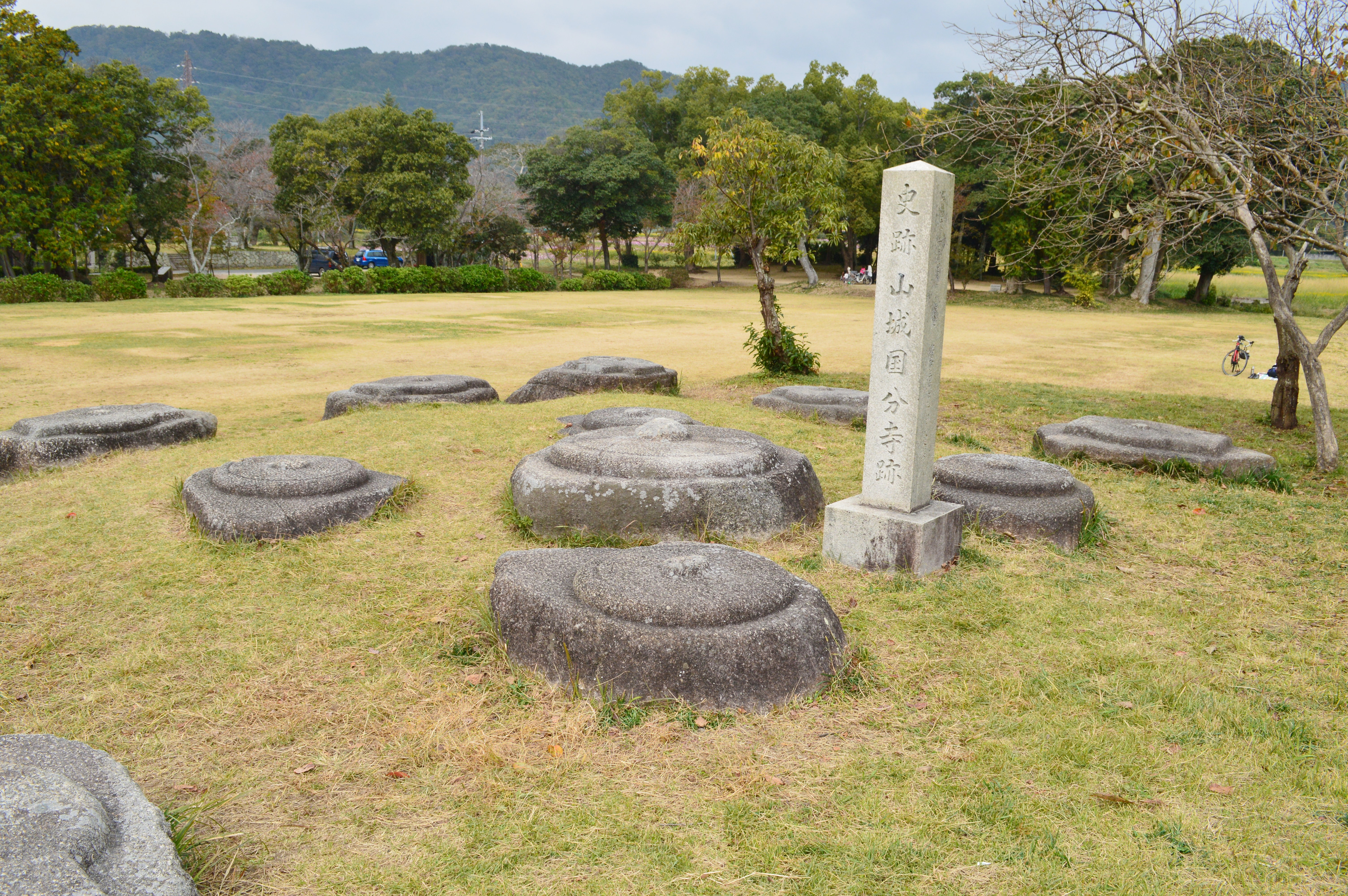
Foundation stone for the Yamashiro Kokubun-ji Pagoda

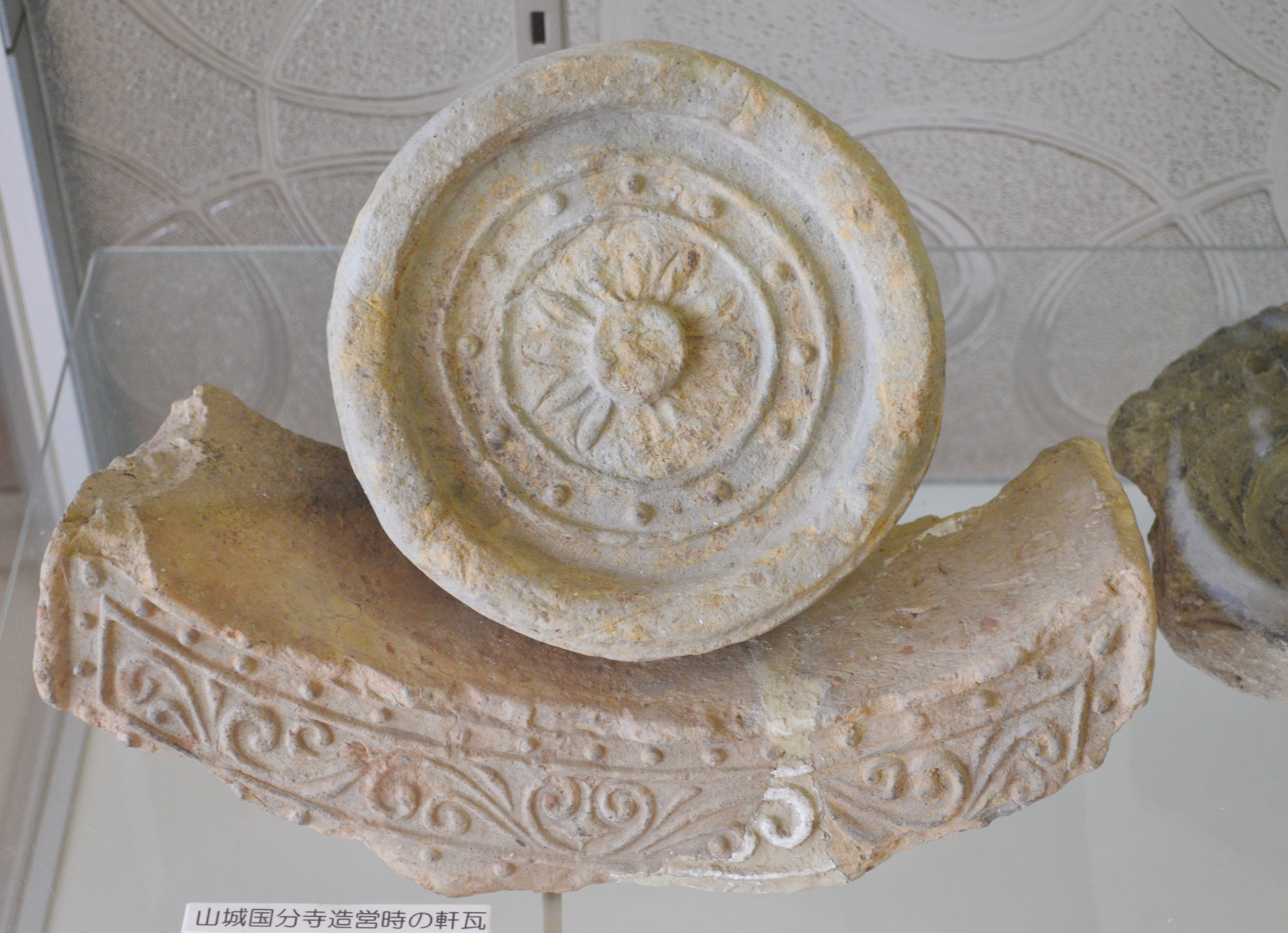
Roof tiles from the Kuni-kyō site

== Yamashiro Kokubun-ji ==
The Shoku Nihongi records that in 741, as the country recovered from a major smallpox epidemic, Emperor Shōmu ordered that a monastery and nunnery be established in every province, the kokubunji (国分寺). These temples were built to a semi-standardized template, and served both to spread Buddhist orthodoxy to the provinces and to emphasize the power of the Nara period centralized government under the Ritsuryō system.

It is uncertain when construction of the Yamashiro Kokubun-ji temples began and was completed, but as it is mentioned in Shoku Nihongi in an entry dated 741, construction must have begun at about the same time as the move of the capital from Heijō-kyō. Currently, a long earthen platform stretching east-to-west remains to the north of Kuni Elementary School, and this is believed to be the foundation for the Kokubun-ji Kondō Hall, or in other words, the re-purposed Kuni-kyō Daigokuden. There are also 15 large foundation stones to the east of the school at a place called Tō-no-moto-moto, which is said to be the site of the eastern pagoda of the temple. The base is 17 square meters, and supported a seven-story pagoda, with the first floor measuring 9.8 square meters.

The temple burned down in 882 and was rebuilt in 898. It is listed in the Engishiki records of 927 as having revenues of 15,000 bundles of rice. In the Kamakura period, a historical document from 1231 indicates that it was a branch temple of Byōdō-in, while another document from 1301 indicates that it was the property of Kasuga Shrine. The temple's subsequent history is unclear, but it appears to have been abandoned sometime in the Muromachi period.

The site is a 30 minute walk from Kamo Station on the JR West Kansai Main Line (Yamatoji Line)

== See also ==
- List of Historic Sites of Japan (Kyoto)

Preceded by Heijō-kyō	Capital of Japan; 740–744	Succeeded by Naniwa-kyō
