= Sōraku District =

District in Kyoto Prefecture, Japan

Coordinates: 34.769°N 135.961°E

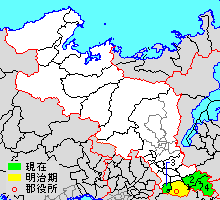
Location of Sōraku in Kyoto prefecture

Sōraku (相楽郡, Sōraku-gun) is a district in Kyoto Prefecture, Japan.

As of 2007, the district had an estimated population of 44,982 and a density of 252.27 persons per km^{2}. The total area is 178.31 km^{2}. It has a natural water sanctuary, Kyoto Minami-Yamashiro.

== Towns and villages ==
- Kasagi
- Minamiyamashiro
- Seika
- Wazuka

=== Former towns ===
The following towns merged to create the new city of Kizugawa on March 12, 2007.

- Kamo
- Kizu
- Yamashiro
