= Kamo, Kyoto =

Dissolved municipality in Kyoto prefecture, Japan

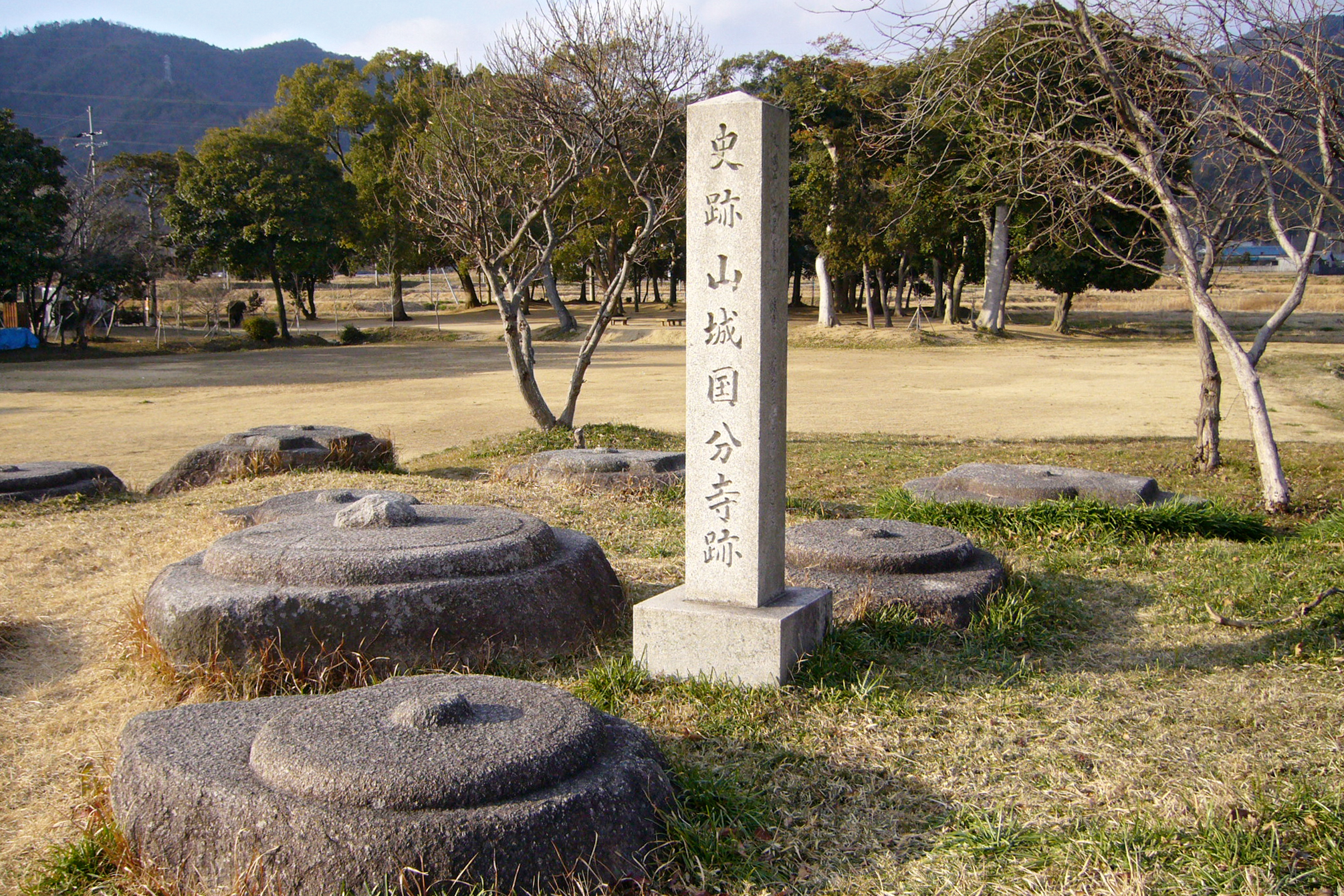
Kuni-kyō ruins. It was the Imperial capital of Japan between 740 and 743.

Kamo (加茂町, Kamo-chō) is a district of the city of Kizugawa, Kyoto Prefecture, Japan. It was a town in its own right in Sōraku District until 2007.

Kamo and the towns of Kizu and Yamashiro (all from Sōraku District) merged to create the city of Kizugawa on March 12, 2007. As of February 1, 2007, prior to the merger, Kamo had an estimated population of 15,907 and a density of 430.27 persons per km^{2}. The total area was 36.97 km^{2}.

Between the years of 740 to 744, Kamo had been the capital of Japan named Kuni-kyō.
