= Kizugawa =

Kizugawa 木津川市
- City
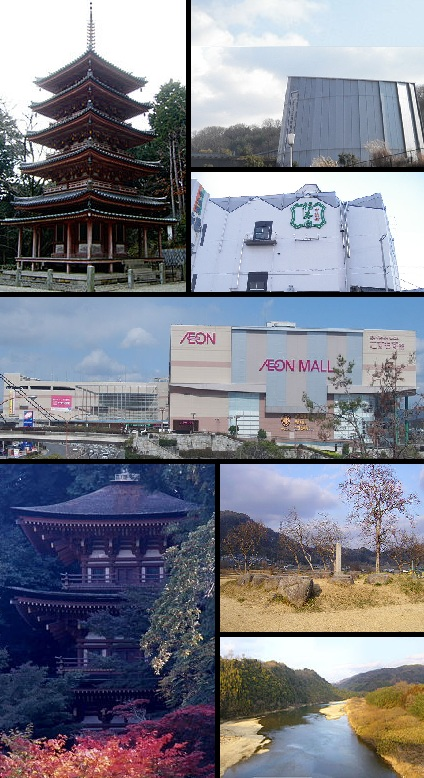
- From upper left, clockwise: Kaijyūsen-ji; Kids' Science Museum of Photons; Fukujyuen Cha Research Center; Æon Mall Takanohara; Kuni-kyō Ruins; Kizu River

- Flag Emblem
- Interactive map of Kizugawa
- Location in Japan
- Coordinates: 34°44′14″N 135°49′12″E
- Country: Japan
- Region: Kansai
- Prefecture: Kyoto

Government
  - Mayor: Yūichi Taniguchi

Area
  - Total: 85.13 km^{2} (32.87 sq mi)

Population (August 1, 2023)
  - Total: 79,866
  - Density: 938.2/km^{2} (2,430/sq mi)
- Time zone: UTC+09:00 (JST)
- City hall address: Kizu Minami-gaito 110-9, Kizugawa-shi, Kyoto-fu; 619-0286
- Website: Official website
- Symbols
- Flower: Cosmos
- Tree: Cherry blossom

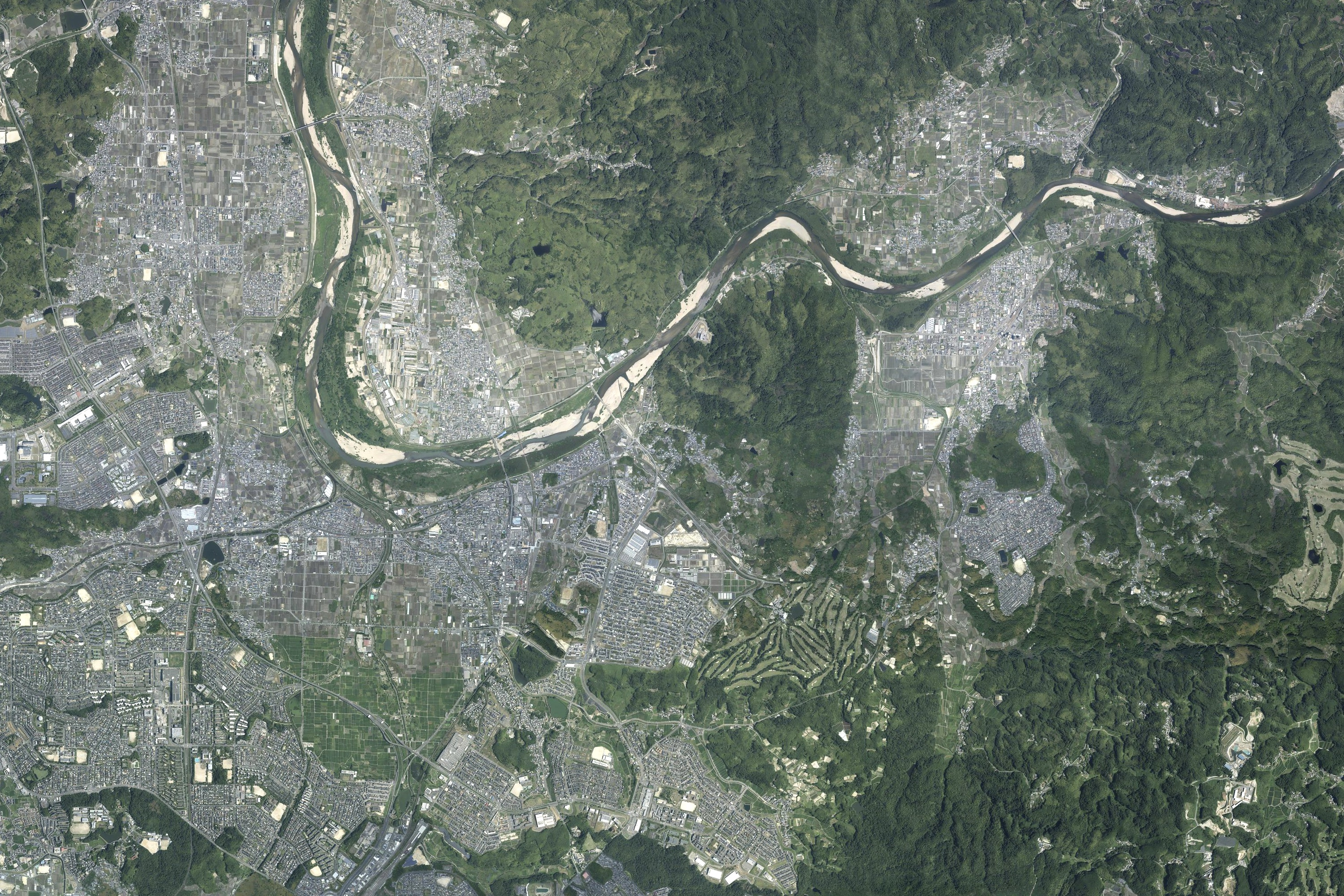
Aerial photograph of center area in 2021

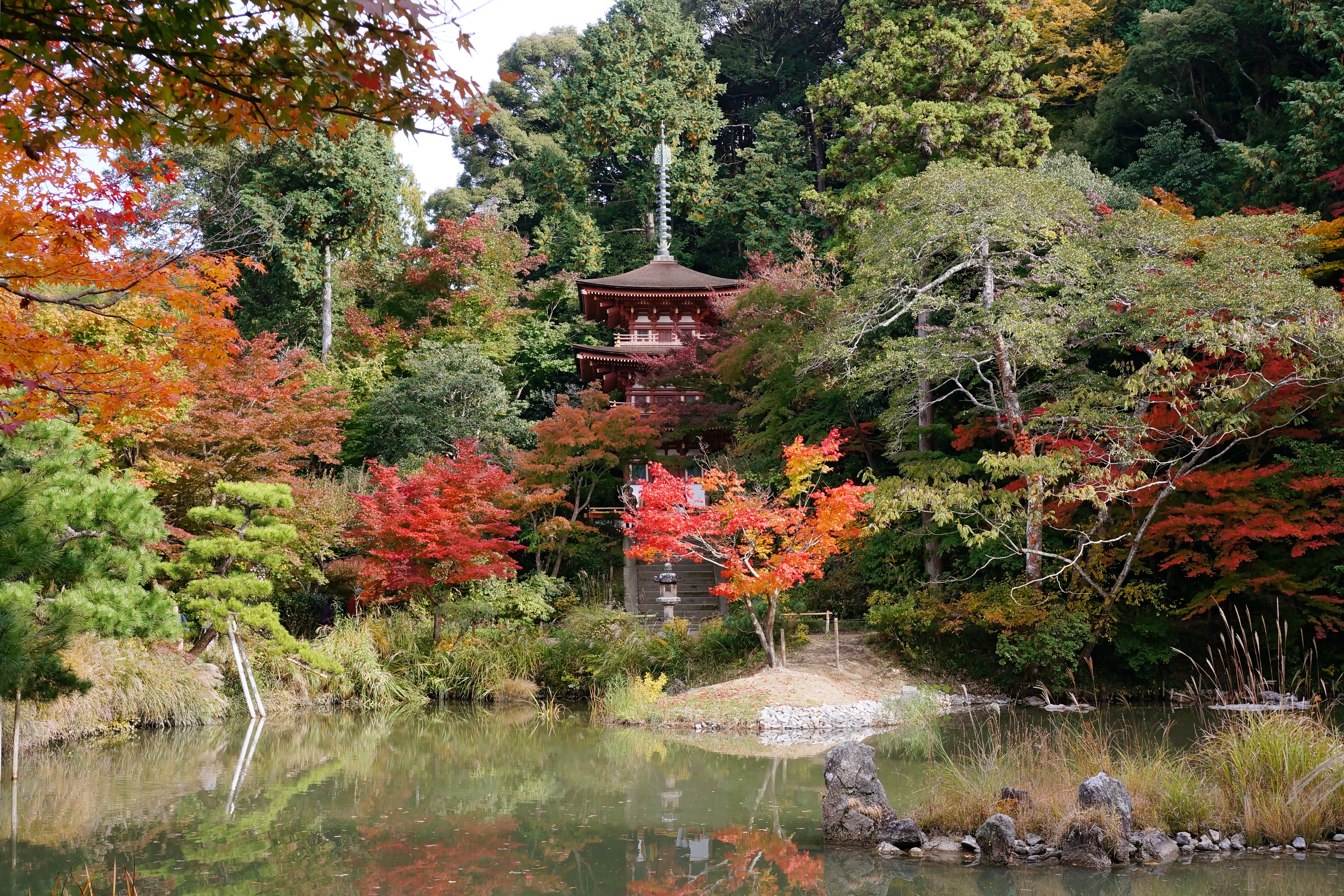
Joruri-ji

Kizugawa (木津川市, Kizugawa-shi) is a city located in southern Kyoto Prefecture, Japan. As of 1 September 2023, the city has an estimated population of 79,866 in 33183 households and a population density of 940 persons per km^{2}. The total area of the city is 85.12 square kilometres (32.87 sq mi).

== Geography ==
Kizugawa City is located on the southern border of Kyoto Prefecture. The city consists of a plain area formed along the curving Kizugawa River in the western part of the city area, gentle hills that form the edge of the plain, and mountains to the north and southeast. In addition, the eastern part of the Kamo district is dotted with enclaves of Kasagi town. It is located approximately 30 to 40 km from the centers of Kyoto City and Osaka City, and approximately 8 km from the center of Nara City.

=== Neighboring municipalities ===
Kyoto Prefecture

- Kyōtanabe
- Sōraku District (Wazuka, Kasagi, Ide)

Nara Prefecture

- Nara

=== Climate ===
Kizugawa has a humid subtropical climate (Köppen Cfa) characterized by warm summers and cool winters with light to no snowfall. The average annual temperature in Kizugawa is 14.3 °C. The average annual rainfall is 1356 mm with September as the wettest month. The temperatures are highest on average in August, at around 26.3 °C, and lowest in January, at around 32.8 °C.

== Demographics ==
Per Japanese census data, the population of Kizugawa has grown in recent decades. In a population estimate released by the Japan Policy Council, Kizugawa City is the only municipality in Kyoto Prefecture predicted to have a positive population growth rate by 2040.

Historical population
Year	Pop.	±%
1940	23,858	—
1950	29,176	+22.3%
1960	28,349	−2.8%
1970	28,007	−1.2%
1980	34,431	+22.9%
1990	49,532	+43.9%
2000	58,809	+18.7%
2010	69,768	+18.6%
2020	77,907	+11.7%

== History ==
The area of Kizukawa was part of ancient Yamashiro Province. During the Nara period, it prospered as a port for transporting lumber as part of the construction of capital cities such as Heijō-kyō. Kuni-kyō, was the capital city of Japan between 740 and 744 under Emperor Shōmu was located in what is now the Kamo neighborhood of Kizukawa.

The village of Kizukawa in Sōraku District, Kyoto, was established on April 1, 1889 with the creation of the modern municipalities system. It was raised to town status on November 22, 1893, and was elevated to city status on March 12, 2007, after merging with the towns of Kamo, Kizu and Yamashiro (all from Sōraku District).

== Government ==
Kizugawa has a mayor-council form of government with a directly elected mayor and a unicameral city council of 20 members. Kizugawa, collectively with the municipalities of Sōraku District contributes two members to the Kyoto Prefectural Assembly. In terms of national politics, the city is part of the Kyoto 6th district of the lower house of the Diet of Japan.

== Economy ==
Kizugawa is a part of the Kansai Science City project and houses research facilities of over 20 enterprises and research facilities including:

- Ataka Daiki Engineering (アタカ大機)
- Fukujyuen (福寿園)
- Kyoto Press Industrial Co. (京都プレス工業)
- M-system (エム・システム)
- Manyo Tools (マンヨーツール)
- Mizuho Co. (株式会社ミズホ)
- Omron (オムロン)
- Rohto Pharmaceutical (ロート製薬)
- Sekisui House (積水ハウス)
- Solno Leaves Co. (ソルノリーブス)
- Tatsuta Electric Wire Cable Co. (タツタ電線)

Other public and private research organizations in Kizugawa City include:

- International Institute for Advanced Studies (IIAS, 国際高等研究所)
- Japan Atomic Energy Agency Kansai Photochemistry Research Center (日本原子力研究開発機構 関西光化学研究所)
- Research Institute of Innovative Technology for the Earth (RITE, 地球環境産業技術研究機構)

== Local attractions ==
Kizugawa City is the home of several famous temples including:

- Gansen-ji (岩船寺): 3-story pagoda listed as an Important Cultural Property
- Jōruri-ji (浄瑠璃寺): Main Hall, main Buddha image, and 3-story pagoda listed as National Treasures
- Kaijyusen-ji (海住山寺): 5-story pagoda listed as a National Treasure
- Kaniman-ji (蟹満寺): main Buddha image listed as a |National Treasure

Other attractions include:

- The Kids' Science Museum of Photons (きっづ光科学館ふぉとん)
- Kuni-kyō Ruins
- Tono Stone Buddha Path (当尾石仏の里)
- Yamashiro Kokubun-ji ruins
- Yamashiro Local History Museum (ふるさとミュージアム山城)

== Education ==
Kizugawa has 13 public elementary schools and five public junior high schools operated by city government and two public high schools operated by the Kyoto Prefectural Board of Education. There is also one private elementary school and one private junior high school. Doshisha University's Gakkentoshi Campus, which focuses on graduate studies in biomedicine, and Doshisha International School, Kyoto (DISK) are also located in Kizugawa.

=== High schools ===
- Kizu High School
- Nanyō High School

=== Junior high schools ===
- Izumigawa Junior High School
- Kizu Junior High School
- Kizu Daini Junior High School
- Kizu Minami Junior High School
- Yamashiro Junior High School

=== Elementary schools ===
- Doshisha International Academy Elementary School
- Kamikoma Elementary School
- Kamo Elementary School
- Kuni Elementary School
- Kunimidai Elementary School
- Kizu Elementary School
- Kizugawadai Elementary School
- Minami Kamodai Elementary School
- Saganaka Elementary School
- Saganakadai Elementary School
- Shiroyamadai Elementary School
- Takanohara Elementary School
- Tanakura Elementary School
- Umemidai Elementary School

== Transportation ==
=== Railways ===
JR West - Kansai Main Line (Yamatoji Line)

- Kamo - Kizu

JR West - Katamachi Line (Gakkentoshi Line)

- Kizu - Nishi-Kizu

JR West - Nara Line

- Tanakura - Kamikoma - Kizu

- Kintetsu Railway Kyoto Line

- Kizugawadai

=== Highways ===
- Keinawa Expressway
- National Route 24
- National Route 163

== Notable people from Kizugawa ==
- Hiroyasu Tanaka, Central League baseball player
- Yui Yokoyama, ex-member of AKB48

== Sister cities ==
- Santa Monica, California, United States, friendship city since 2017
