= Komada =

Komada may refer to:

== Places ==
- Komada Station a passenger railway station located in the town of Seika, Kyoto, Japan

== People ==
- Norihiro Komada (駒田 徳広; born 1962), Japanese Baseball infielder

== Movies ==
- Komada: A Whisky Family (2023) Japanese animated film
