= Shin-Hōsono Station =

Railway station in Seika, Kyoto Prefecture, Japan

Shin-Hōsono Station 新祝園駅
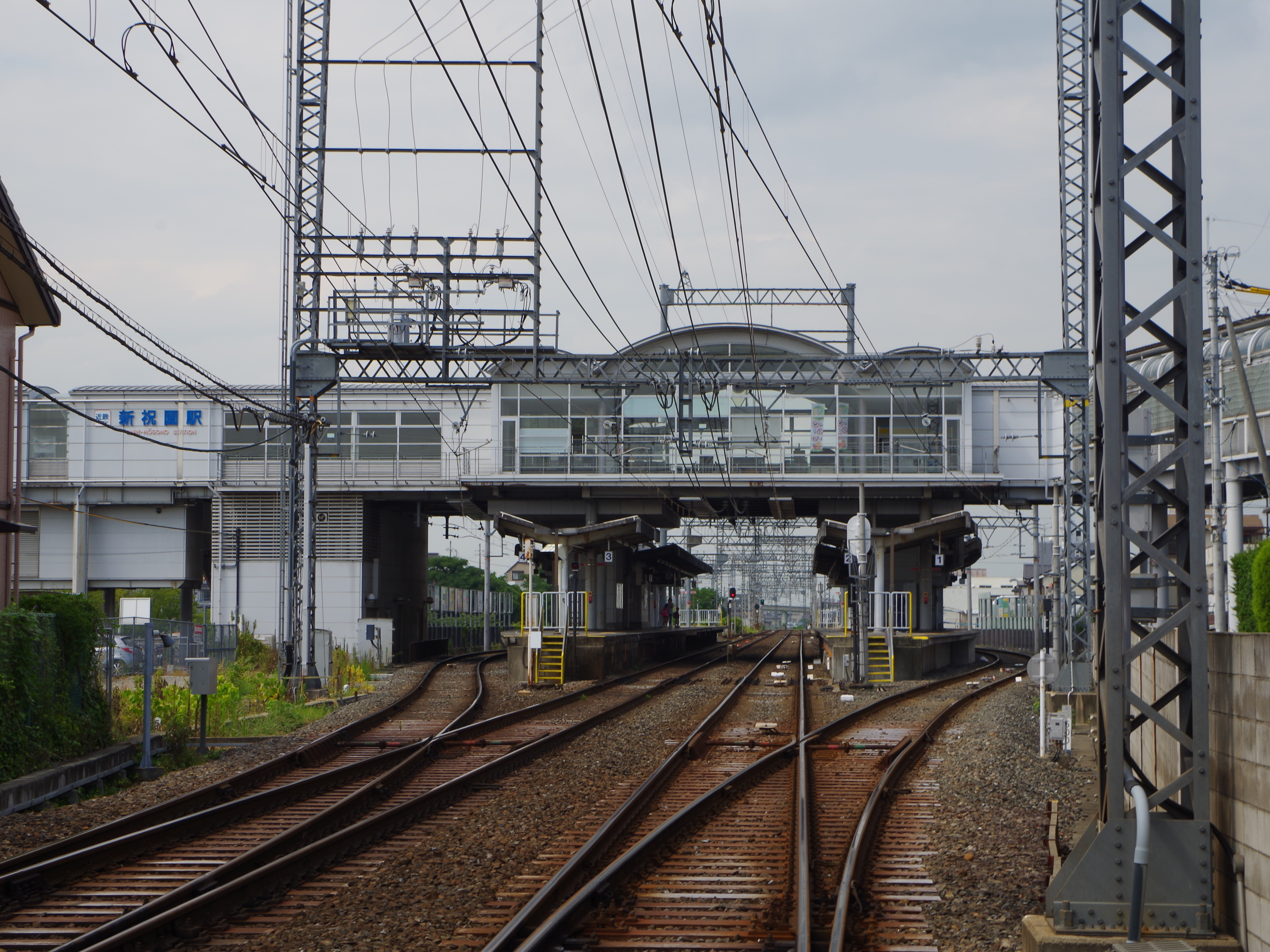
- Shinhōsono station 2013.8.28

General information
- Location: 13-1, Nagatsuka, Hosono, Seika-cho, Soraku-gun, Kyoto-fu 619-0241; Japan
- Coordinates: 34°45′35.69″N 135°47′33.68″E
- System: Kintetsu Railway commuter rail station
- Owner: Kintetsu Railway
- Operator: Kintetsu Railway
- Line: Kyoto/Kashihara Line
- Distance: 26.7 km from Kyoto
- Platforms: 2 island platforms
- Connections: ●Katamachi Line (Gakkentoshi Line) - Hōsono Station

Construction
- Structure type: elevated

Other information
- Station code: B21
- Website: Official website

History
- Opened: 3 November 1928

Passengers
- 2019: 13,276 daily

Services
Preceding station	Kintetsu Railway	Following station
Komada towards Kyōto	Kyoto Line Local	Kizugawadai towards Yamato-Saidaiji
Shin-Tanabe towards Kyōto	Kyoto Line Express	Takanohara towards Yamato-Saidaiji
Location
- Location within Kyoto Prefecture Location within Japan

Shin-Hōsono Station (新祝園駅, Shin-Hōsono-eki) is a passenger railway station located in the town of Seika, Kyoto Prefecture, Japan. It is operated by the private transportation company, Kintetsu Railway. t is station number B21. It is one of the major stations of the Kansai Science City.

== Lines ==
Shin-Hōsono Station is served by the Kyoto Line, and is located 26.7 rail kilometers from the terminus of the line at Kyoto Station. Both express and local trains stop at Shin-Hōsono Station.

== Station layout ==
The station consists of two island platforms, connected by an elevated station building. The station is staffed. An elevated walkway connects the station with the adjacent Hōsono Station on the Katamachi Line (Gakkentoshi Line) of JR West.

=== Platforms ===
1, 2	■ Kintetsu Kyoto Line	for Yamato-Saidaiji, Nara, Tenri, Kashiharajingu-mae
3, 4	■ Kintetsu Kyoto Line	for Shin-Tanabe, Tambabashi, Kyoto and Kyoto Kokusaikaikan

== History ==
Shin-Hōsono Station opened on 3 November 1928 as a station on the Nara Electric Railway. On October 21, 1963, the Nara Electric Railway was absorbed by the Kintetsu Railway. the station was rebuilt with an elevated building in 1994.

== Passenger statistics ==
In fiscal 2022, the station was used by an average of 13,276 passengers daily.

== Surrounding area ==
- Seika Town Hall
- Seika Town Library - A book return post is also installed in front of the ticket gate of this station.
- Seika Town National Health Insurance Hospital
- Seika Town Seika Junior High School
- List of railway stations in Japan
