= Seika, Kyoto =

Seika 精華町
- Town
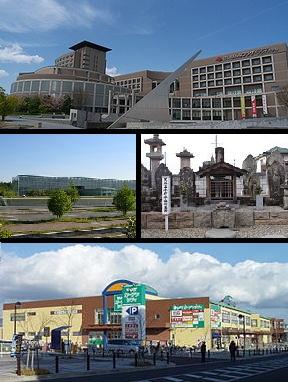

- Flag Chapter
- Location of Seika in Kyoto Prefecture

- Location in Japan
- Coordinates: 34°45′39″N 135°47′09″E
- Country: Japan
- Region: Kansai
- Prefecture: Kyoto
- District: Sōraku

Government
  - Mayor: Masami Sugiura

Area
  - Total: 25.68 km^{2} (9.92 sq mi)

Population
  - Estimate (June, 1, 2026): 35,433
- Time zone: UTC+09:00 (JST)
- City hall address: 70 Kitajiri Minamiinayazuma, Seika-chō, Sōraku-gun, Kyōto-fu 619-0285
- Website: www-e.town.seika.kyoto.jp
- Symbols
- Flower: Rose
- Tree: Live oak

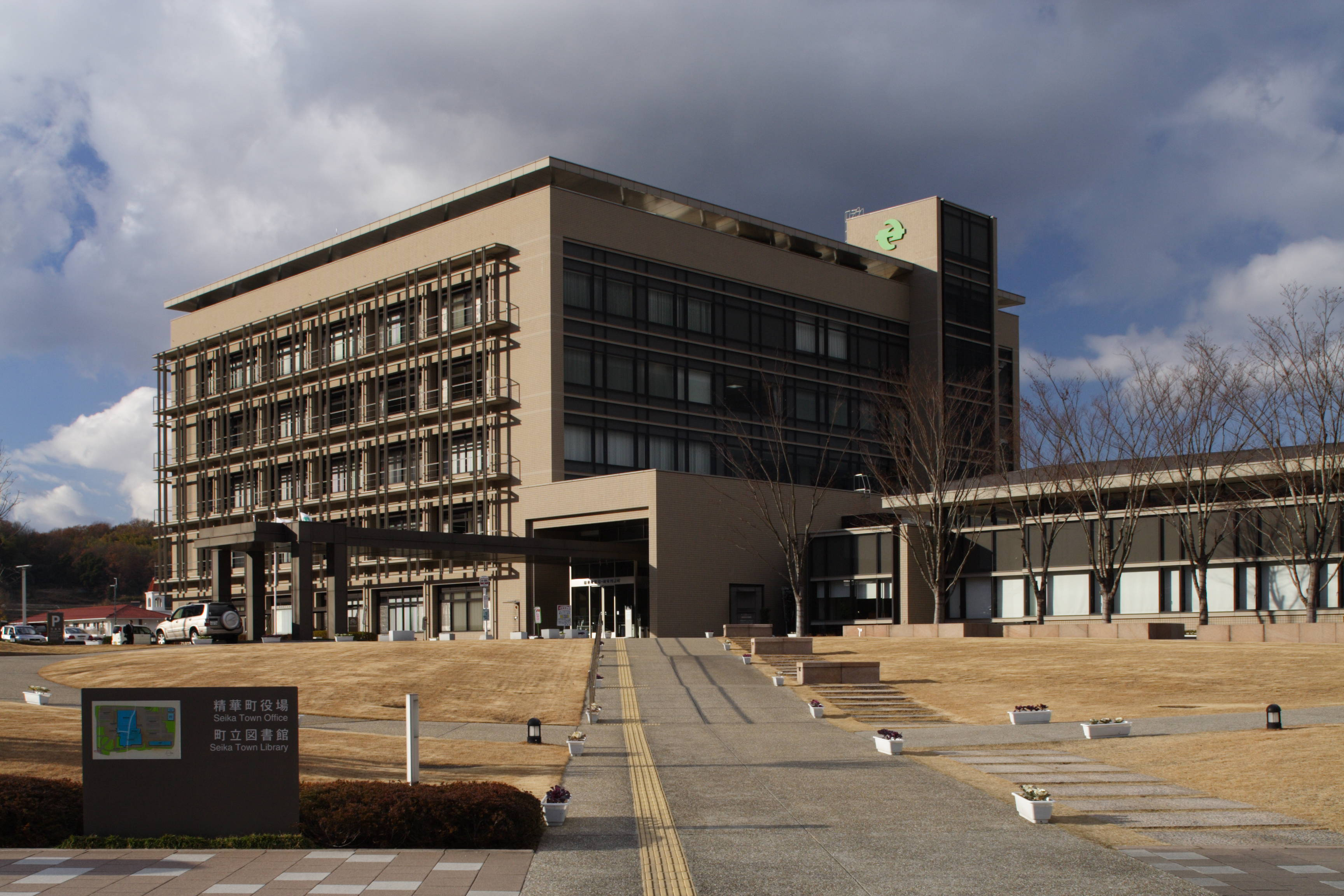
Seika Town Office

Seika (精華町, Seika-chō) is a town located in Sōraku District, Kyoto Prefecture, Japan. As of 1 September 2023 the town has an estimated population of 36,542 in 15,468 households and a population density of 1,400 persons per km^{2}. The total area of the town is 25.68 square kilometres (9.92 sq mi).

== Geography ==
Seika is located at the extreme southwestern tip of Kyoto Prefecture, bordered by the Kizu River to the east and the Keihanna Hills to the west. Due to its position adjacent to the Kizu River, the eastern part of Seika has rich, fertile land ideal for agricultural production. The hilly western and southern parts of Seika, by contrast, are largely residential. Seika's largest peak is Dakeyama (嶽山), at 259.5 meters. It is located on the west side of Seika near the border of Kyotanabe city.

=== Neighboring municipalities ===
Kyoto Prefecture

  - Kizugawa
  - Kyōtanabe

Nara Prefecture

  - Ikoma
  - Nara

=== Neighborhoods ===
- Higashibata (東畑)
- Hikaridai (光台)
- Hishida (菱田)
- Housono (祝園)
- Housono-nishi (祝園西)
- Inuidani (乾谷)
- Kita-inayazuma (北稲八妻)
- Minami-inayazuma (南稲八妻)
- Sakuragaoka (桜が丘)
- Seikadai (精華台)
- Shimokoma (下狛)
- Sugai (菅井)
- Ueda (植田)
- Yamada (山田)
- Zakuro (柘榴)

=== Climate ===
Seika has a humid subtropical climate (Köppen Cfa) characterized by warm summers and cool winters with light to no snowfall. The average annual temperature in Seika is 14.3 °C. The average annual rainfall is 1356 mm with September as the wettest month. The temperatures are highest on average in August, at around 26.3 °C, and lowest in January, at around 2.8 °C.

== Demographics ==
Per Japanese census data, the population of Seika has increased in recent decades.

Historical population
Year	Pop.	±%
1940	8,165	—
1950	9,490	+16.2%
1960	9,373	−1.2%
1970	10,929	+16.6%
1980	15,334	+40.3%
1990	17,519	+14.2%
2000	26,357	+50.4%
2010	35,633	+35.2%
2020	36,198	+1.6%

== History ==
The area of Seika was part of ancient Yamashiro Province. Archaeological records indicate that people have inhabited modern-day Seika since at least the Yayoi period. Seika is home to Inayazuma Castle, where part of the Yamashiro Riots of 1485 took place. The area around Seika has historically been considered a cultural corridor between the two ancient capitals of Kyoto and Nara. The villages of Komada, Hosono and Inada were established on April 1, 1889, with the creation of the modern municipalities system. These three villages merged on October 10, 1931, to form the village of Kawanishi. On April 1, 1951, Kawanishi merged with the village of Yamadaso to form the village of Seika. Seika was elevated to town status on April 1, 1955.

Beginning in the 1960s, Seika has experienced rapid growth as commuters to Kyoto, Osaka and Nara move into the town. The town's population tripled in the span of 35 years, growing from 10,929 people in 1970 to 34,236 people in 2005. According to the 2005 census, Seika is the fastest-growing municipality in Japan.

== Government ==
Seika has a mayor-council form of government with a directly elected mayor and a unicameral town council of 21 members. Seika, collectively with the other municipalities of Sōraku District and the city of Kizugawa, contributes two members to the Kyoto Prefectural Assembly. In terms of national politics, the town is part of the Kyoto 6th district of the lower house of the Diet of Japan.

== Economy ==
Seika has a mixed economy. Although largely agriculturally based, has in recent years become the center of a national project, the Kansai Science City, and has been referred to as the "New Culture Capital" of Japan. Nippon Telegraph and Telephone Corporation (NTT), Matsushita Electric, Kyocera and many other companies have facilities in the town.The town is home to the Kansai-kan of the National Diet Library.

=== Agriculture ===
While strawberries are Seika's most famous product, the town is also known for its shrimp taro and green chili peppers.

=== Industry ===
The presence of the Kansai Science City makes research and technology core components of Seika's economy. Currently the following companies have facilities in Seika:

- Advanced Telecommunications Research Institute International
- Kyocera
- NICT National Institute of Information and Communications Technology
- Nidec
- NTT West
- Panasonic
- Shimadzu Corp.

=== Locally based companies ===
In addition to the companies with facilities in Seika, companies headquartered in Seika include:

- Activelink
- Silex.
- Takako

== Education ==
=== Postsecondary ===
- Kyoto Prefectural University, Seika Campus

=== Primary and secondary ===
Seika has five public elementary school and three public junior high schools operated by the town government and one private high school. The prefecture operates one special education school for the handicapped.

- Higashihikari Elementary School
- Kawanishi Elementary School
- Kyoto Kōgakkan High School
- Minamiyamashiro Special Education High School
- Seihoku Elementary School
- Seika Junior High School
- Seika Minami Junior High School
- Seika Nishi Junior High School
- Seikadai Elementary School
- Yamadasho Elementary school

== Transportation ==
=== Railways ===
JR West - Katamachi Line (Gakkentoshi Line)

- Hōsono - Shimokoma

- Kintetsu Railway Kyoto Line

- Komada - Shin-Hōsono - <Kizugawadai> - Yamadagawa

=== Highways ===
- Keinawa Expressway
- National Route 24
- National Route 163

== International relations ==
Seika is twinned with:

- Norman, United States, since 2005

== Local attractions ==
Seika is home to Keihanna Plaza, a large building in the Kansai Science City boasting an auditorium and other facilities, as well as a large sundial known for projecting lasers into the sky at night. Keihanna Commemorative Park, which includes a large botanical garden, can also be found in the town. Additionally, the Kansai branch of the Diet Library is located in Seika.

Seika is home to several large festivals held annually. The Strawberry Hunt Festival is famous and has many visitors. Another well-known event is the Igomori Festival, which dates back to 770 A.D. and features a large, blazing torch being carried through the darkness of the night. Seika's main event is the Seika Festival, a large fair held every November featuring a large variety of different booths and performances, among other attractions.

Several notable temples and shrines are located in Seika. These include Hosono Shrine, where the Igomori Festival takes place, and Raiko-ji Temple, where the protagonists of Chikamatsu Monzaemon's play Love Suicides on the Eve of the Koshin Festival are buried.

== Notable people from Seika ==
- Misato Watanabe, singer
