= Yamadagawa Station =

Railway station in Seika, Kyoto Prefecture, Japan

Yamadagawa Station 山田川駅
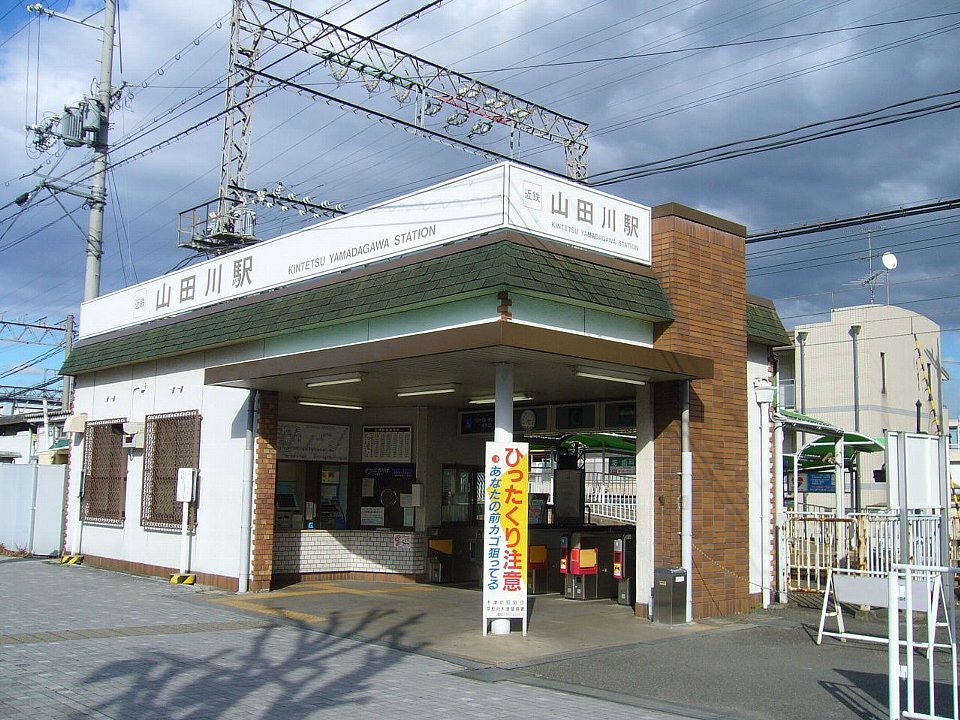
- Yamadagawa Station, March 2007

General information
- Location: 3-1, Ōaza Yamada Koaza Shimokawara, Seika-cho, Soraku-gun, Kyoto-fu; Japan
- Coordinates: 34°44′15″N 135°47′37″E
- System: Kintetsu Railway commuter rail station
- Owner: Kintetsu Railway
- Operator: Kintetsu Railway
- Line: Kyoto/Kashihara Line
- Distance: 29.2 km from Kyoto
- Platforms: 2 side platforms
- Connections: Bus stop

Other information
- Station code: B23
- Website: Official website

History
- Opened: 3 November 1928

Passengers
- 2019: 4280 daily

Services
Preceding station	Kintetsu Railway	Following station
Kizugawadai towards Kyōto	Kyoto Line Local	Takanohara towards Yamato-Saidaiji
Location
- Location within Kyoto Prefecture Location within Japan

Yamadagawa Station (山田川駅, Yamadagawa-eki) is a passenger railway station located in the town of Seika, Kyoto, Japan, operated by the private transportation company, Kintetsu Railway.It is station number B23.

== Lines ==
Yamadagawa Station is served by the Yamada Line, and is located 29.2 rail kilometers from the terminus of the line at Kyoto Station.

== Station layout ==
The station consists of two opposed side platforms, connected by a level crossing. The station building is located on platform 2 on the west side of the station. The station is unattended.

=== Platforms ===
1	■ Kyoto Line	For Tenri, and Kashiharajingu-mae
2	■ Kyoto Line	For Kyoto

== History ==
Yamadagawa Station opened on 3 November 1928 as a station on the Nara Electric Railway. On October 21, 1963, the Nara Electric Railway was absorbed by the Kintetsu Railway.

== Passenger statistics ==
In fiscal 2019, the station was used by an average of 4280 passengers daily.

== Surrounding area ==
- Japan National Route 163
- Doshisha Kokusai Gakuin Elementary School

== See also ==
- List of railway stations in Japan
