= Shimokoma Station =

Railway station in Seika, Kyoto Prefecture, Japan

Coordinates: 34°46′49.92″N 135°47′18.55″E

Shimokoma Station 下狛駅
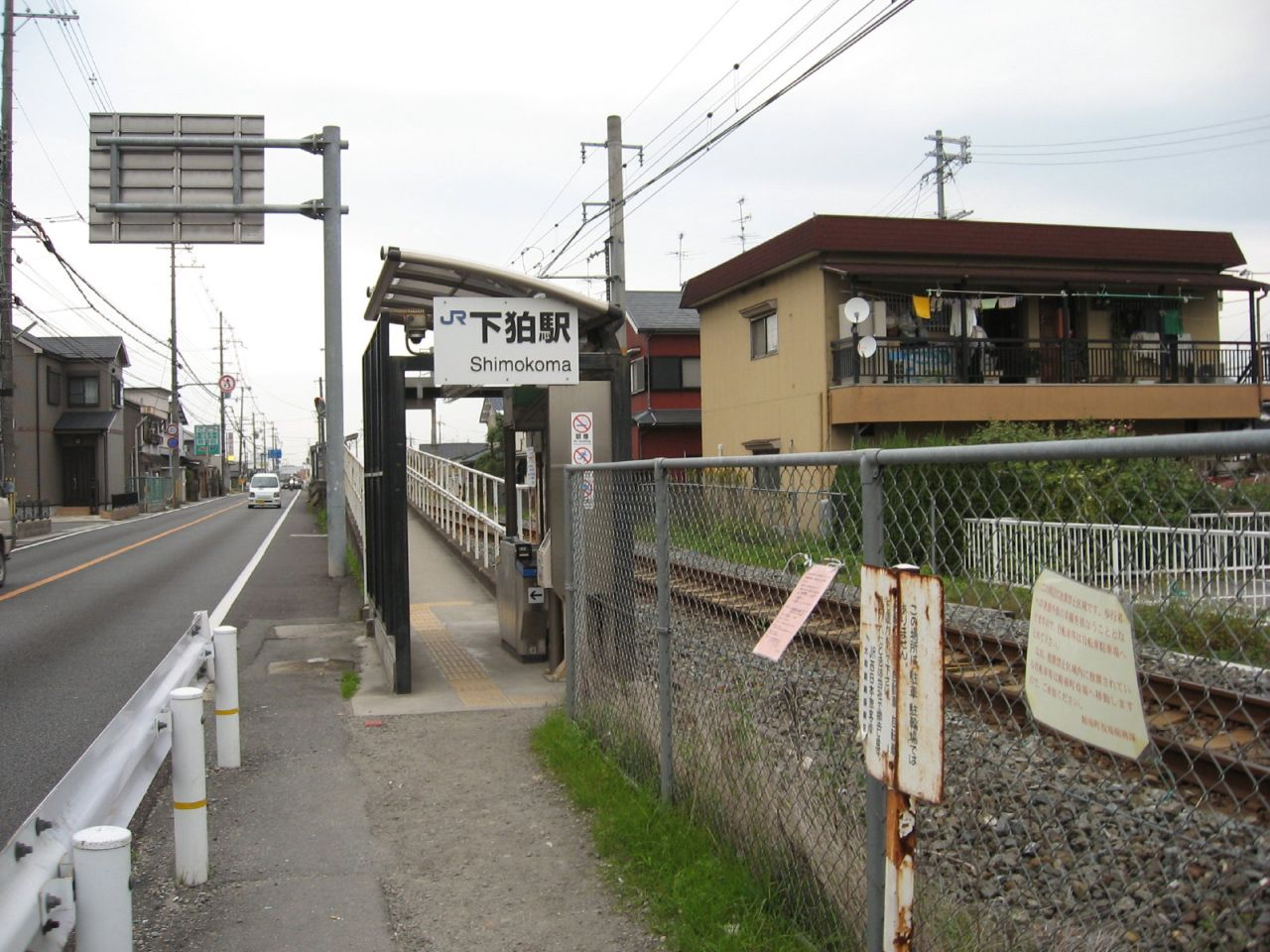
- Shimokoma Station, October 2006

General information
- Location: Shimoshinjo Shimokoma, Seika-cho, Soraku-gun, Kyoto-fu 619-0245; Japan
- Operator: JR West
- Line: H Katamachi Line
- Distance: 7.4 km (4.6 miles) from Kizu
- Platforms: 1 side platform
- Tracks: 1
- Connections: Bus terminal

Construction
- Structure type: Ground level

Other information
- Station code: JR-H21
- Website: Official website

History
- Opened: 1 December 1952

Passengers
- FY 2023: 968 daily
Location
- Location within Kyoto Prefecture Location within Japan

Shimokoma Station (下狛駅, Shimokoma-eki) is a passenger railway station located in the town of Seika, Kyoto, Japan. There is a transfer at this station to the nearby Komada Station on the Kintetsu Kyoto Line.

== Lines ==
Shimokoma Station is served by the Katamachi Line (Gakkentoshi Line), and is located at 7.4 km (4.6 miles) from the terminus of the line at Kizu.

== Layout ==
The station has one side platform serving a single bi-directional track.

== Stations next to Shimokoma ==
«	Service	»
Katamachi Line (Gakkentoshi Line)
Hōsono	Rapid Service	JR Miyamaki
Hōsono	Regional Rapid Service	JR Miyamaki
Hōsono	Local	JR Miyamaki

== History ==
Shimokoma Station opened on 1 December 1952. With the privatization of Japanese National Railways (JNR) on 1 April 1987, the station came under the control of JR West. Station numbering was introduced in March 2018 with Shimokoma being assigned station number JR-H21.

== Passenger statistics ==
In fiscal 2019, the station was used by an average of 456 passengers daily.

== Surrounding area ==
- Komada Station - Kintetsu Kyoto Line
- Kyoto Kogakukan High School
- Kyoto Prefectural University Seika Campus

== See also ==
- List of railway stations in Japan
