= Kintetsu Miyazu Station =

Railway station in Kyōtanabe, Kyoto Prefecture, Japan

Kintetsu Miyazu Station 近鉄宮津駅
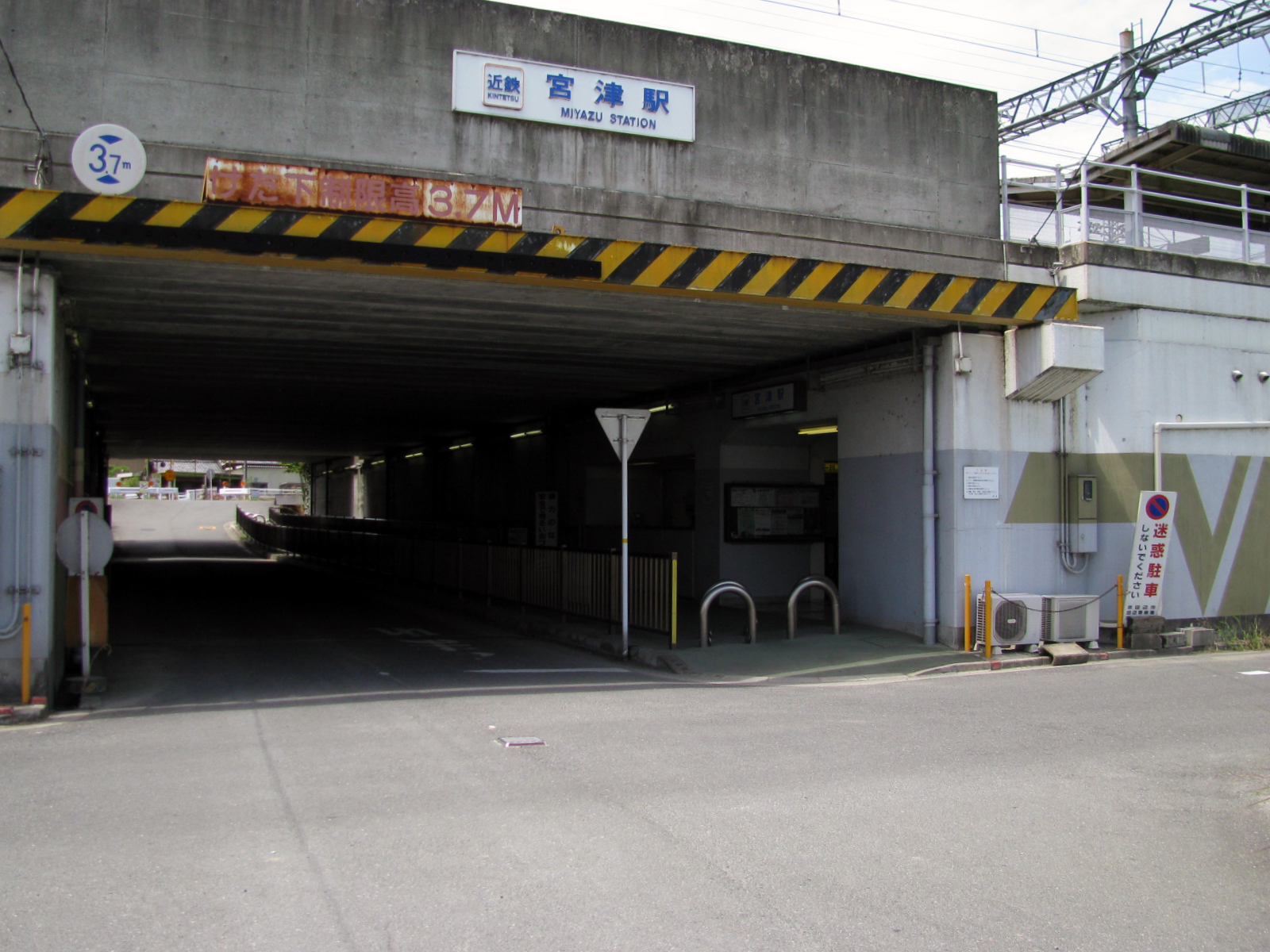
- Entrance of Kintetsu Miyazu Station

General information
- Location: Miyazu Haizaki, Kyōtanabe-shi, Kyoto-fu 610-0314; Japan
- Coordinates: 34°47′29.23″N 135°47′14.85″E
- System: Kintetsu Railway commuter rail station
- Owner: Kintetsu Railway
- Operator: Kintetsu Railway
- Line: Kyoto/Kashihara Line
- Distance: 23.1 km from Kyoto
- Platforms: 1 island platform
- Connections: Bus terminal

Other information
- Station code: B19
- Website: Official website

History
- Opened: 18 March 1983

Passengers
- FY2019: 448 daily

Services
| Preceding station | Kintetsu Railway | Following station |
|---|---|---|
| Miyamaki towards Kyōto | Kyoto Line Local | Komada towards Yamato-Saidaiji |
| Miyamaki towards Kyōto | Kyoto Line Express (Terminating at Miyazu) | Terminus |
Location
- Location within Kyoto Prefecture Location within Japan

Kintetsu-Miyazu Station (近鉄宮津駅, Kintetsu-Miyazu-eki) is a passenger railway station located in the city of Kyōtanabe, Kyoto, Japan, operated by the private transportation company, Kintetsu Railway. It is station number B19.

== Lines ==
Kintetsu-Miyazu Station is served by the Kyoto Line, and is located 23.1 rail kilometers from the terminus of the line at Kyoto Station.

== Station layout ==
The station consists of one island platform with two tracks between two passing tracks, located on an embankment, with the station building underneath.

=== Platforms ===
| 2 | ■ Kintetsu Kyoto Line | For Tenri, and Kashiharajingu-mae |
| 3 | ■ Kintetsu Kyoto Line | For Kyoto |

== History ==
Kintetsu Miyazu Station opened on 18 March 1983 as Miyamaki Signal Box to serve the new Miyazu Train Yard. It was upgraded to full passenger station status on 21 September 1993.

== Passenger statistics ==
In fiscal 2019, the station was used by an average of 448 passengers daily.

== Surrounding area ==
- Saidaiji Inspection Area Miyazu Train Yard
- Kyotanabe City Miyamaki Elementary School

== See also ==
- List of railway stations in Japan
