= Kansai-kan of the National Diet Library =

Library in Kansai Science City, Japan

Coordinates: 34°44′36″N 135°46′12″E

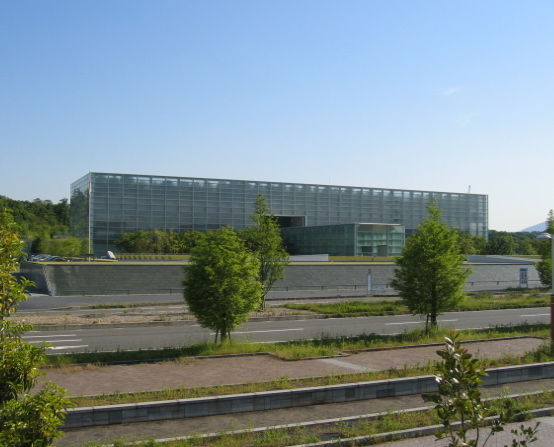
Kansai-kan

Kansai-kan of the National Diet Library (国立国会図書館関西館, Kokuritsu Kokkai Toshokan Kansai-kan) is the facility of the National Diet Library, opened in October, 2002. It is based at the Kansai Science City in Seika Town, Soraku District, Kyoto Prefecture.

In 1978, a first basic concept of Kansai-kan of the NDL was shown as the "Second National Diet Library" by local governments, academic societies and businesses in Kansai region. National Diet Library officially launched the Research Committee for the Kansai Project of the National Diet Library (NDL) in 1982. And the second library was renamed as the Kansai-kan(the present name) in 1987.
