= Santen Pharmaceutical =

Japanese pharmaceutical company

Santen Pharmaceutical Co., Ltd.

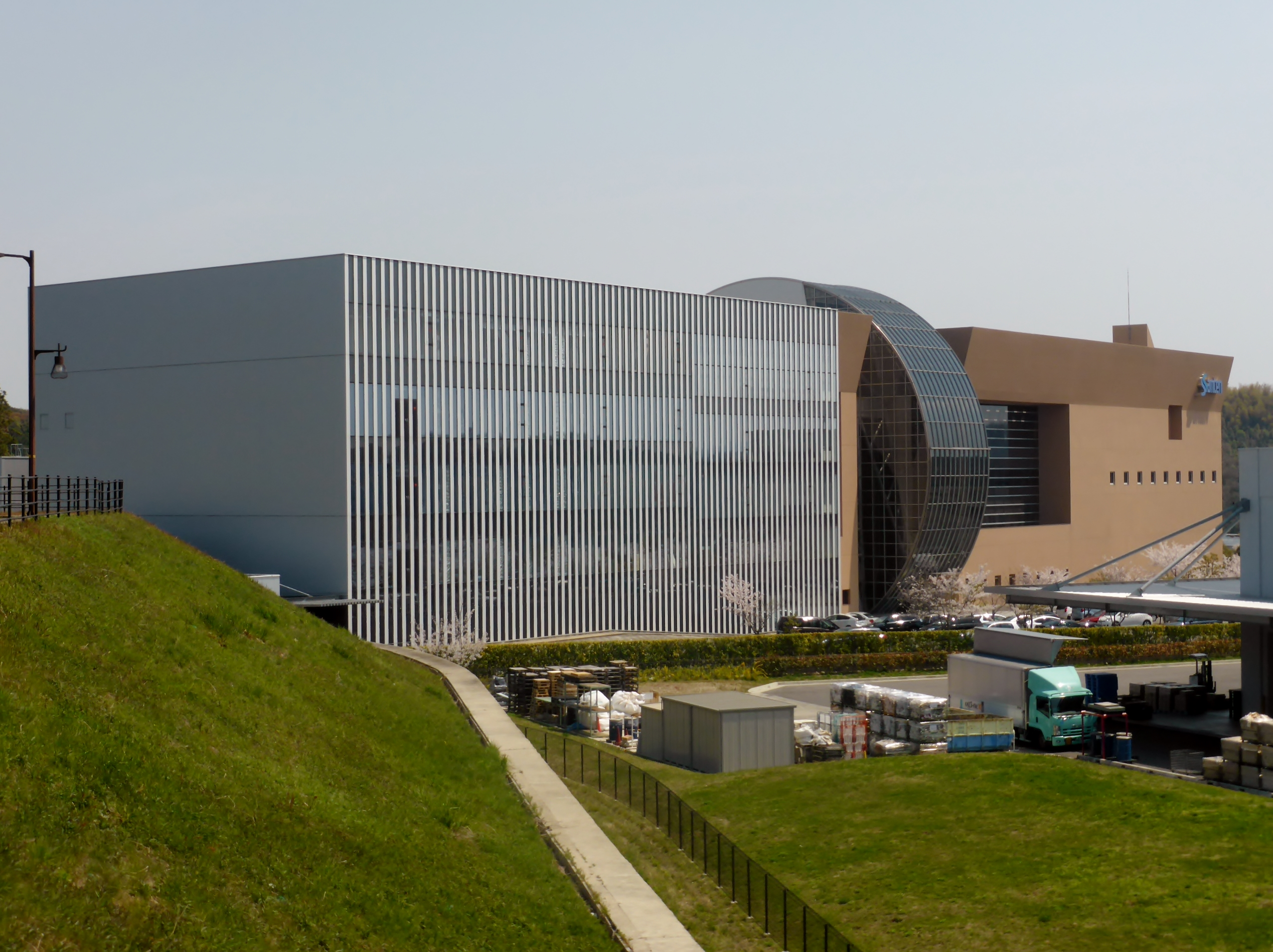
- The company's Research and Development Center in Ikoma, Nara
- Native name: 参天製薬株式会社
- Company type: Public KK
- Traded as: TYO: 4536; OSE: 4536
- Industry: Pharmaceutical
- Founded: Osaka, Japan (1890)
- Founder: Kenkichi Taguchi
- Headquarters: Grand Front Osaka Tower A, 4-20 Ofuka-cho, Kita-ku, Osaka 530-8552, Japan
- Key people: Akira Kurokawa, (CEO and President)
- Products: Pharmaceuticals; Medical devices
- Revenue: $ 2.429 billion (FY 2018) (¥ 243.0 billion) (FY 2018)
- Net income: $ 175.661 million (FY 2012) (¥ 16.521 billion) (FY 2012)
- Number of employees: 3,805(consolidated) (as of March 31, 2018)
- Website: Official website

Santen Pharmaceutical Co., Ltd. (参天製薬株式会社, Santen Seiyaku Kabushiki-gaisha), is a Japanese pharmaceutical company, specializing in ophthalmology. With its ophthalmic products Santen holds the top share within the Japanese market and is one of the leading ophthalmic companies worldwide, with its products being sold in over 50 countries.

The company was founded in 1890 by Kenkichi Taguchi, as Taguchi Santendo, and in 1925, Santendo Co., Ltd. was established. In 2014 Santen announced that it has entered into an agreement with Merck & Co. to purchase Merck's ophthalmology products.

== Business locations ==
Santen has 3 plants located in Hōdatsushimizu, Ishikawa, in Tampere and in Suzhou, 21 subsidiary companies located in Japan, the US, the Netherlands, Finland, United Kingdom & Ireland, Spain, Switzerland, Italy, France, Germany, Sweden, China, South Korea, Taiwan, India, Thailand, Malaysia, the Philippines and Singapore. Its R&D center is located in Ikoma, Nara.
