= Komada Station =

Railway station in Seika, Kyoto Prefecture, Japan

Komada Station 狛田駅
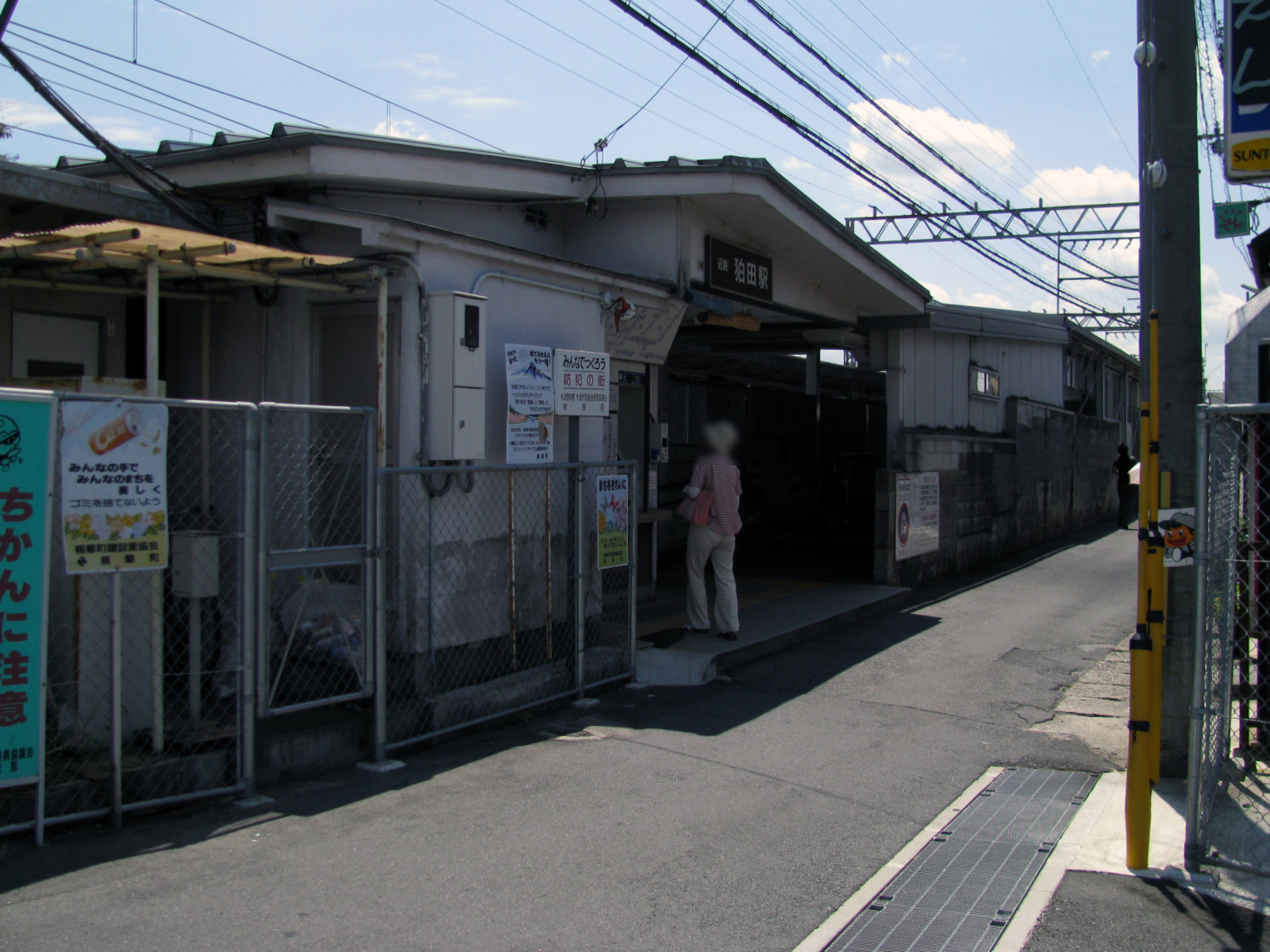
- Komada Station

General information
- Location: 1-chome Komada, Seika-cho, Soraku-gun, Kyoto-fu 619-0247; Japan
- Coordinates: 34°46′50.37″N 135°47′21.76″E
- System: Kintetsu Railway commuter rail station
- Owner: Kintetsu Railway
- Operator: Kintetsu Railway
- Line: Kyoto/Kashihara Line
- Distance: 24.4 km from Kyoto
- Platforms: 2 side platforms

Other information
- Station code: B20
- Website: Official website

History
- Opened: 3 November 1928

Passengers
- FY 2019: 1500 daily (boarding)

Services
Preceding station	Kintetsu Railway	Following station
Kintetsu-Miyazu towards Kyōto	Kyoto Line Local	Shin-Hōsono towards Yamato-Saidaiji
Location
- Location within Kyoto Prefecture Location within Japan

Komada Station (狛田駅, Komada-eki) is a passenger railway station located in the town of Seika, Kyoto, Japan, operated by the private railway operator Kintetsu Railway.It is station number B20.

== Lines ==
Komada Station is served by the Kyoto Line, and is located 24.4 rail kilometers from the terminus of the line at Kyoto Station.

== Station layout ==
The station consists of two opposed side platforms, connected by an underground passage. The effective platform length is up to four-car trains, and the six-car Karasuma Line train bound for Takanohara from Kokusai Kaikan, which was operated as a special train in 1997, passed through this station because it did not meet the platform effective length. The ticket gates are located on both the north and south sides of Platform 2. Station staff are stationed at the north side only. On the south side, only automatic ticket gates are installed. An additional exit is provided on weekday mornings for Kyoto Kogakkan High School students on the south side of the southbound platform, and is also opened at other times for wheelchair users.

=== Platforms ===
1	■ Kintetsu Kyoto Line	for Yamato-Saidaiji, Nara, Tenri, and Kashiharajingu-mae
2	■ Kintetsu Kyoto Line	for Shin-Tanabe, Tambabashi, and Kyoto

== History ==
The station opened on 3 November 1928, as a station on the Nara Electric Railroad. In 1963, the NER merged with Kintetsu.

== Passenger statistics ==
In fiscal 2019, the station was used by an average of 1500 passengers daily (boarding passengers only).

== Surrounding area ==
- Shimokoma Station (JR West Gakkentoshi Line)
- Kyoto Kogakkan High School

== See also ==
- List of railway stations in Japan
