= Kansai Science City =

Keihanna Science City 関西文化学術研究都市 けいはんな学研都市
- Planned community
- Kansai Science City
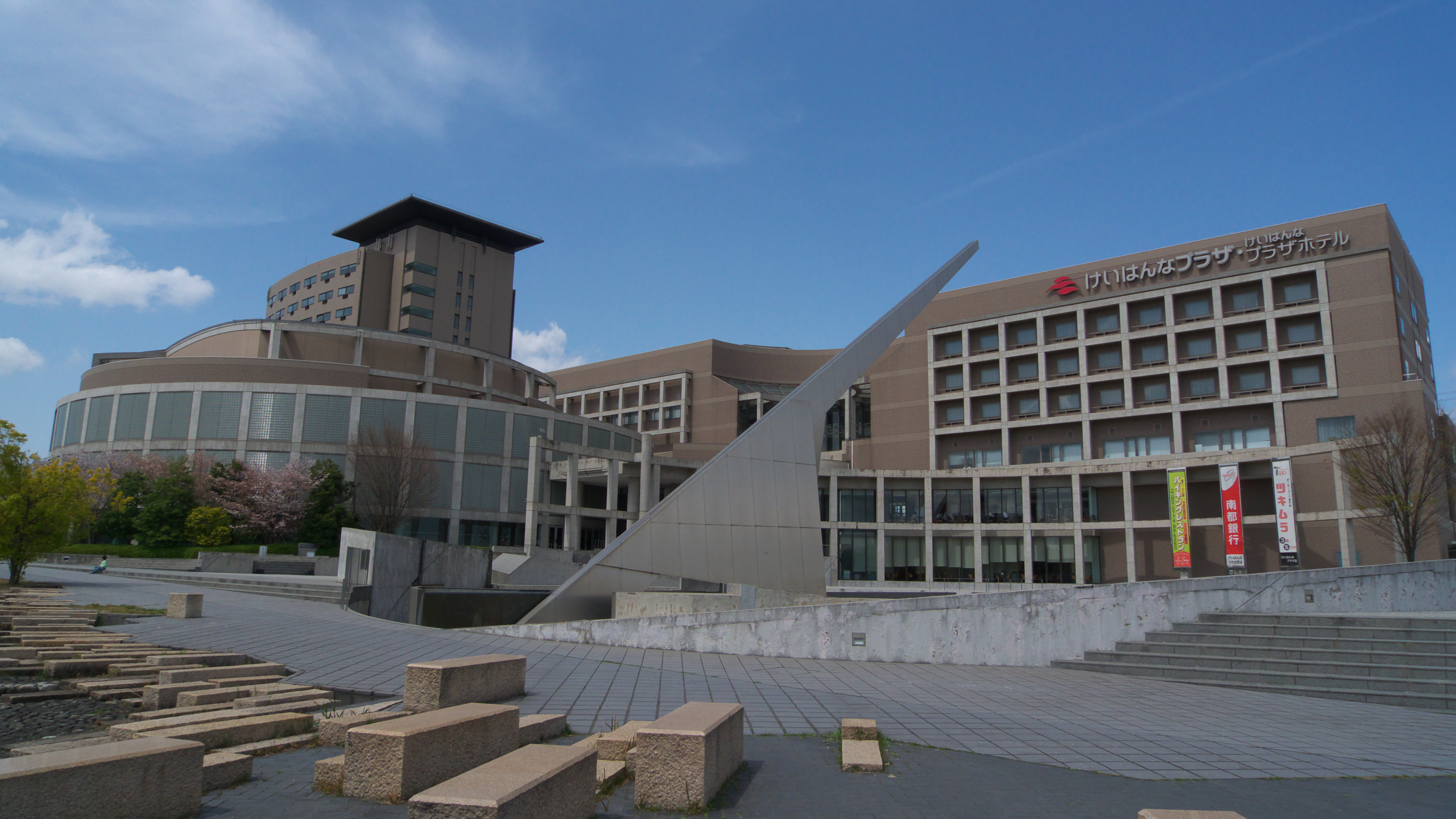
- Keihanna Plaza in Seika
- Interactive map of Keihanna Science City
- Coordinates: 34°44′42″N 135°45′54″E
- Country: Japan
- Region: Kansai
- Prefectures: Kyoto Prefecture; Osaka Prefecture; Nara Prefecture
- Opened: October 1994
- Founder: Azuma Okuda

Area
  - Total: 154.12 km^{2} (59.51 sq mi)

Population (April 1, 2021)
  - Total: 253,729
  - Density: 1,646.3/km^{2} (4,263.9/sq mi)
- Time zone: UTC+9 (JST)
- Website: www.kri.or.jp/en/

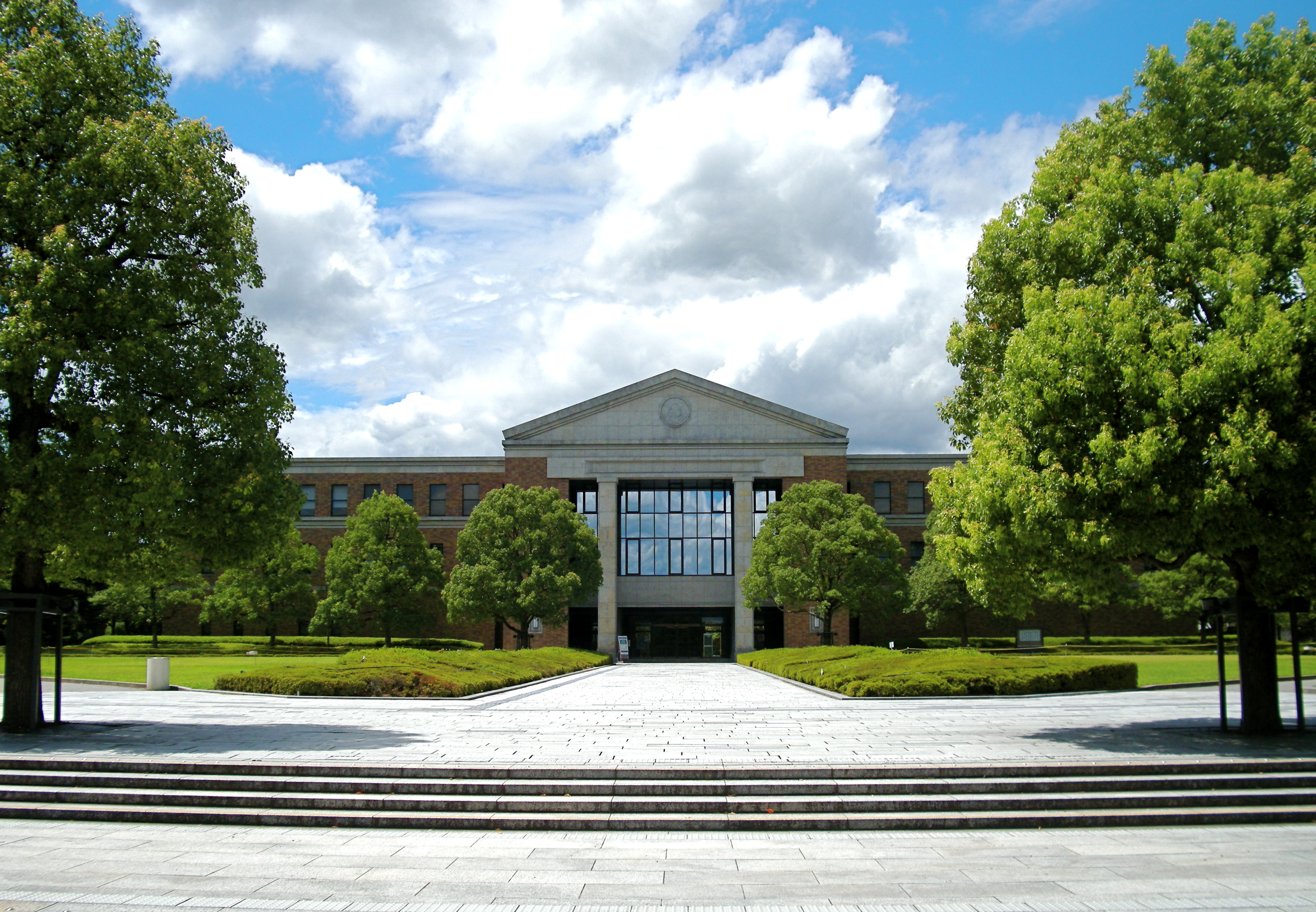
Doshisha University in Kyōtanabe

Kansai Science City (関西文化学術研究都市, Kansai Bunka-gakujutsu-kenkyū-toshi) is an unincorporated city located in the Keihanna Hills (京阪奈丘陵, Keihanna kyūryō), a border region between Kyoto, Osaka, and Nara Prefectures in Kansai region, Japan. The name is commonly shortened (Note: The Japanese form of the official name, which literally translates to Kansai Culture and Academic Research City, is substantially longer than the official English name.) to Keihanna Science City (けいはんな学研都市, Keihanna Gakken-toshi) or Gakken-toshi (学研都市). The name Keihanna is constructed by extracting a representative kanji from Kyoto, Osaka, and Nara. It is about 25 kilometers (16 mi) south of the city of Kyoto and 30 kilometers (19 mi) east of the city of Osaka. The city was constructed to help the advancement of creative arts, sciences, and research, as well as to spur the creation of new industries and cultures.

== Location ==
Historical population
Year	Pop.	±%
1986	128,278	—
1991	171,805	+33.9%
1996	194,514	+13.2%
2001	212,826	+9.4%
2006	228,425	+7.3%
2011	241,020	+5.5%
2016	248,435	+3.1%
2021	253,729	+2.1%

Kansai Science City is located in portions of the following eight cities (市, shi) and towns (町, chō), in three prefectures:

- Osaka Prefecture
  - Hirakata (枚方市, Hirakata-shi)
  - Katano (交野市, Katano-shi)
  - Shijōnawate (四條畷市, Shijōnawate-shi)
- Kyoto Prefecture
  - Kyōtanabe (京田辺市, Kyōtanabe-shi)
  - Kizugawa (木津川市, Kizugawa-shi)
  - Sōraku District (相楽郡, Sōraku-gun)
    - Seika (精華町, Seika-chō)
- Nara Prefecture
  - Nara (奈良市, Nara-shi)
  - Ikoma (生駒市, Ikoma-shi)

Out of these, Seika in Kyoto Prefecture is completely inside the Kansai Science City.

The overall area of the Kansai Science City is 154 square kilometers (59 mi^{2}), with an estimated population of 250,000. There are 12 "Cultural and Academic Research Zones" within the Kansai Science City, encompassing 33 square kilometers (13 mi^{2}), with an estimated population of 100,000. Seika & Nishikizu is the central district of this city. Fugenji and Kita-Tawara are science districts in land use adjustment.

Areas, populations, and zones as of 1 April 2021
Jurisdiction	Osaka Prefecture			Kyoto Prefecture			Nara Prefecture		Total
Jurisdiction	Hirakata	Shijōnawate	Katano	Kyōtanabe	Seika	Kizugawa	Nara	Ikoma	Total
Area	15.10 km^{2}	14.70 km^{2}	15.50 km^{2}	24.42 km^{2}	25.68 km^{2}	23.62 km^{2}	14.60 km^{2}	20.50 km^{2}	154.12 km^{2}
Population	33,244	11,382	14,515	22,126	58,079	37,024	52,403	24,956	253,729
Cultural and Academic Research Zone	Himuro & Tsuda (0.74 km^{2})				Seika & Nishikizu (5.06 km^{2})			Takayama (3.33 km^{2})	(33.29 km^{2}); Population : 100,261
Cultural and Academic Research Zone		Kiyotaki & Muroike (3.40 km^{2})			Heijo & Soraku (6.26 km^{2})				(33.29 km^{2}); Population : 100,261
Cultural and Academic Research Zone				Tanabe (1.00 km^{2})		Kizu (7.37 km^{2})			(33.29 km^{2}); Population : 100,261
Cultural and Academic Research Zone				Minamitanabe & Komada (3.44 km^{2})			Heijo Palace Site (1.42 km^{2})		(33.29 km^{2}); Population : 100,261
Cultural and Academic Research Zone		Tawara (1.27 km^{2})		Fugenji				Kita-Tawara	(33.29 km^{2}); Population : 100,261

Aerial photographs

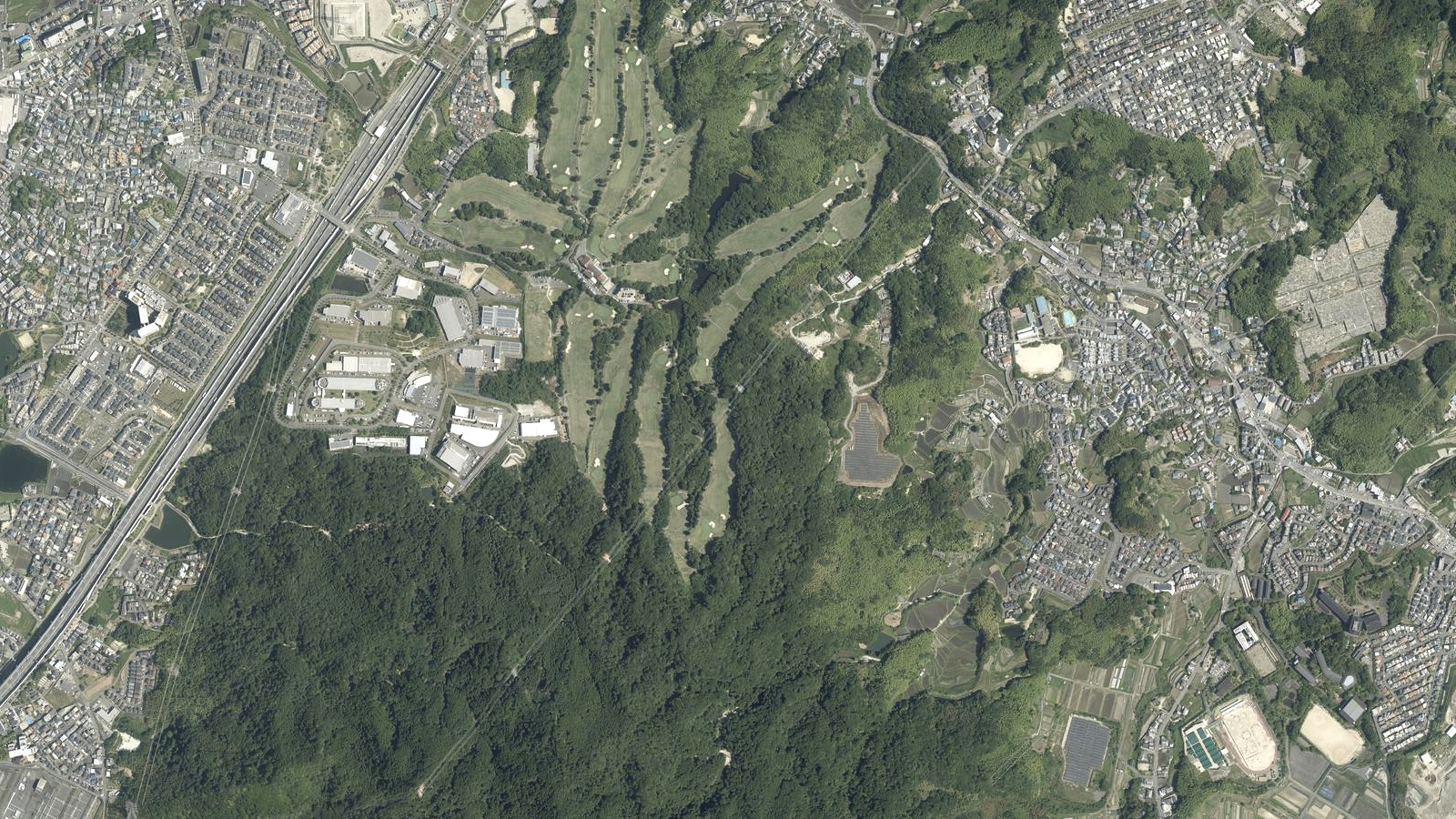
Himuro & Tsuda

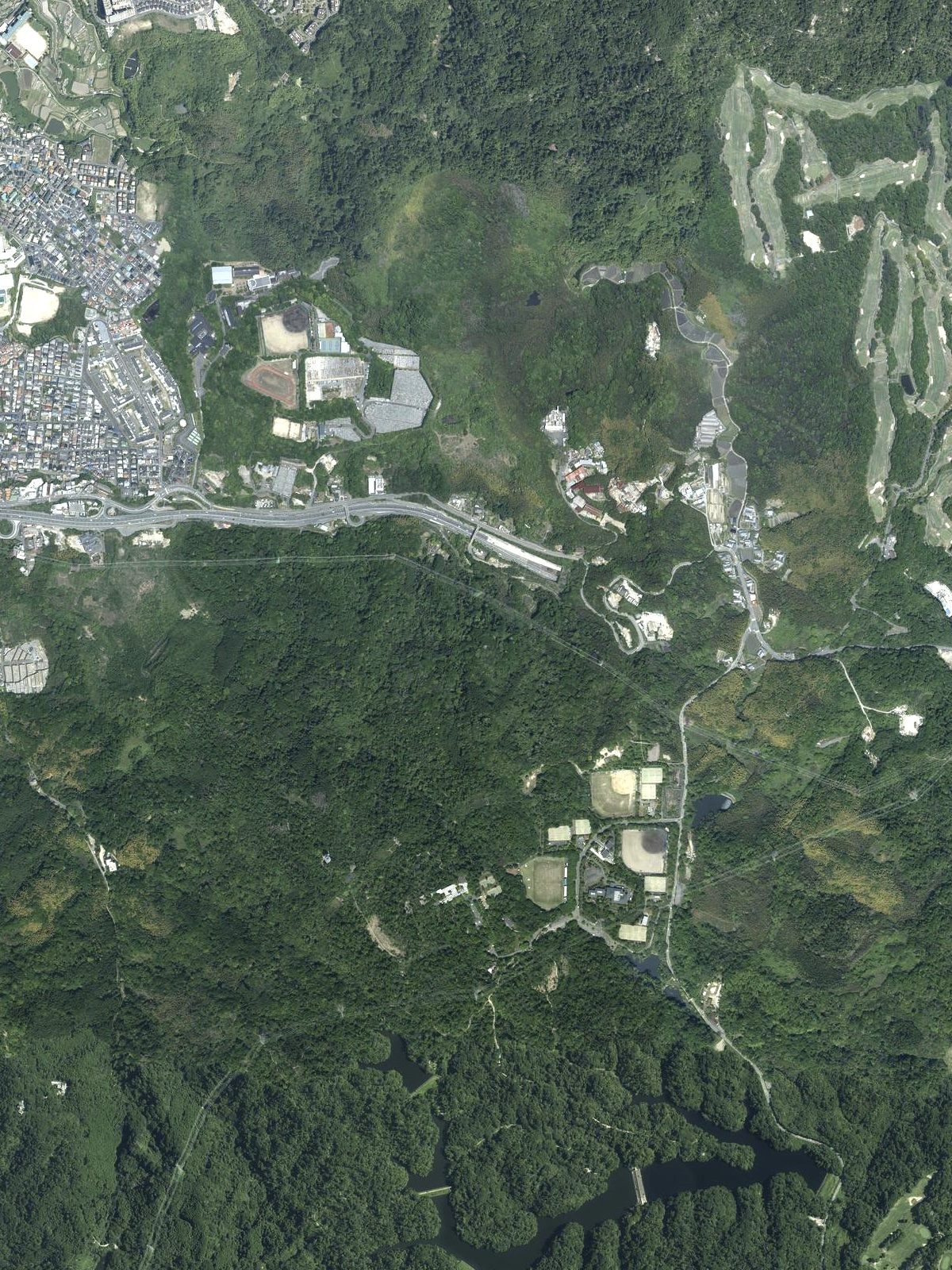
Kiyotaki & Muroike

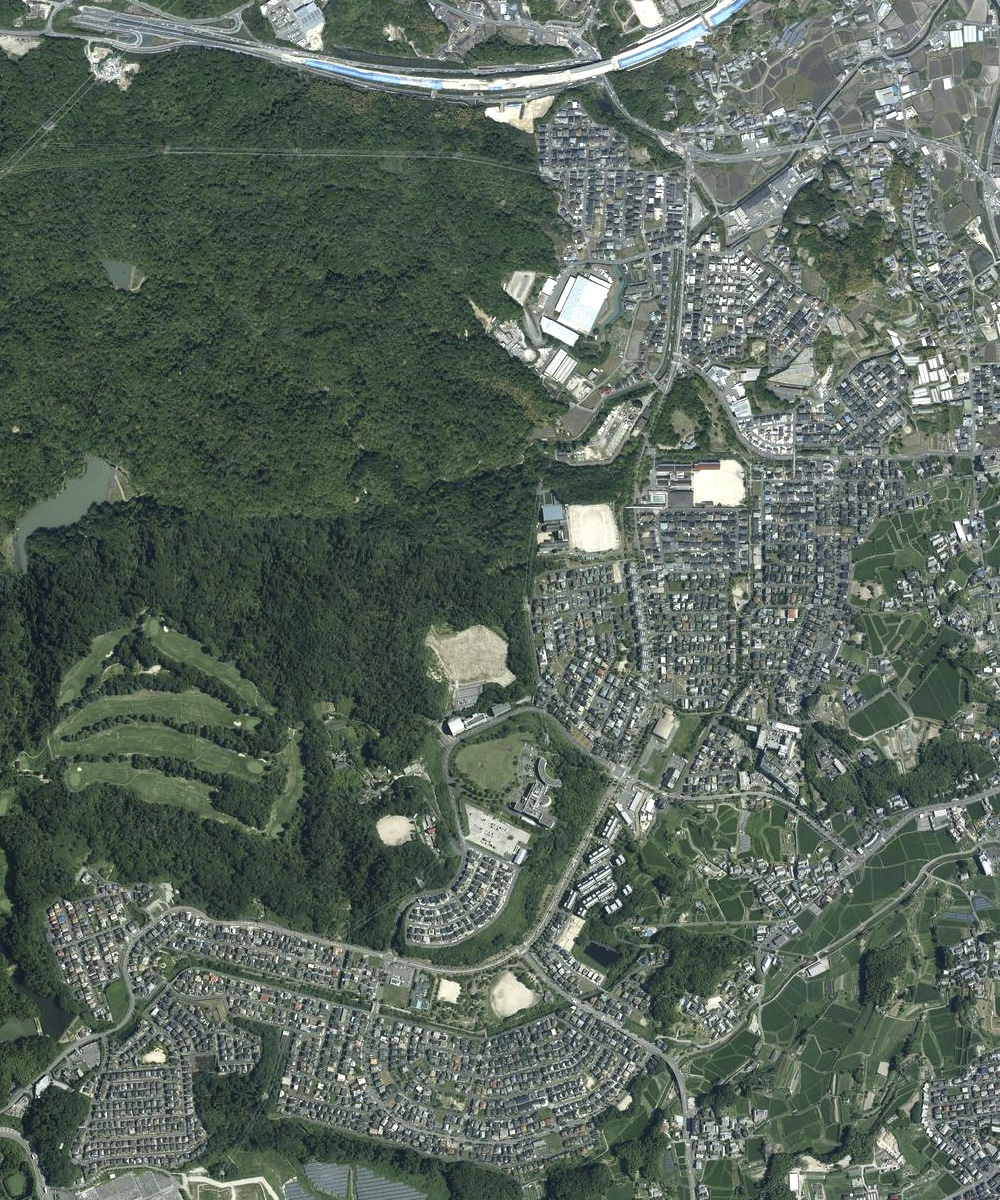
Tawara

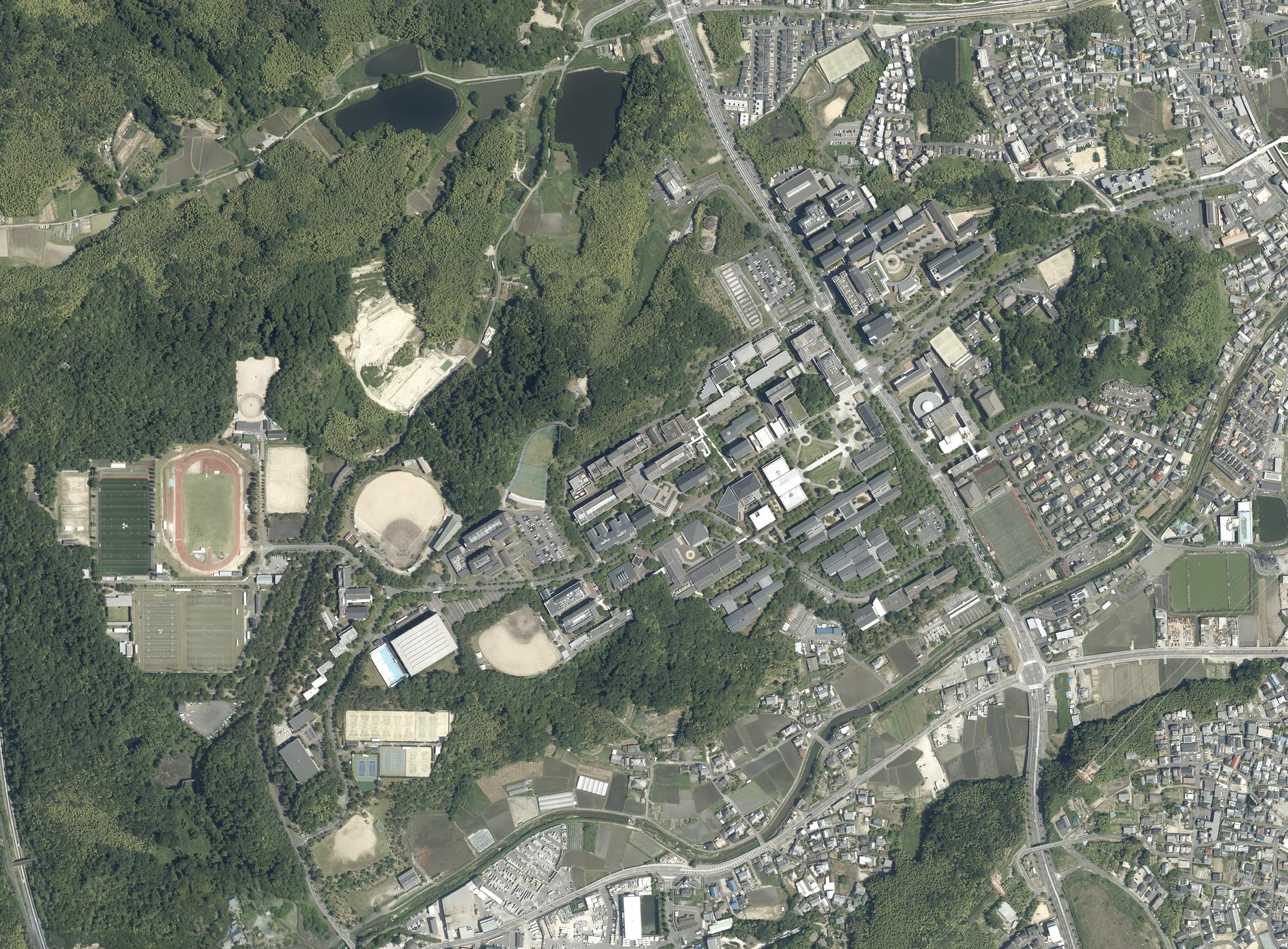
Tanabe

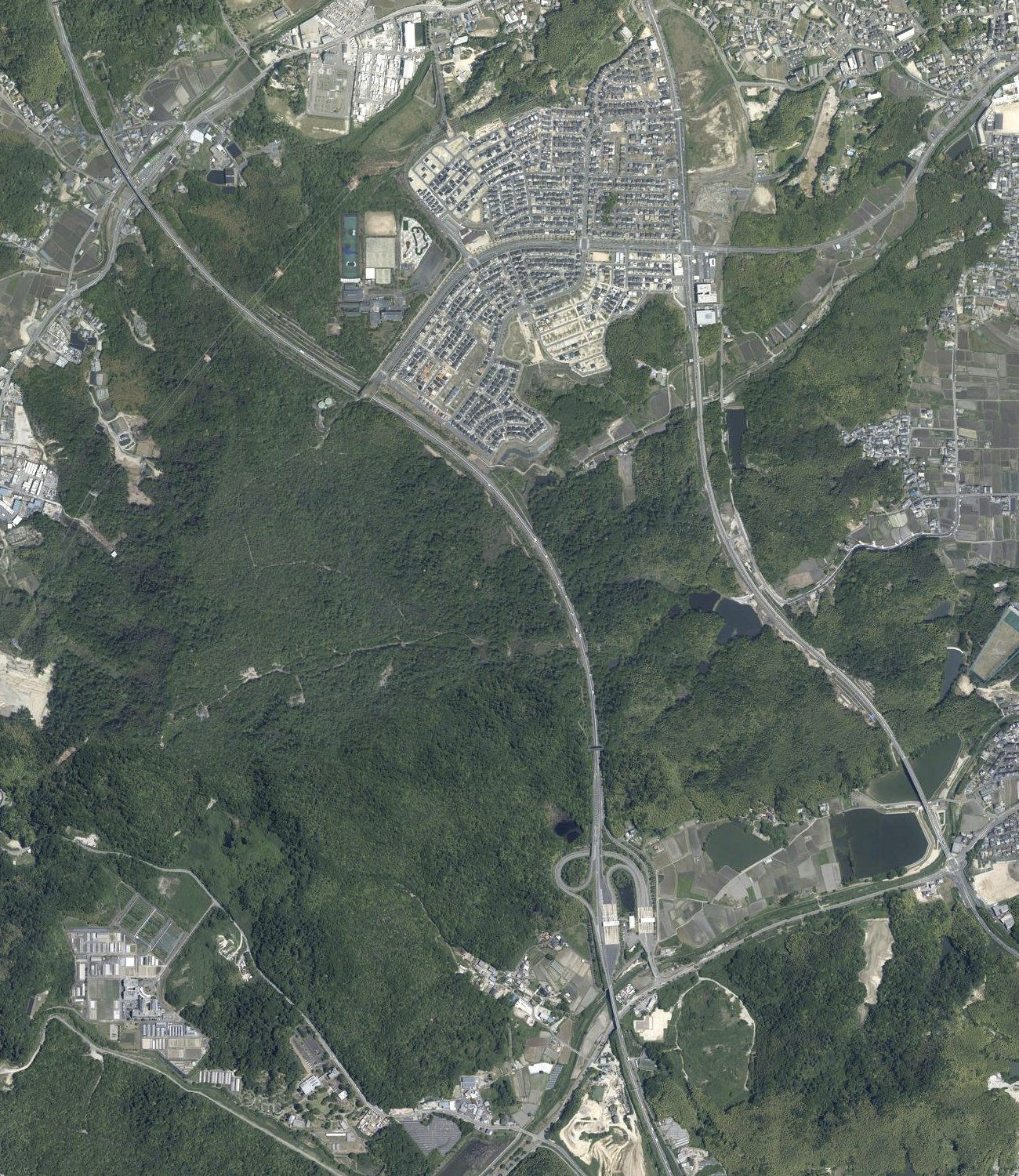
Minamitanabe & Komada

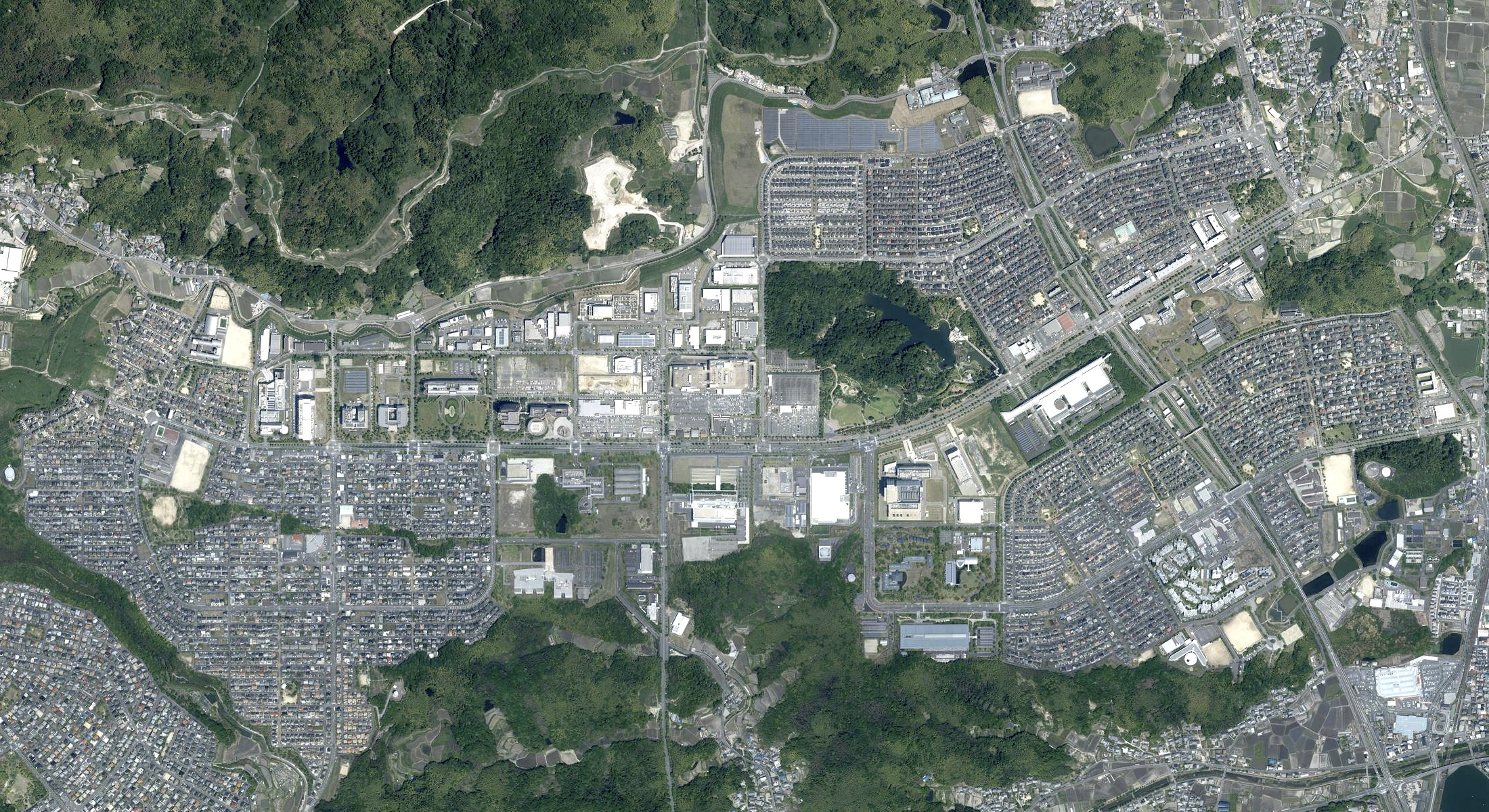
Seika & Nishikizu

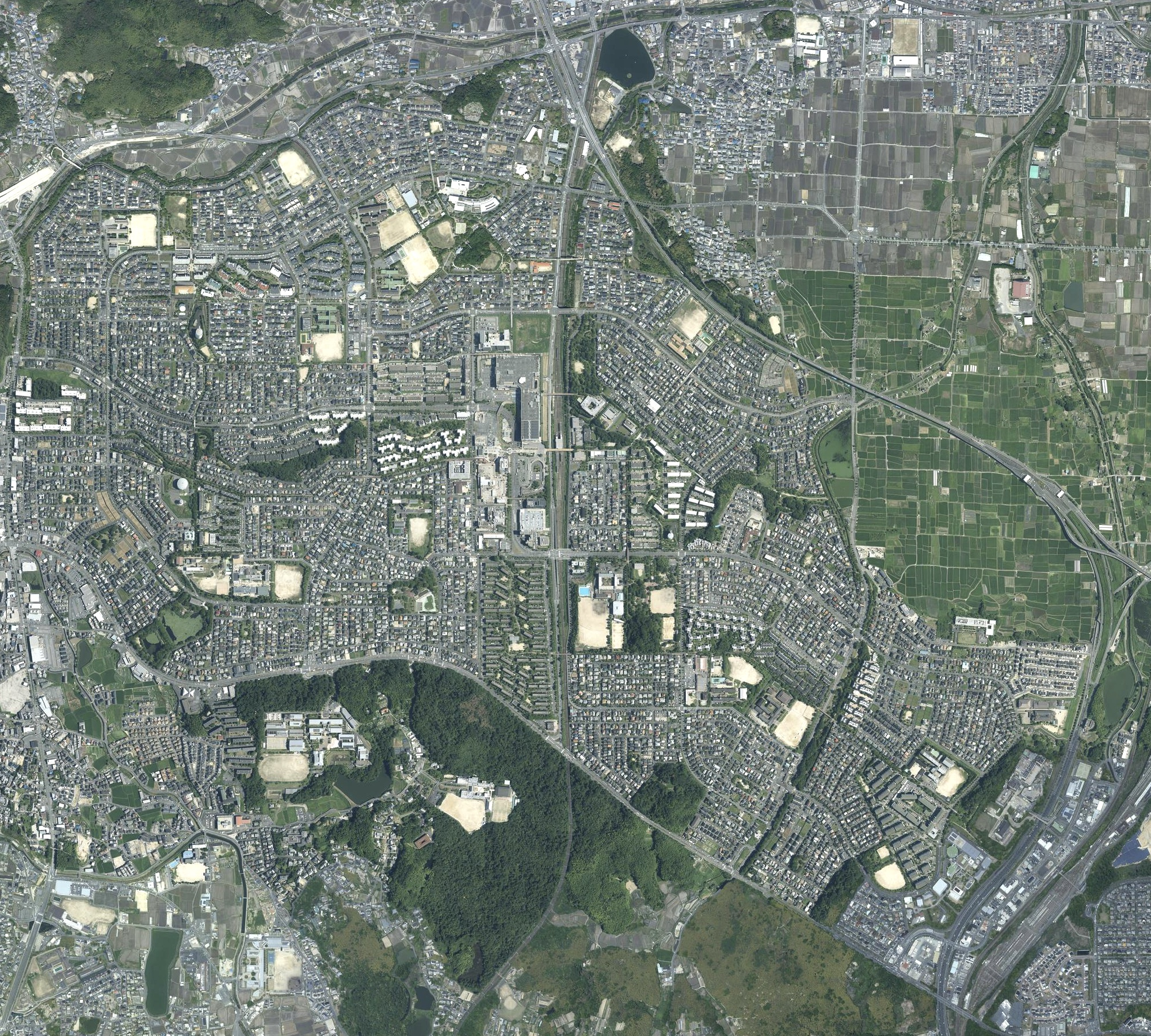
Heijo & Soraku

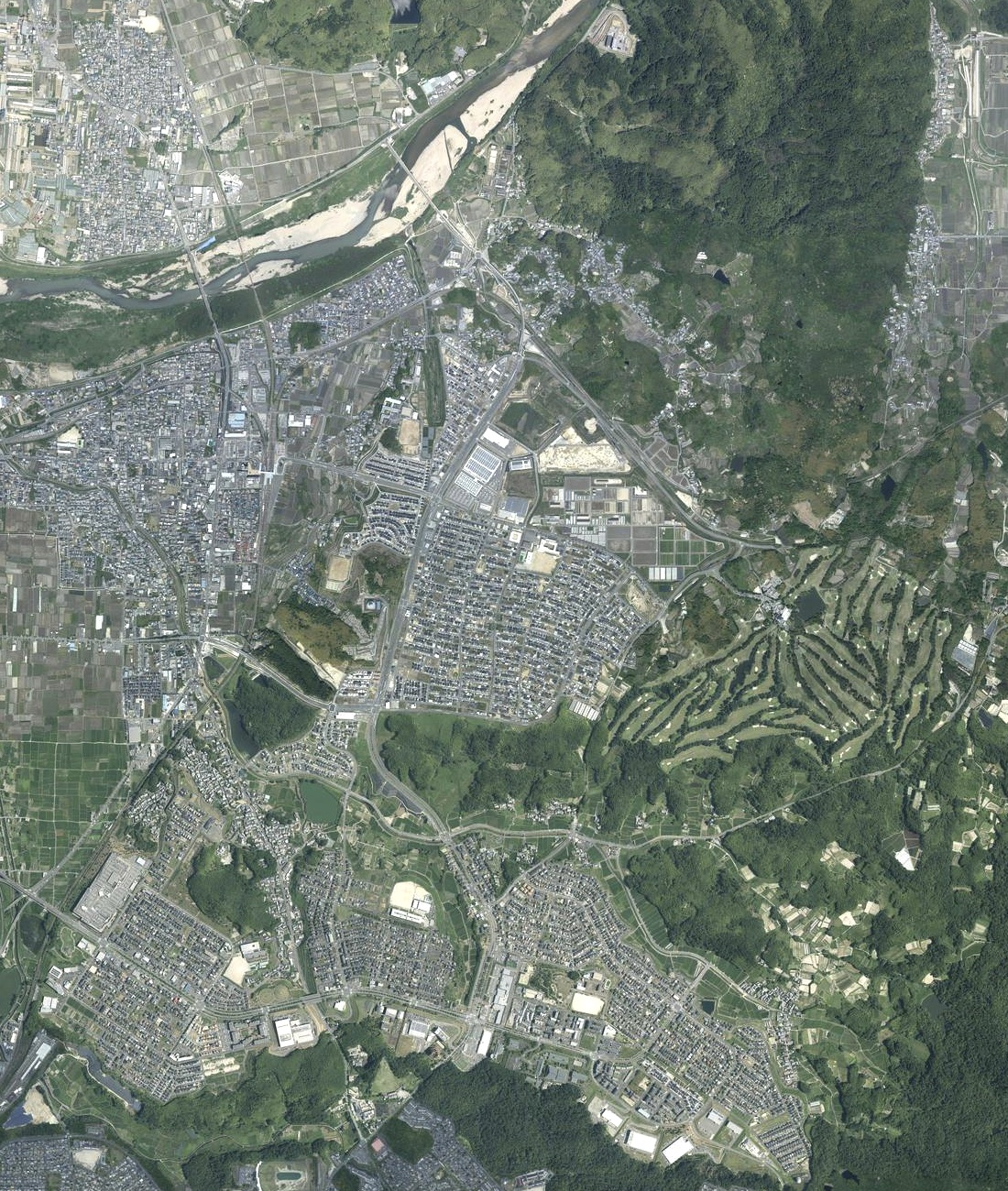
Kizu

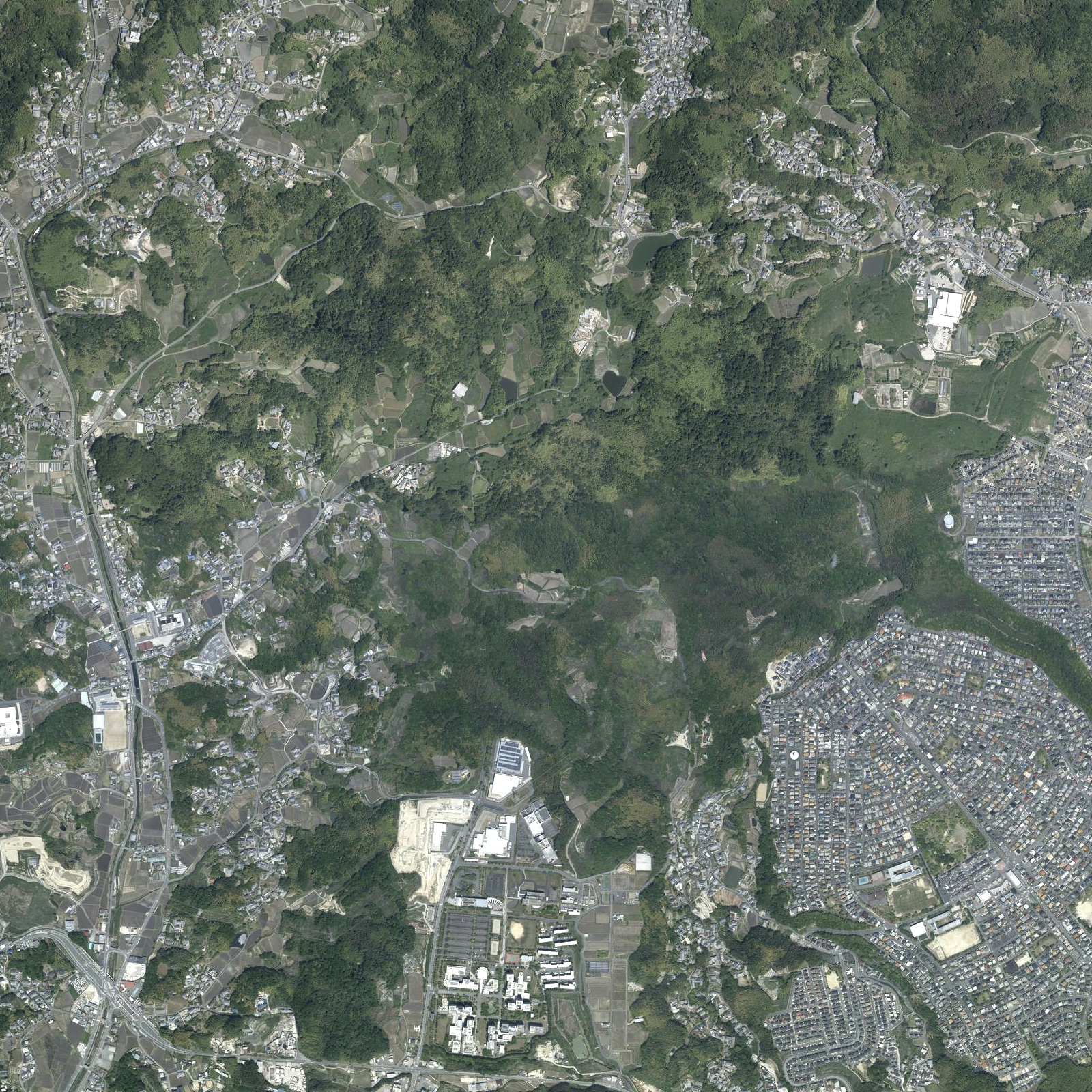
Takayama

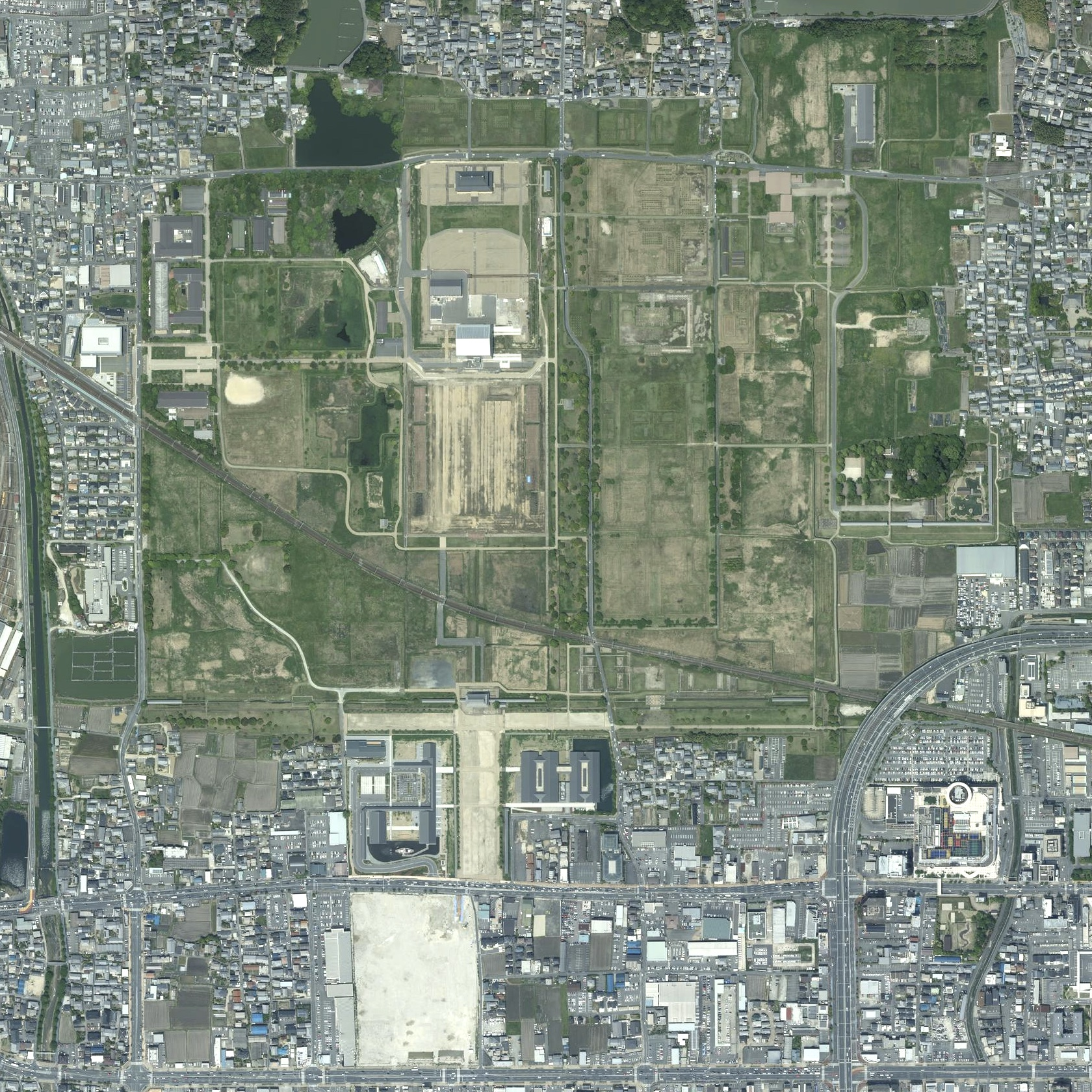
Heijo Palace Site

== Main research institutes and universities ==
=== Universities ===
- Shijonawate Campus, Osaka Electro-Communication University
- Doshisha University - Kyotanabe Campus, Tatara Campus, and Gakken Toshi Campus
- Kyotanabe Campus, Doshisha Women's College of Liberal Arts
- Institute of Free electron laser (iFEL), Osaka University
- Nara Institute of Science and Technology
- Seika Campus, Kyoto Prefectural University
- Experimental Farm, Kyoto University

=== Research institutes ===
- Universal Communication Research Institute, National Institute of Information and Communications Technology (NICT)
- Advanced Telecommunications Research Institute International (ATR)
- Technology Research Laboratory, Shimadzu
- Keihanna Research Center, Kyocera - optical and electronic devices, solar cells, advanced thin-film technologies
- Kansai Photon Science Institute, National Institutes for Quantum and Radiological Science and Technology (QST)
- Keihanna Site, Panasonic
- Keihanna Technology Innovation Center, OMRON
- International Institute for Advanced Studies (IIAS)
- Nara Research and Development Center, Santen Pharmaceutical
- Rohto Research Village Kyoto
- Kansai Electronic Industry Development Center - supported by the Ministry of Economy, Trade and Industry
- Ion Technology Center
- Research Institute of Innovative Technology for the Earth (RITE) - supported by the Ministry of Economy, Trade and Industry
- Keihanna Campus, Riken
- Suntory World Research Center
- Nidec Center for Industrial Science
- Keihanna Area, NTT Communication Science Laboratories
- Nara Research Institute for Cultural Properties

=== Other ===
- Kansai-kan of the National Diet Library
- Heijō Palace
- Keihanna Open Innovation Center @Kyoto (KICK)
- Keihanna Plaza

== Transportation ==
- Gakkentoshi Line, West Japan Railway Company (JR West)
- Nara Line (JR West)
- Kyoto Line, Kintetsu Railway (Kintetsu)
- Keihanna Line (Kintetsu)
- Shin-Meishin Expressway
- Second Keihan Highway
- Keinawa Expressway

In 2016, a government committee planning the final Kyoto-Osaka segment of the Hokuriku Shinkansen proposed routing the new high-speed line through Kyōtanabe.

About 100 minutes by bus from Kansai International Airport.

== See also ==
- Hanshin Industrial Region
- Harima Science Garden City
- Tsukuba Science City
