= Kizugawadai Station =

Railway station in Kizugawa, Kyoto Prefecture, Japan

Kizugawadai Station 木津川台駅
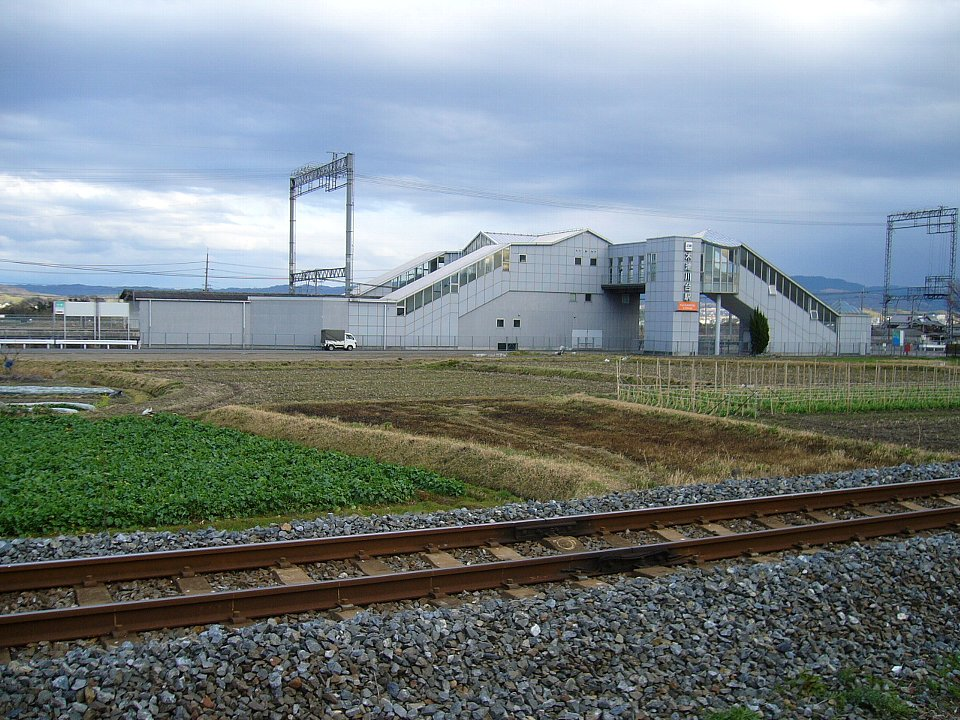
- Kizugawadai Station 2007

General information
- Location: Takadoi, Haji, Kizugawa-shi, Kyoto-fu 619-0221; Japan
- Coordinates: 34.7464°N 135.7959°E
- System: Kintetsu Railway commuter rail station
- Owner: Kintetsu Railway
- Operator: Kintetsu Railway
- Line: Kyoto/Kashihara Line
- Distance: 28.2 km from Kyoto
- Platforms: 2 side platforms
- Connections: Bus terminal

Other information
- Station code: B22
- Website: Official website

History
- Opened: 21 September 1994

Passengers
- 2019: 2288 daily

Services
Preceding station	Kintetsu Railway	Following station
Shin-Hōsono towards Kyōto	Kyoto Line Local	Yamadagawa towards Yamato-Saidaiji
Location
- Location within Kyoto Prefecture Location within Japan

Kizugawadai Station (木津川台駅, Kizugawadai-eki) is a passenger railway station located in the city of Kizugawa, Kyoto, Japan, operated by the private transportation company, Kintetsu Railway.It is station number B22.

== Lines ==
Kizugawadai Station is served by the Kyoto Line, and is located 28.2 rail kilometers from the terminus of the line at Kyoto Station.

== Station layout ==
The station consists of two opposed side platforms, connected by an elevated station building. Normally, only four-car local trains stop here, but the platforms can accommodate six-car trains. There are entrances and exits on both the east and west sides. There is only one ticket gate.

=== Platforms ===
1	■ Kintetsu Kyoto Line	For Yamato-Saidaiji, Nara, and Kashiharajingu-mae
2	■ Kintetsu Kyoto Line	For Shin-Tanabe, Kintetsu-Tambabashi, and Kyoto

== History ==
Kizugawadai Station opened on 21 September 1994.

== Passenger statistics ==
In fiscal 2018, the station was used by an average of 2288 passengers daily.

== Surrounding area ==
- Kintetsu Kizugawadai residential area
- Kyoto Prefectural Minamiyamashiro Support School

== See also ==
- List of railway stations in Japan
