= Kintetsu 6200 series =

Japanese train type

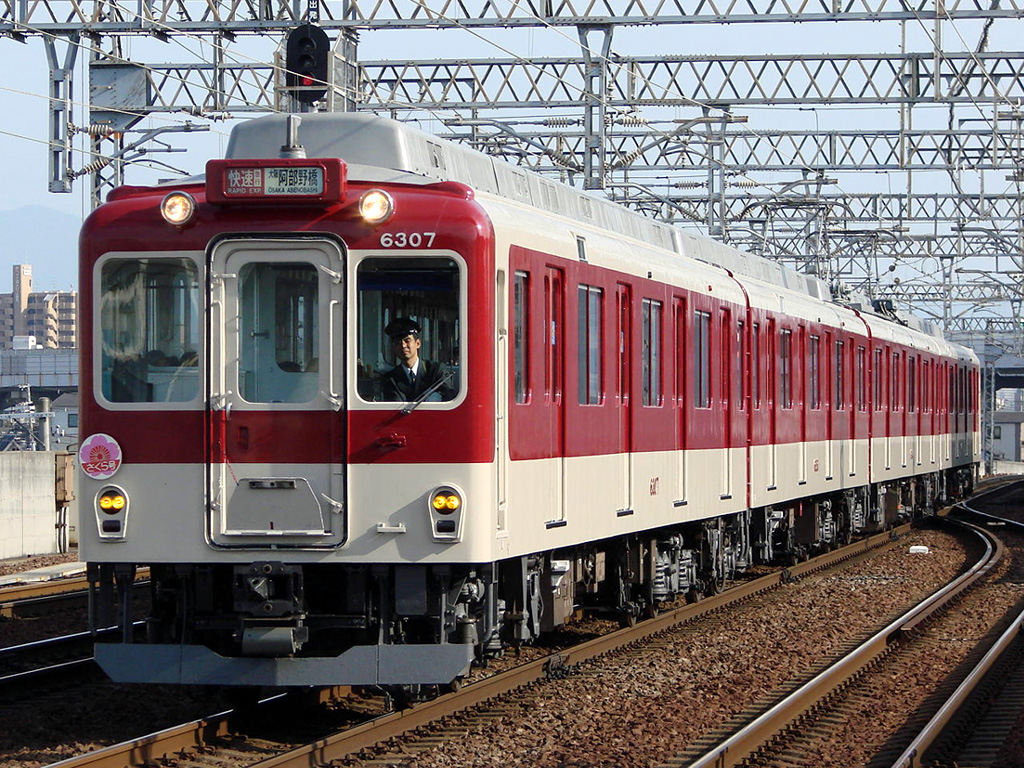
- A 6200 series trainset
- In service: 1974–present
- Manufacturer: Kinki Sharyo
- Number built: 38 vehicles (11 sets)
- Number in service: 35 vehicles (10 sets)
- Formation: 3/4 cars per trainset
- Fleet numbers: U01–U19 (odd numbers)
- Operator: Kintetsu Railway
- Line served: Minami Osaka Line

Specifications
- Car body construction: Steel
- Car length: 20,720 mm (68 ft 0 in)
- Width: 2,740 mm (9 ft 0 in)
- Height: 4,150 mm (13 ft 7 in)
- Doors: 4 pairs per side
- Maximum speed: 100 km/h (62 mph)
- Traction system: Resistor control
- Power output: 135 kW per motor
- Electric system: 1,500 V DC, overhead line
- Current collection: Pantograph
- Track gauge: 1,067 mm (3 ft 6 in)

The Kintetsu 6200 series (近鉄6200系) is an electric multiple unit (EMU) train type operated by the private railway operator Kintetsu Railway on Minami Osaka Line commuter services in Japan since 1974.

== Design ==
Based on the earlier 6020 series trains, the 6200 series trains were built with air-conditioning from new. A total of 38 vehicles (five four-car sets and six three-car sets) were built between 1974 and 1978.

== Formations ==
As of 1 April 2016 the fleet consisted of five four-car sets and six three-car sets formed as follows.

=== Three-car sets ===
The three-car sets are formed as follows with two motored ("M" and "Mc") cars and one non-powered trailer ("T") car.

Designation	Tc	M	Mc
Numbering	Ku 63xx	Mo 62xx (even)	Mo 62xx (odd)

The "M" car has two pantographs.

=== Four-car sets ===
The four-car sets are formed as follows with two motored ("M" and "Mc") cars and two non-powered trailer ("T" and "Tc") cars.

Designation	Tc	T	M	Mc
Numbering	Ku 63xx	Sa 635x	Mo 62xx (even)	Mo 62xx (odd)

The "M" car has two pantographs.

== Interior ==
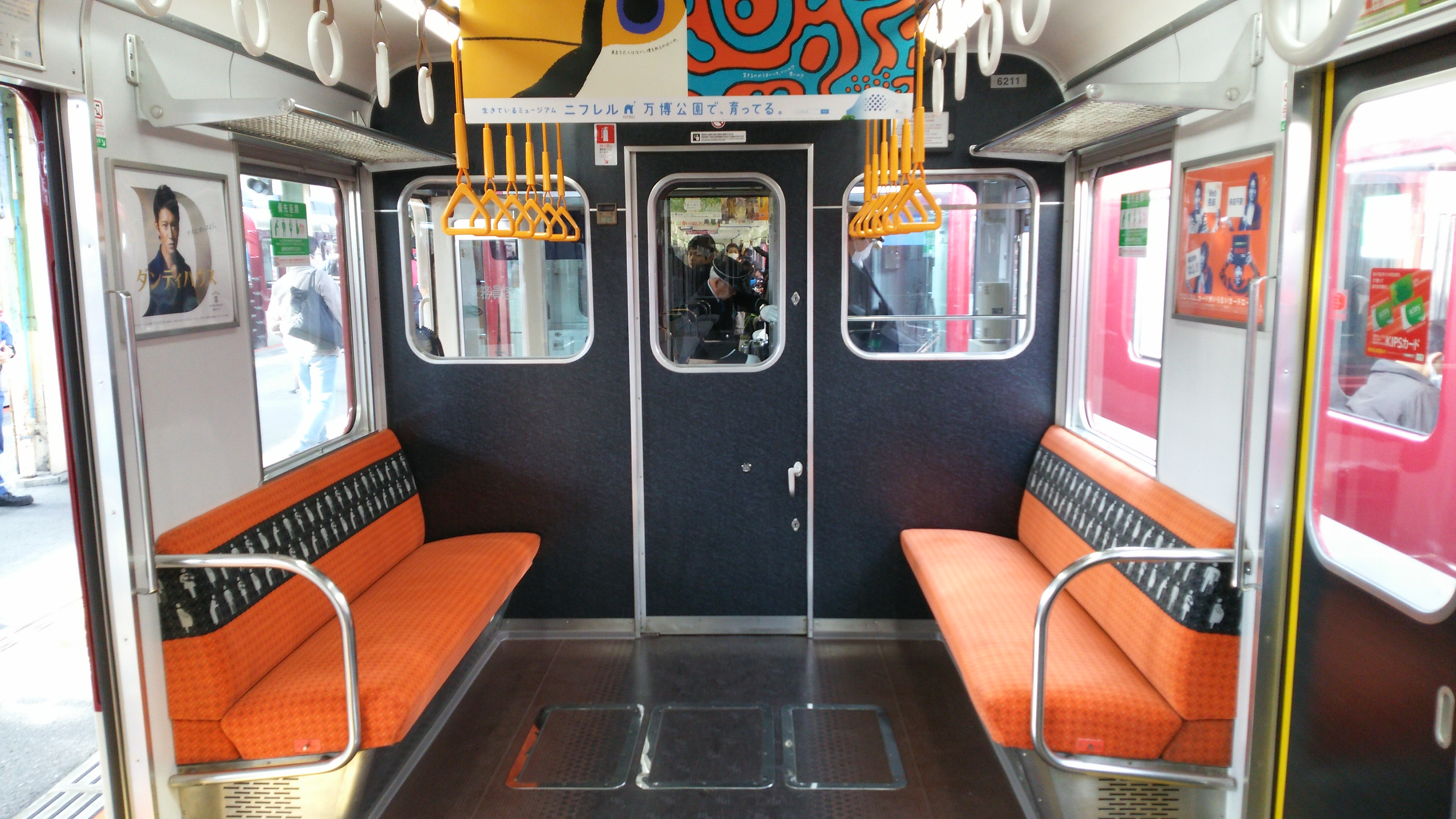

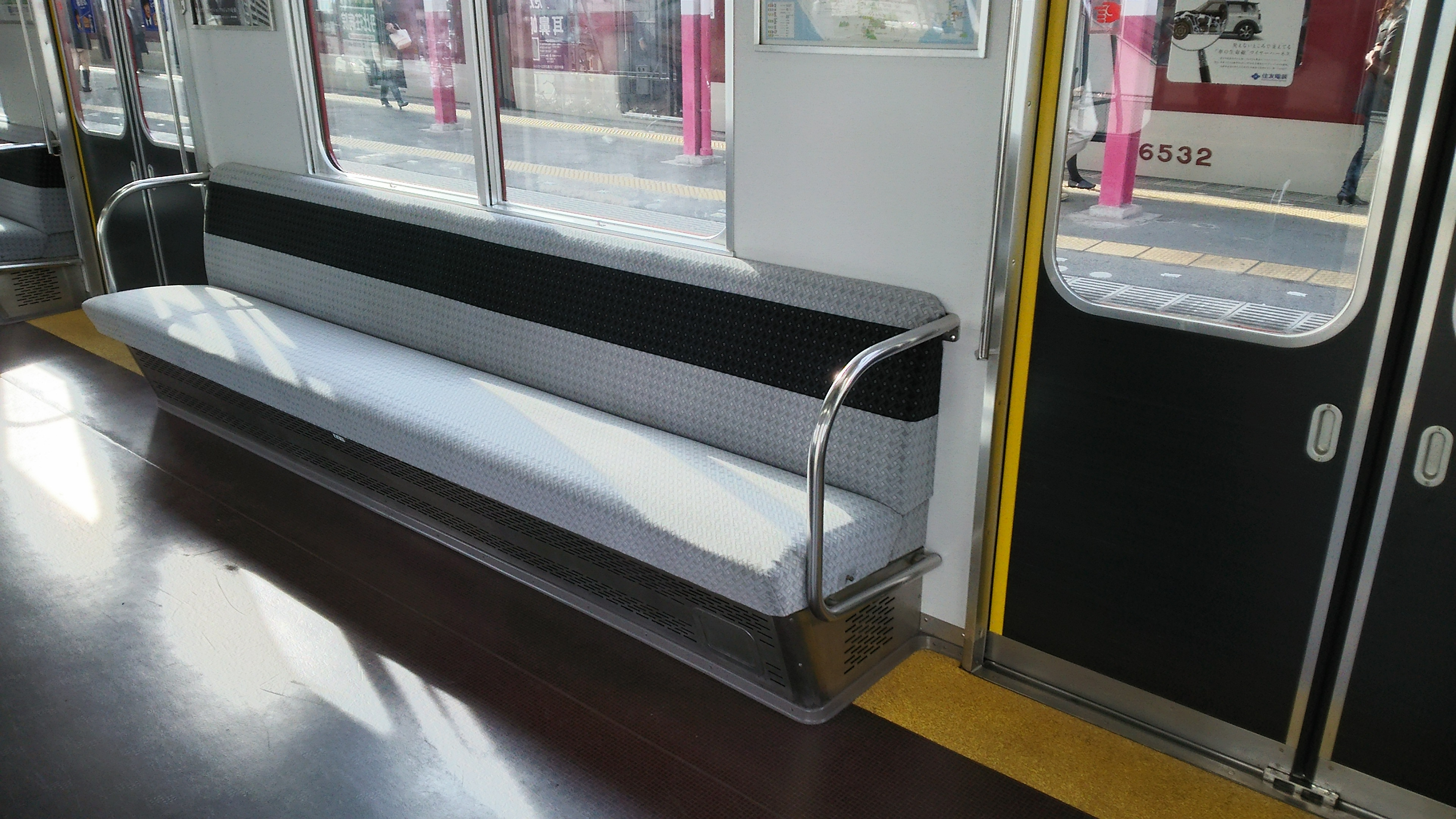

== History ==
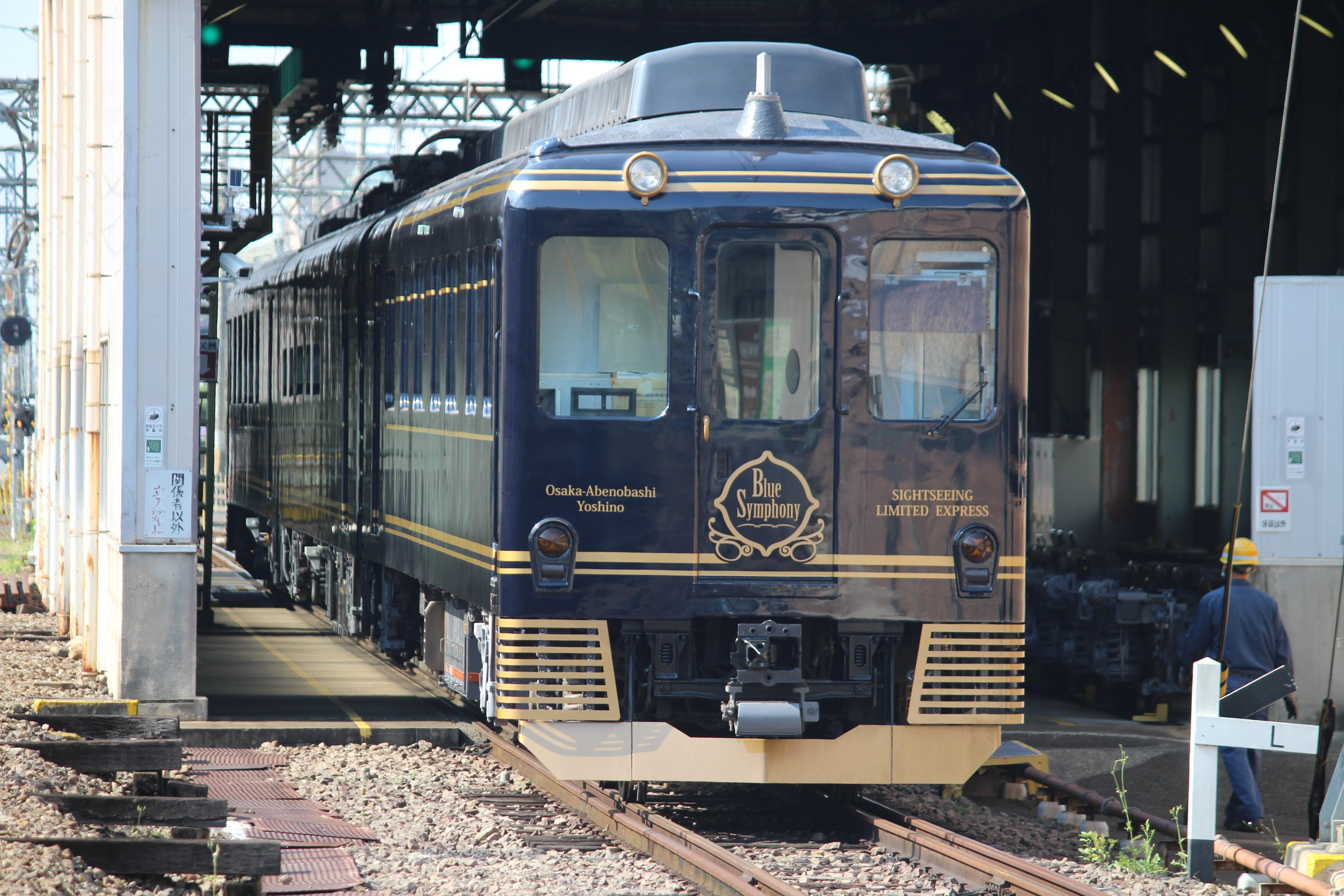
The 16200 series Blue Symphony sightseeing train in July 2016

The first trains entered service in 1974.

In 2016, one three-car set was rebuilt to become the 16200 series Blue Symphony sightseeing train for use on the Minami Osaka and Yoshino Lines.
