= 2400 series =

2400 series may refer to:

== Train types ==
- CTA 2400 series electric multiple unit formerly operating for the Chicago Transit Authority
- Keihan 2400 series electric multiple unit operating for Keihan Electric Railway
- Kintetsu 2400 series electric multiple unit operating for Kintetsu Railway since 1966
- Odakyu 2400 series electric multiple unit formerly operating for Odakyu Electric Railway from 1960 to 1989
