= Kintetsu 2400 series =

Japanese train type

The Kintetsu 2400 series (近鉄2400系, Kintetsu 2400-kei) is an electric multiple unit (EMU) train type operated by the private railway operator Kintetsu Railway since 1966 on many of its commuter lines in the Kansai area of Japan.

== Design ==
First introduced in 1966, the design is based on the earlier 1480 series design, also manufactured by Kinki Sharyo. All trainsets run on standard gauge 1,435 mm (4 ft 8 1/2 in) tracks.

The trainsets incorporate improvements in the 1M1T formations and derivatives.

== Variants ==
- 2400 series: 2-car sets primarily used on the Osaka Line
- 2410 series: 2-car sets built equipped with increased air circulation
- 2430 series: 3-car and 4-car sets primarily used on Osaka Line semi-express services
- 2444 series: 3-car sets modified for single operator "wanman" operation

== 2400 series ==
2400 series
- In service: 1966–2004
- Manufacturer: Kinki Sharyo
- Constructed: 1966
- Entered service: 1966
- Scrapped: 1998–2004
- Number built: 12 vehicles (6 sets)
- Number in service: None
- Number preserved: None
- Number scrapped: 12 vehicles
- Formation: 2 cars per trainset
- Fleet numbers: W01–W06
- Capacity: 170 per car
- Operators: Kintetsu Railway
- Depots: Higashi Hanazono
- Lines served: Osaka Line

Specifications
- Car length: 20,720 mm (68 ft 0 in)
- Width: 2,800 mm (9 ft 2 in)
- Height: 4,012 mm (13 ft 2.0 in); Cars with electric fans
- Doors: 4 pairs per side
- Maximum speed: 105 km/h (65 mph)
- Power output: 155 kW (208 hp) per motor
- Electric system(s): 1,500 V DC overhead wire
- Current collection: Pantograph
- Bogies: KD-60
- Track gauge: 1,435 mm (4 ft 8 1/2 in)

The 2400 series was the base variant in the 2400 series family. Introduced in 1966, these cars were never refurbished, although a few techinal upgrades did occur in the mid 1980s.

=== Formation ===
The six two-car sets were formed as follows.

| Car No. | 1 | 2 |
|---|---|---|
| Numbering | Mo 2400 | Ku 2500 |
| Capacity (total) | 170 | 180 |

=== Interior ===
Seating consisted of longitudinal seating throughout, as was with the later variants.

=== Disposal ===
From 1998 to January 2004, all of the trains in the series were scrapped. Some motor and cab equipment would later be reused some Kintetsu non-passenger trains.

== 2410 series ==
2410 series
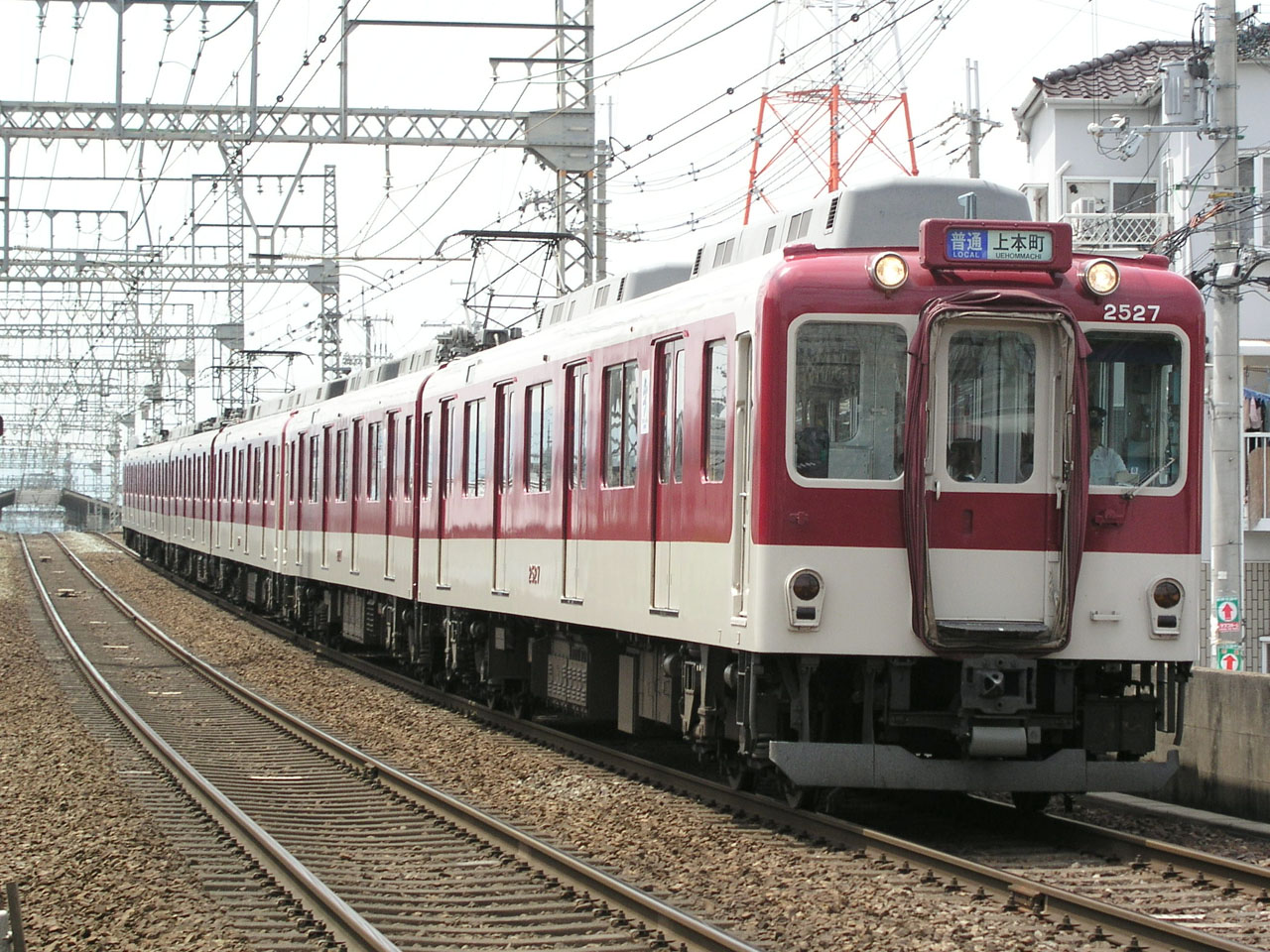
- 2410 series set between Takayasu and Onji
- In service: 1968–present
- Manufacturer: Kinki Sharyo
- Constructed: 1968–1971
- Entered service: 1968
- Refurbished: 1996–2002
- Scrapped: 2004–2019
- Number built: 39 vehicles
- Formation: 2, 3 or 4 cars per trainset
- Fleet numbers: W10–W28, AG29–AG30
- Capacity: 170 per car
- Operators: Kintetsu Railway
- Depots: Higashi Hanazono; Saidaiji
- Lines served: Osaka Line

Specifications
- Car length: 20,720 mm (68 ft 0 in)
- Width: 2,800 mm (9 ft 2 in)
- Height: 4,050 mm (13 ft 3 in); Cars with electric fans
- Doors: 4 pairs per side
- Maximum speed: 105 km/h (65 mph)
- Power output: 145 kW (194 hp) per motor
- HVAC: Cross Fan
- Electric system(s): 1,500 V DC overhead wire
- Current collection: Pantograph
- Bogies: KD-60/KD-66A/F/G
- Track gauge: 1,435 mm (4 ft 8 1/2 in)

The 2410 series are 2400 series sets with modifications to the location of various onboard equipment, including the installation of a cross-flow fan. Three-car sets are re-fitted for wanman driver-only operation.

=== Formations ===
The 2-car sets are formed as follows.

| Car No. | 1 | 2 |
|---|---|---|
| Numbering | Mo 2410 | Ku 2510 |

=== Refurbishment ===
All cars were refurbished from 1996 to 2002. Air conditioning was installed as part of the upgrade.

=== Interior ===
Seating consists of longitudinal seating throughout.

=== Gallery ===
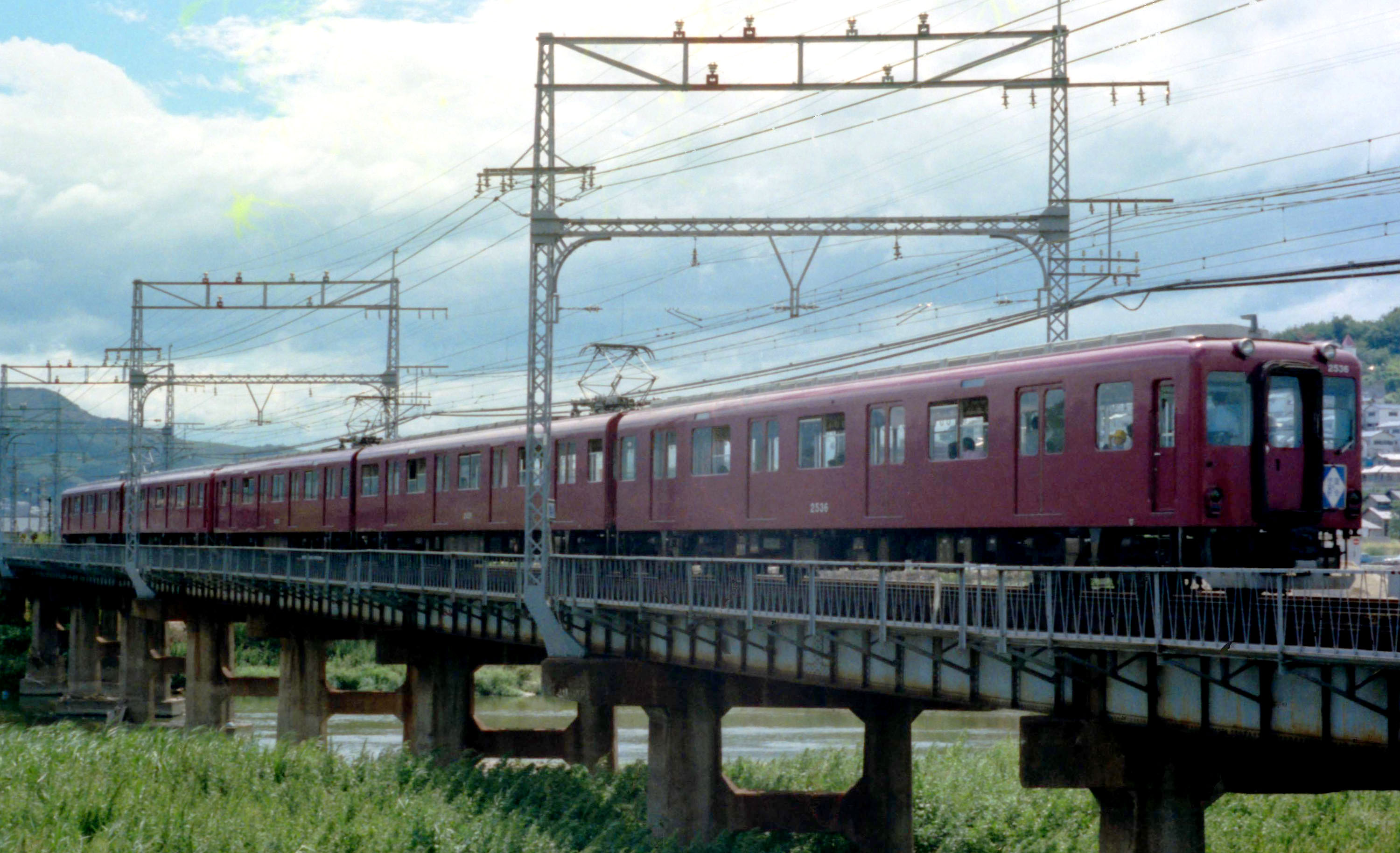
Set 2430 in 1978 sporting an older burgundy livery

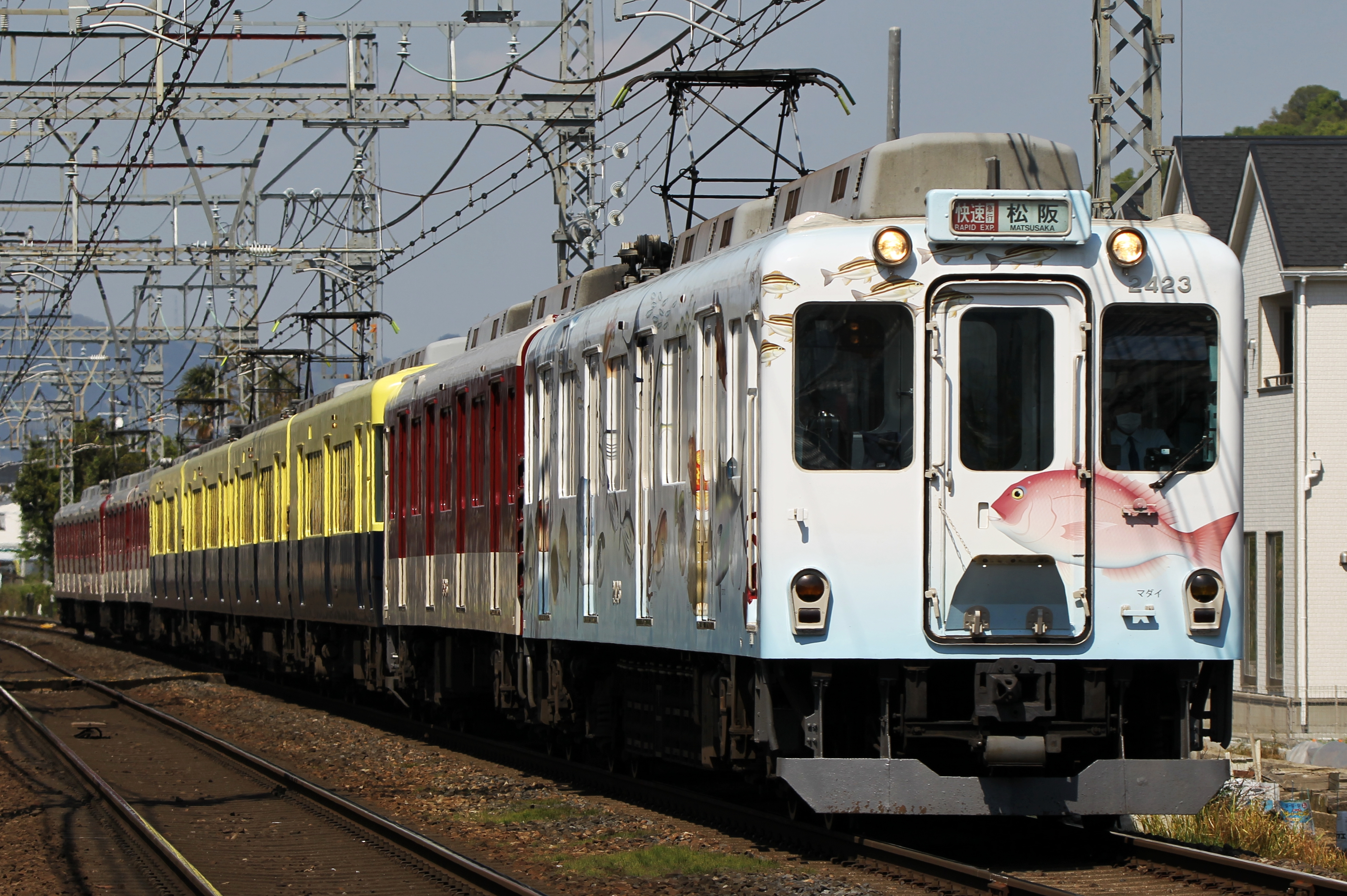
Kintetsu 2423 repainted to the "Fresh Fish Train"

== 2430 series ==
2430 series
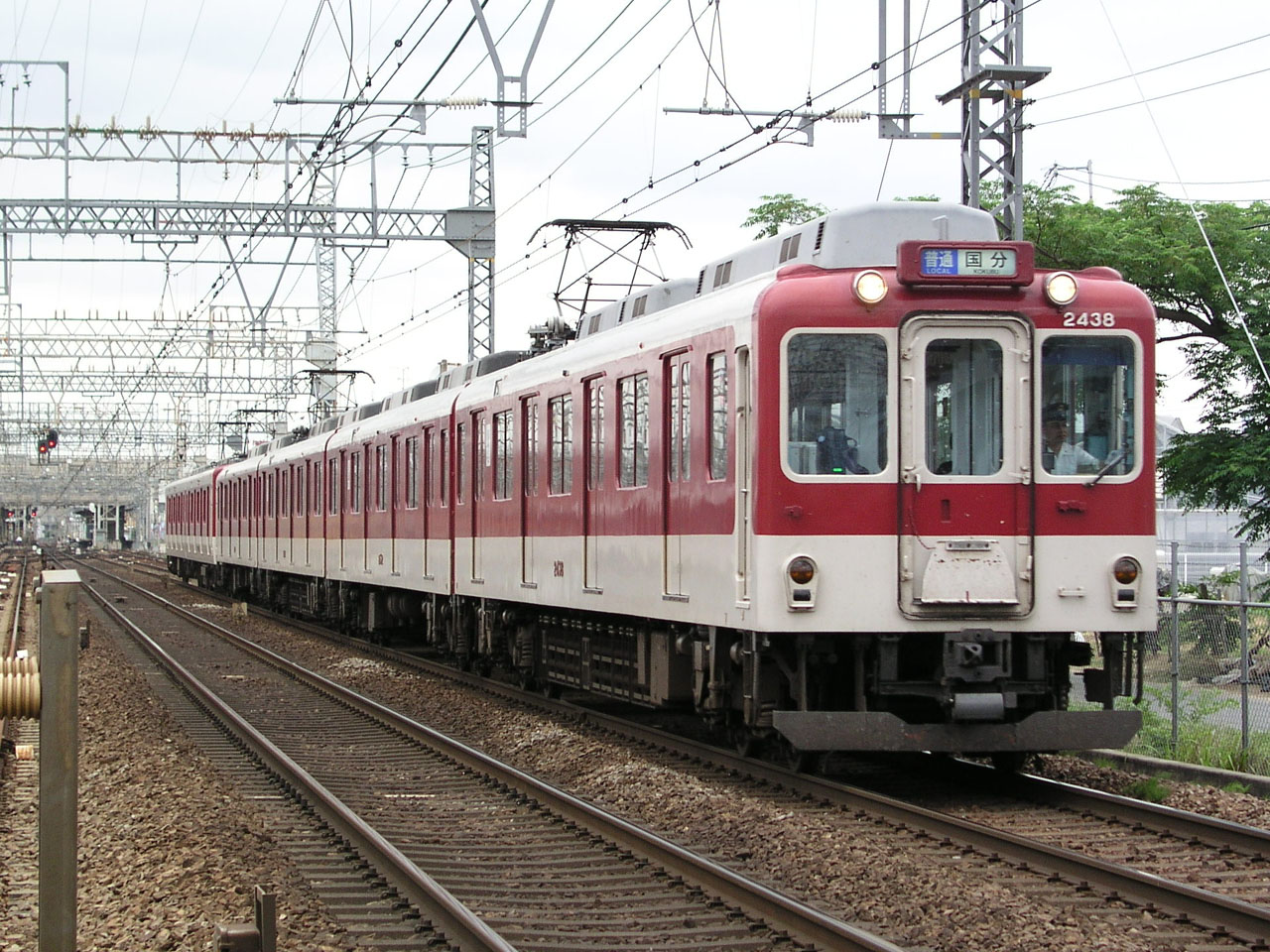
- Set 2438 between Takayasu and Onji
- In service: 1971–present
- Manufacturer: Kinki Sharyo
- Constructed: 1971
- Entered service: 1971
- Refurbished: 1988–1995
- Number built: 55 vehicles
- Number in service: 55 vehicles
- Formation: 3 or 4 cars per trainset
- Fleet numbers: W31–W32, AG33, G34–G36, AG37–AG38, G39–G40, W41–W42, AG43
- Capacity: 170 (end cars); 190 (intermediate cars)
- Operators: Kintetsu Railway
- Depots: Higashi-Hanazono; Saidaiji
- Lines served: Nara Line; Osaka Line

Specifications
- Car length: 20,720 mm (68 ft 0 in)
- Width: 2,800 mm (9 ft 2 in)
- Height: 4,012 mm (13 ft 2.0 in); Cars with electric fans
- Doors: 4 pairs per side
- Maximum speed: 105 km/h (65 mph)
- Power output: 145 kW (194 hp) per motor
- Electric system(s): 1,500 V DC overhead wire
- Current collection: Pantograph
- Bogies: KD-76
- Track gauge: 1,435 mm (4 ft 8 1/2 in)

The 2430 series started appearing in 1973. All trains remain in service.

=== Formations ===
The three-car sets are formed as follows.

| Car No. | 1 | 2 | 3 |
|---|---|---|---|
| Designation | Ku 2530 | Mo 2450 | Mo 2430 |

The four-car sets are formed as follows. Over the years, car 3 has resulted in various reconfigurations including former 1480 series cars. This was to resolve operational issues with slopes on the Osaka Line.

| Car No. | 1 | 2 | 3 | 4 |
|---|---|---|---|---|
| Designation | Ku 2530 | Mo 2450 | Sa 1970; Sa 2550; Sa 1550 | Mo 2430 |

=== Refurbishment ===
The sets were refurbished between 1988 and 1995.

=== Interior ===
Seating consists of longitudinal seating throughout, like the other variants.

=== Gallery ===
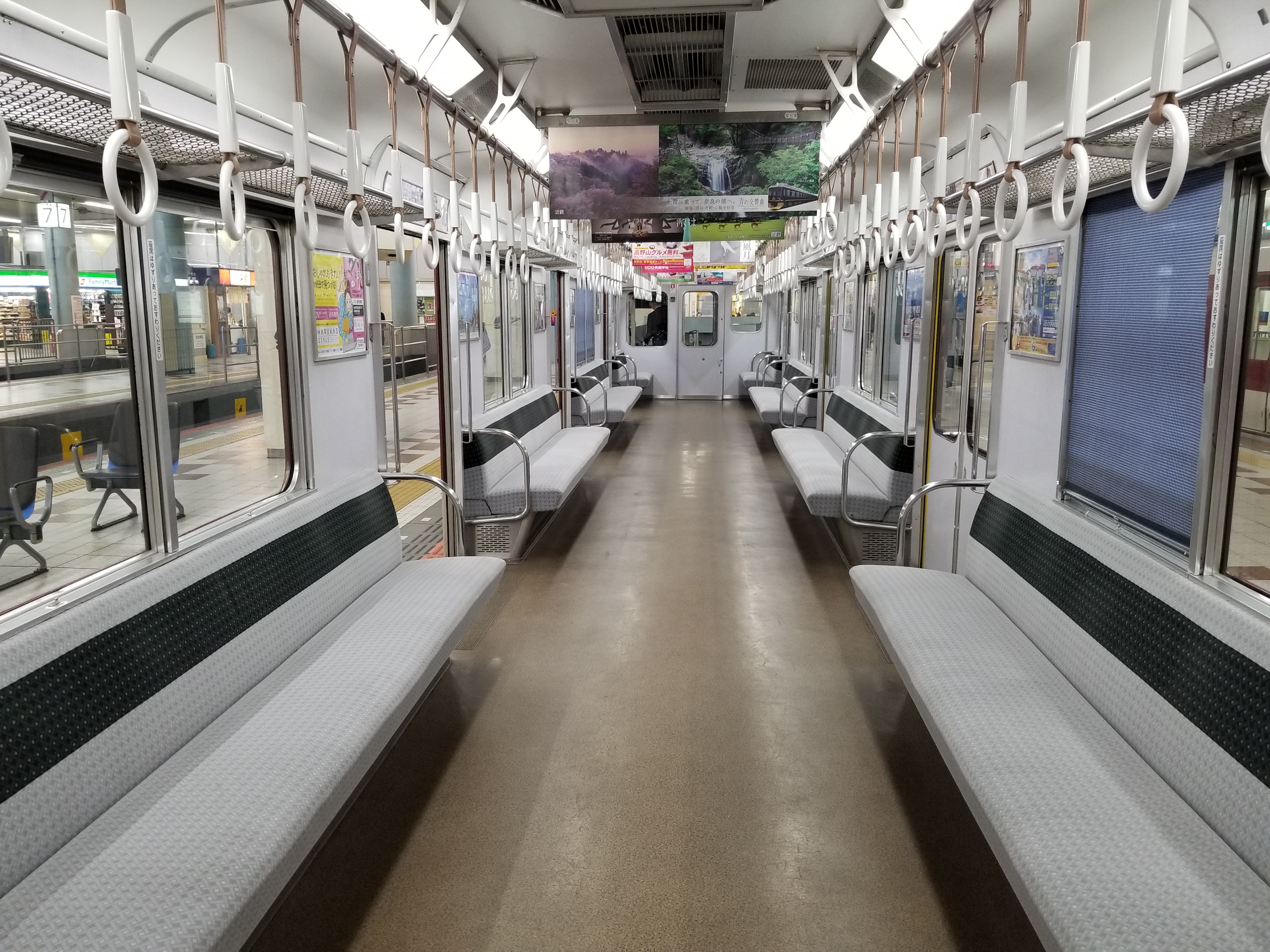
Interior of a 2430 series car

== 2444 series ==
2444 series
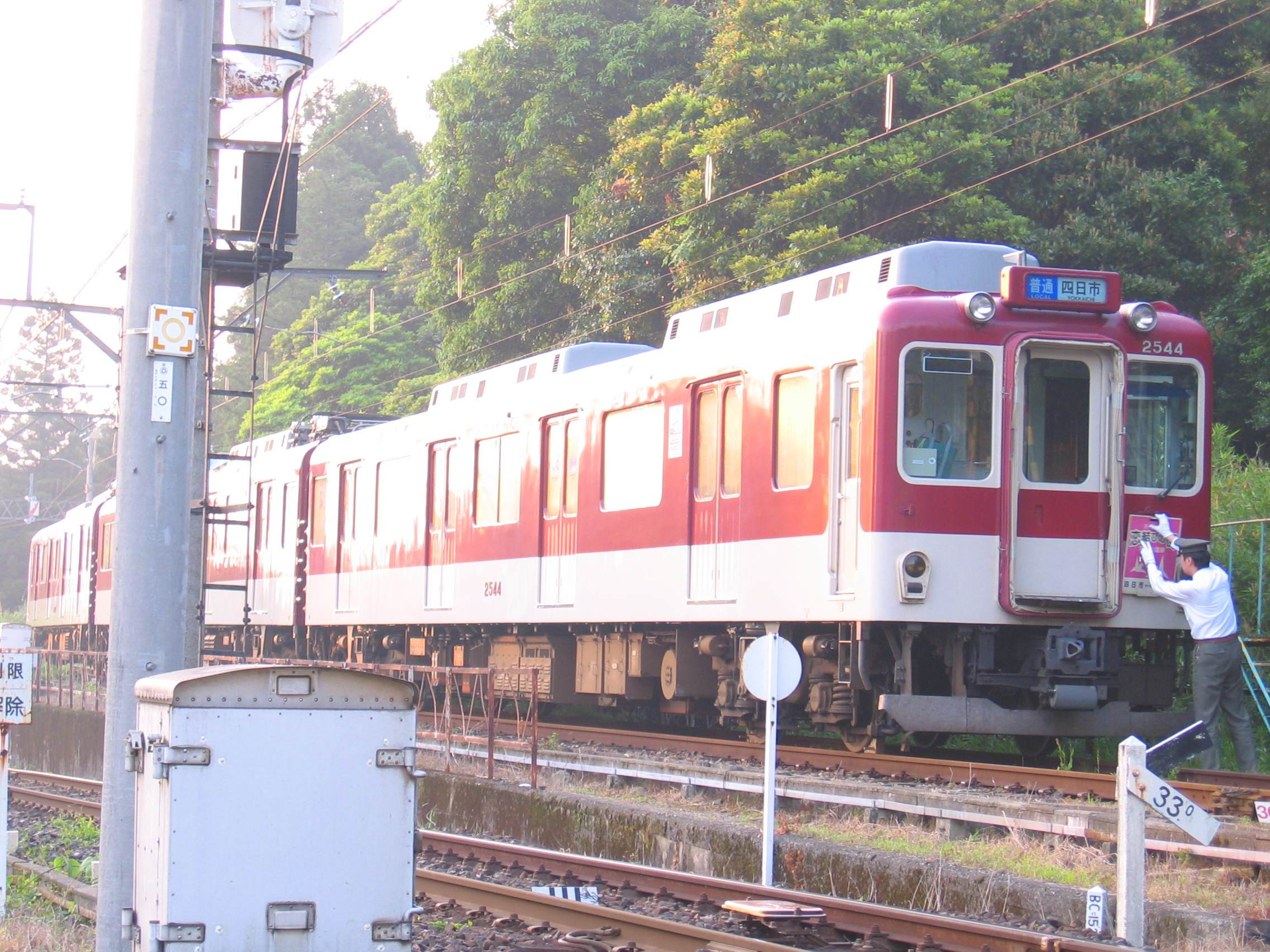
- Set 2444 in 2008
- In service: 1976–present
- Manufacturer: Kinki Sharyo
- Constructed: 1976
- Entered service: 1976
- Refurbished: 2007
- Number built: 6 vehicles (2 sets)
- Number in service: 6 vehicles (2 sets)
- Formation: 3-cars per trainset
- Fleet numbers: G44–G45
- Capacity: 170 (end cars); 190 (intermediate cars)
- Operators: Kintetsu Railway
- Depots: Meisei
- Lines served: Nagoya Line

Specifications
- Car length: 20,720 mm (68 ft 0 in)
- Width: 2,800 mm (9 ft 2 in)
- Doors: 4 pairs per side
- Maximum speed: 110 km/h (68 mph)
- Power output: 145 kW (194 hp) per motor
- Electric system(s): 1,500 V DC overhead wire
- Current collection: Pantograph
- Bogies: KD-86
- Track gauge: 1,435 mm (4 ft 8 1/2 in)

This sub-series consists of two 3-car sets remodeled for "Wanman" one-person operation. The top speed was also increased from 105 km/h (65 mph) to 110 km/h (68 mph) for unknown reasons.

=== Formations ===
The 3-car sets are formed as follows.

| Car No. | 1 | 2 | 3 |
|---|---|---|---|
| Designation | Ku 2544 | Mo 2464 | Mo 2444 |

=== Modifications ===
Modifications for "Wanman" operation took place at Koan Depot.

=== Interior ===
Seating consists of longitudinal seating throughout.
