= Kinki Sharyo SLRV =

Light rail vehicle manufactured by Kinki Sharyo

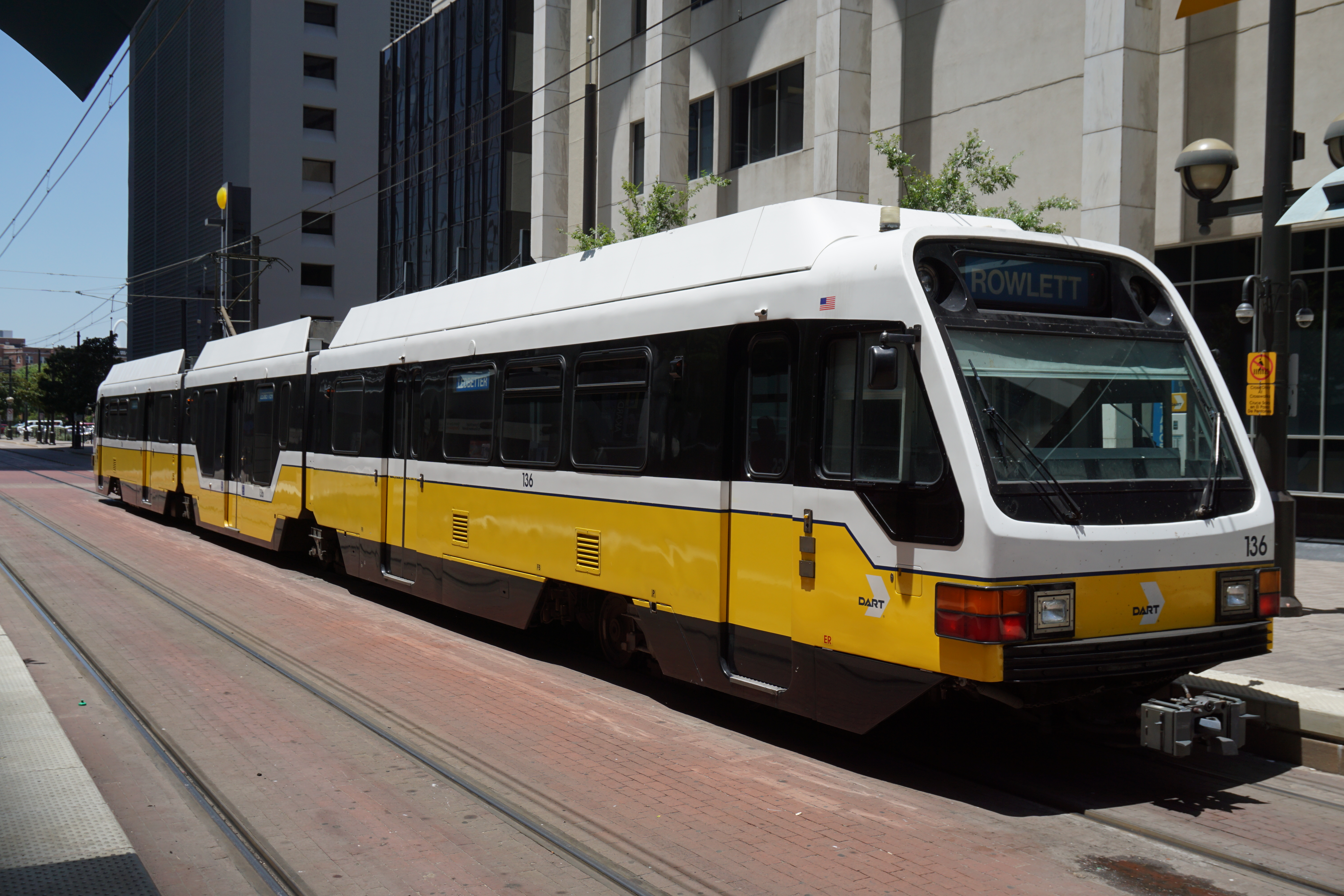

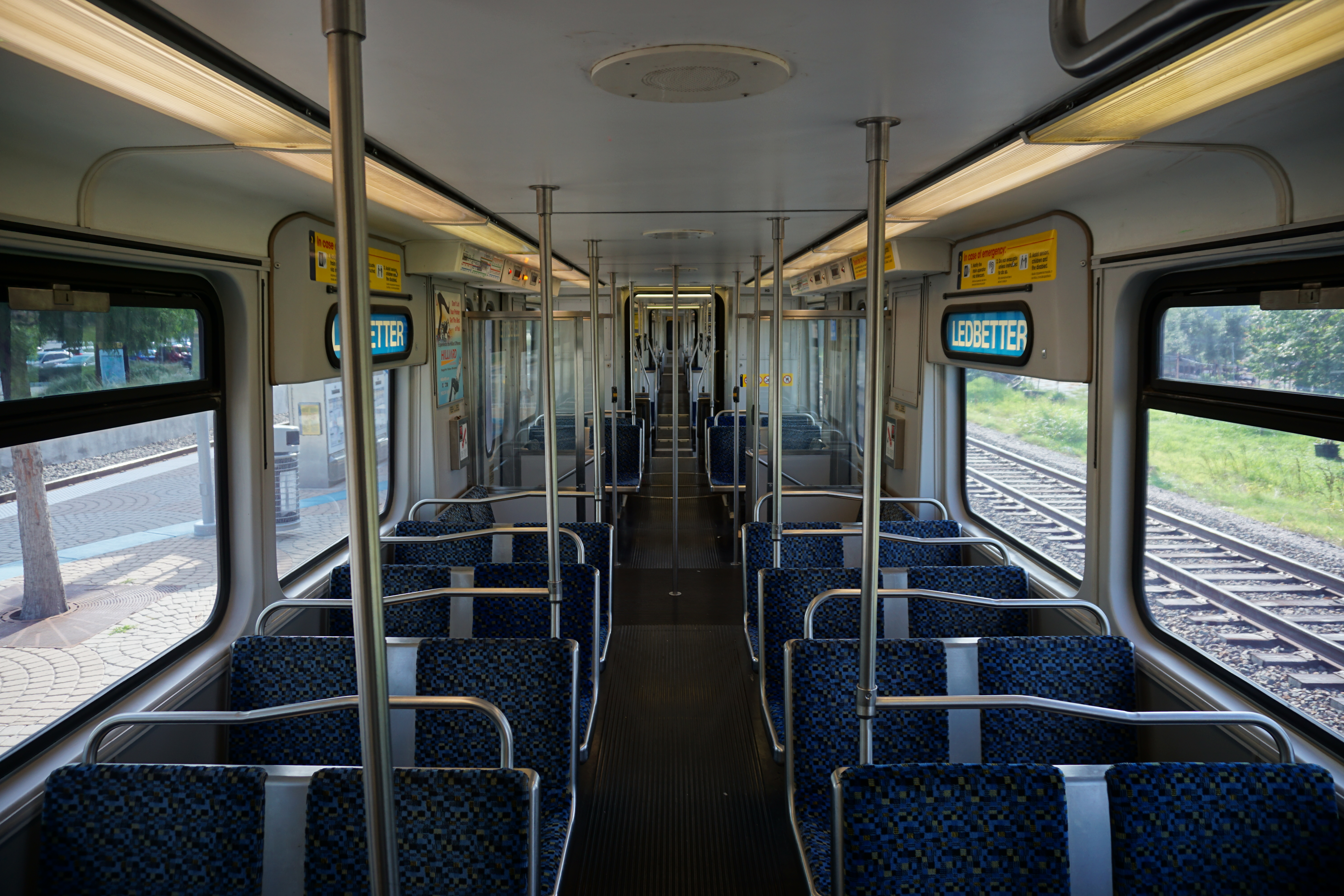
- In service: 1996–present
- Manufacturer: Kinki Sharyo
- Constructed: 1995–2013
- Entered service: June 14, 1996
- Refurbished: 2008–2010
- Number built: 163
- Capacity: 94 passengers (seated), 274 (crush load) per car
- Operator: DART
- Line served: All DART Light Rail lines

Specifications
- Car body construction: LAHT
- Train length: 494 ft (150,572 mm)
- Car length: 123.5 ft (37,643 mm)
- Width: 8.83 ft (2,692.4 mm)
- Height: 12.5 ft (3.81 m)
- Floor height: Low floor: 16 in (406 mm); High floor: 39.5 in (1,003 mm)
- Platform height: 16 in (406 mm)
- Entry: Level boarding and steps
- Doors: Sliding pocket type; 5 per side
- Articulated sections: 3 (two articulations)
- Wheel diameter: 28.0 in (711 mm)
- Wheelbase: Motor: 84 in (2,133 mm); Trailer: 70 in (1,778 mm)
- Maximum speed: 70 mph (112 km/h)
- Weight: 140,000 lb (64 t)
- Traction system: Original: AEG/Westinghouse GTO–VVVF; Upgraded: Toyo Denki IGBT–VVVF
- Traction motors: 4 × 3-phase AC induction motor: Original: AEG 190 hp (140 kW); Upgraded: Toyo Denki TDK6482-A 181 hp (135 kW)
- Power output: Original: 750 hp (560 kW); Upgraded: 720 hp (540 kW)
- Acceleration: 2.3 mph/s (1.0 m/s^{2})
- Deceleration: 3 mph/s (1.3 m/s^{2})
- Electric systems: Overhead line, 750 V DC
- Current collection: Pantograph
- UIC classification: Bo′(2)′(2)′Bo′
- AAR wheel arrangement: B-2-2-B
- Minimum turning radius: 82 ft (25 m)
- Coupling system: Tomlinson/Wabtec
- Track gauge: 4 ft 8 1/2 in (1,435 mm) standard gauge

The Kinki Sharyo Super Light Rail Vehicle (SLRV) is a light rail vehicle manufactured by Kinki Sharyo, operated by Dallas Area Rapid Transit (DART), and modified jointly by the two companies.

== Description ==
The SLRVs are longer and can accommodate more passengers than the Kinki Sharyo-built vehicles from which they were developed, known by DART as its standard Light Rail Vehicles (LRVs), which had been operated by DART rail since it began service in June 1996. DART's original LRVs were built as articulated, two-section cars with operator cabs at both ends.

The SLRVs were designed to both increase passenger capacity and to improve the accessibility of DART's light rail system. Each three-section, articulated SLRV measures 123.5 feet (37,643 millimeters) over couplers, while the maximum train length is four articulated cars coupled together, measuring 494 feet (150,572 mm) over couplers in total. An individual SLRV is 31 feet (9.4 m) longer and 33,000 pounds (15,000 kg) heavier than the standard LRVs from which they were developed, which were each 92 feet 8 inches (28.24 m) in length and weighed 107,000 pounds (49,000 kg). The SLRVs have a maximum speed of 70 miles per hour (112 kilometers per hour) and can accelerate at a rate of 2.3 mph per second (1.03 m/s^{2}).

== History ==
DART initially ordered 40 Kinkisharyo LRVs for service on the new Red and Blue lines. These were known as the Fleet 50 (101-140). The next 34 LRVs (141-174) were known as the Fleet 51 and arrived at DART's Central Rail Operations Facility (CROF) in 1998. DART also ordered 21 more LRVs, known as the Fleet 52 (175-195) alongside the Fleet 51s. Somewhere between 2000 and 2005 DART ordered the Fleet 53 (196-215) to complete the original fleet of 115 LRVs before the C Car was added.

Before the C Car was added onto the SLRVs, they ran as two-section LRTs with high floors. People with wheelchairs needed to use wheelchair ramps to get up to the train, which was extremely inconvenient. Thus, DART began to add a third section to go between the end cars, with low floor boarding and spots for wheelchair users.

== Partnership ==
Working in partnership, DART and Kinki Sharyo created the SLRVs by separating the existing two-section LRVs at their articulation joints and inserting an entirely new section in between, thereby rendering them three-section vehicles. The resulting SLRVs are double-articulated, eight-axle cars, in comparison to the single-articulated, six-axle design of the original LRVs. Each SLRV seats 98 passengers and can accommodate roughly 100 more standing passengers, which allows it to accommodate approximately 25 more seated people (and roughly 50 more overall) than a standard, two-section LRV.

The middle section, variously called "Body C", "C Unit", or "C Car", has a low floor and provides step-free access to the SLRV. It was designed primarily to allow passengers in wheelchairs, as well as those with strollers and bicycles, to embark and disembark more quickly and safely. Each SLRV middle section is also equipped with a bicycle rack.

== Prototype ==
In 2002, the prototype SLRV, car #170, began operating on DART's Blue Line. On June 23, 2008, car #151 became the first SLRV to enter revenue service. DART converted all 115 of its LRVs into SLRVs at a total cost of approximately $190 million, which was more cost effective than buying entirely new light rail vehicles. G. James Morgan of LTK Engineering Services estimated that DART saved over $50 million by converting its LRVs instead of buying new accessible vehicles.

Conversion of an individual LRV into an SLRV took roughly five weeks, with a sixth week for inspection and testing and the vehicle in main line operation by the next week. By March 2010, 84 of DART's 115 LRVs had been converted into SLRVs, and by August 2014, DART was operating a total of 163 SLRVs: all 115 converted LRVs in addition to 48 new vehicles (known as the Fleet 54).

DART also modified its light rail platforms between 2007 and 2010, raising some areas of the platforms and removing all raised wheelchair platforms located at the ends of the stations. This accommodated the greater overall length and low-floor middle sections of the SLRVs.

== LED Retrofits ==
As of late 2021, DART has been retrofitting its SLRVs with LED displays, replacing the original rollsigns that came with the SLRVs. Originally, SLRVs used a rollsign to display the destination, however the barcodes and the scanner would become dirty and would not read the sign correctly, causing them to get stuck in the wrong position. With the retrofitting of new LED signs, DART expects that destinations will be correctly displayed, eliminating passenger confusion.
