= Kintetsu 50000 series =

Japanese train type

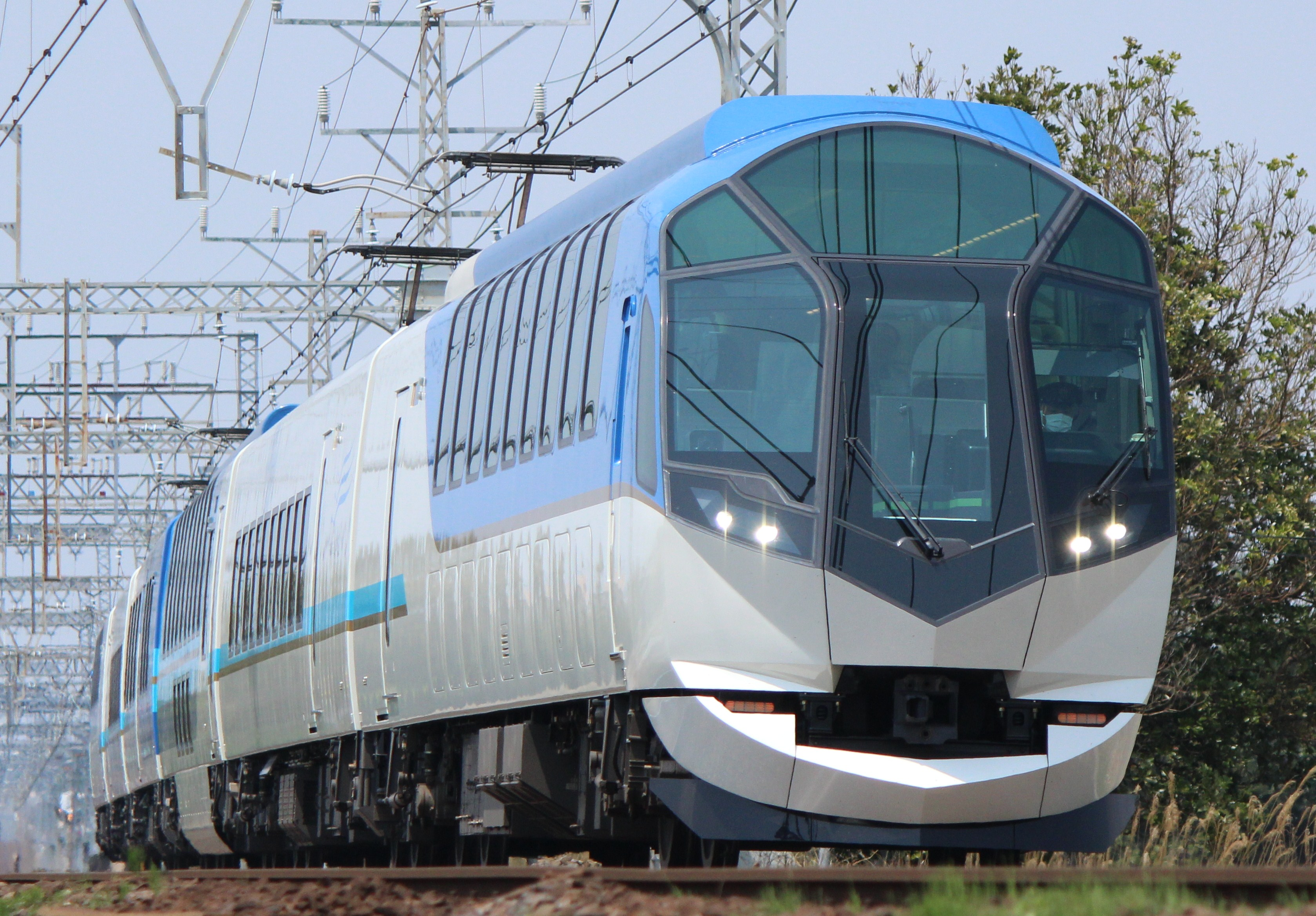
- A Kintetsu 50000 series EMU on a Shimakaze service, April 2013
- In service: 21 March 2013 – present
- Manufacturer: Kinki Sharyo
- Family name: Shimakaze
- Constructed: 2012–2014
- Number built: 18 vehicles (3 sets)
- Number in service: 18 vehicles (3 sets)
- Formation: 6 cars per trainset
- Fleet numbers: SV01 – SV03
- Operators: Kintetsu Railway

Specifications
- Car body construction: Steel
- Car length: 21,600 mm (70 ft 10 in) (end cars); 20,500 mm (67 ft 3 in) (intermediate cars)
- Width: 2,800 mm (9 ft 2 in)
- Height: 4,150 mm (13 ft 7 in)
- Doors: Plug doors (1 per side)
- Maximum speed: 130 km/h (80 mph)
- Traction system: 2-level PWM variable-frequency (using IGBT)
- Acceleration: 2.5 km/(h⋅s) (1.6 mph/s)
- Deceleration: 4.0 km/(h⋅s) (2.5 mph/s)
- Electric system(s): 1,500 V DC
- Current collection: Overhead line
- Bogies: KD-320 (motored), KD-320A (trailer)
- Safety system(s): ATS
- Track gauge: 1,435 mm (4 ft 8 1/2 in)

Notes/references
- This train won the 57th Blue Ribbon Award in 2014.

The Kintetsu 50000 series (近鉄50000系) is an electric multiple unit (EMU) train type operated by Japanese private railway operator Kintetsu Railway for use on luxury Shimakaze limited express services since March 2013.

== Operations ==
The trains entered revenue service from 21 March 2013 on daily Shimakaze limited express services from Ōsaka Namba and Kintetsu-Nagoya to Kashikojima on the Shima Line.

A special supplement is required to travel on these services, in addition to the basic fare and limited express charge. The 50000 series is one of the only normal service trains (as opposed to cruise trains and tourist excursions) to feature a dining car in Japan.

== Formation ==
The three six-car trains are formed as shown below.

| Car No. | 1 | 2 | 3 | 4 | 5 | 6 |
|---|---|---|---|---|---|---|
| Numbering | Ku 50600 | Mo 50500 | Sa 50400 | Mo 50300 | Mo 50200 | Ku 50100 |
| Capacity | 27 | 28 | 19 | 26 | 30 | 27 |
| Weight (t) | 44.0 | 49.0 | 39.0 | 47.0 | 49.0 | 44.0 |
| Facilities | – | WC | Cafeteria | WC, smoking compartment | WC | – |

Car 2 is fitted with two PT126-A single-arm pantographs, and cars 4 and 5 are each fitted with one.

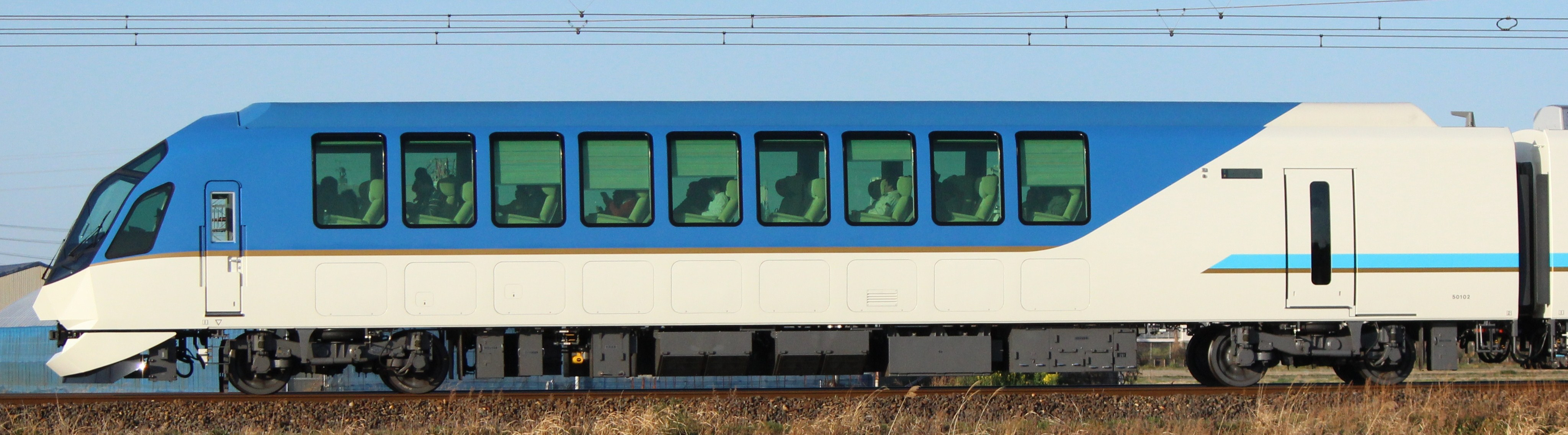
Ku 50102

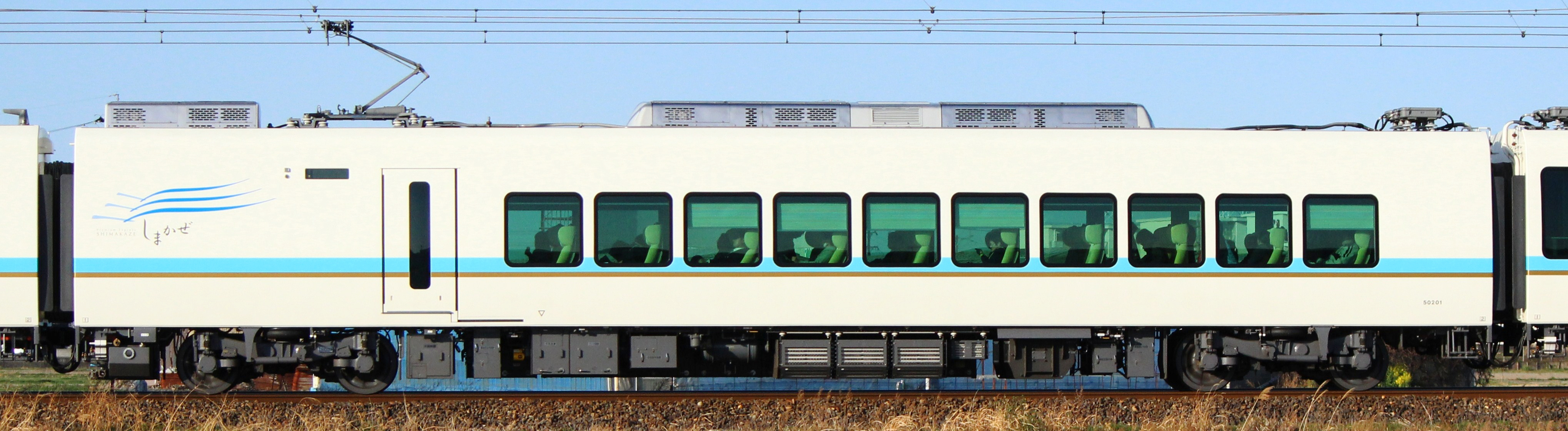
Mo 50202

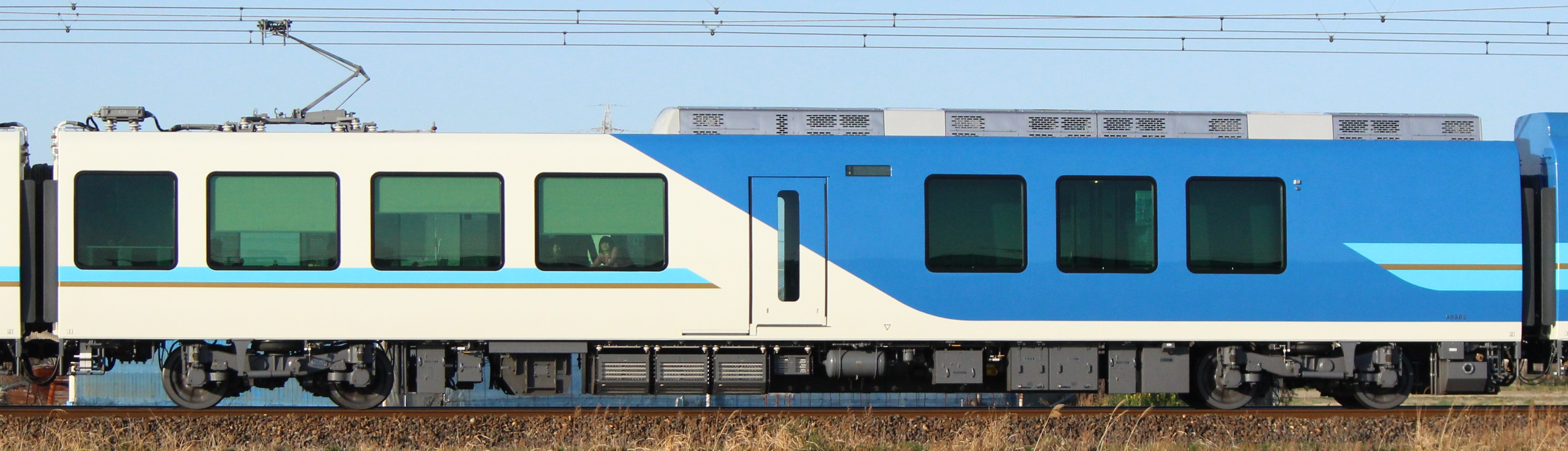
Mo 50302

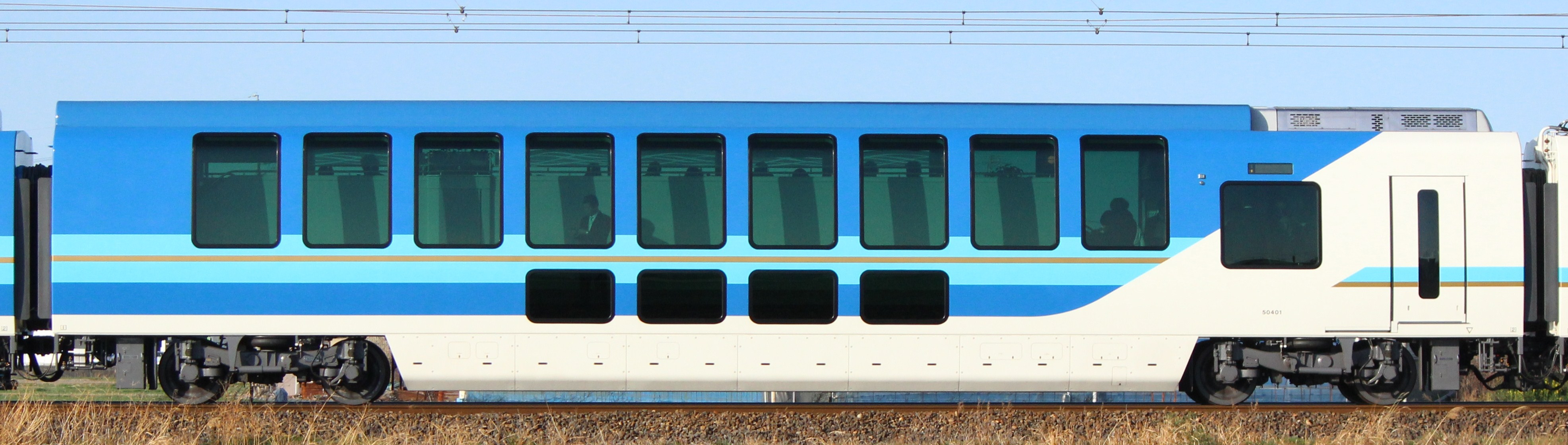
Sa 50402

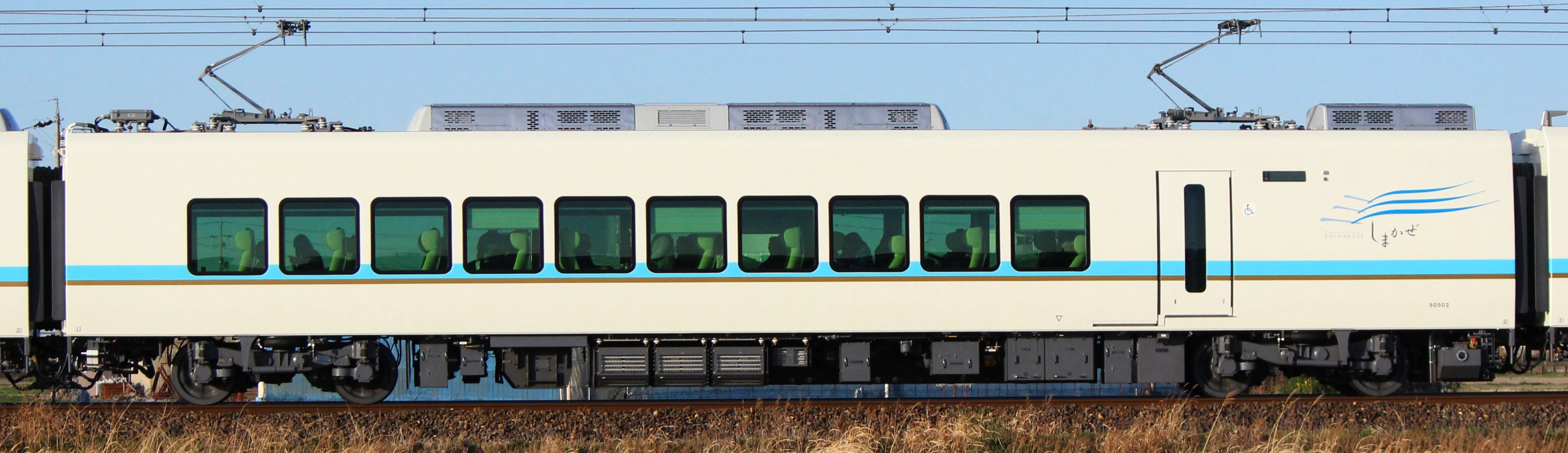
Mo 50502

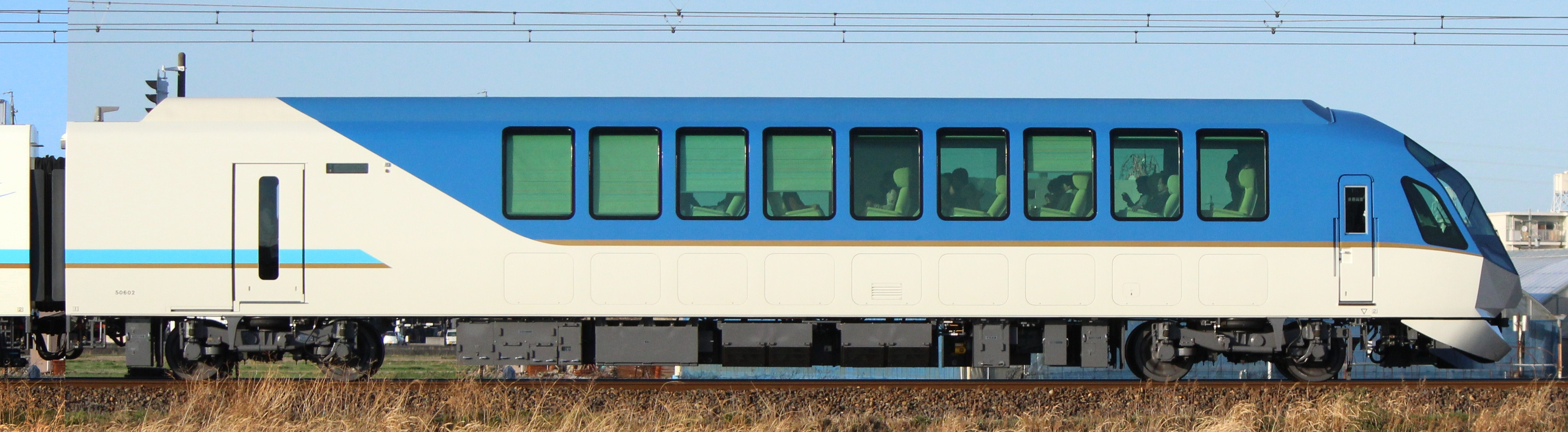
Ku 50602

== Interior ==
Seating in cars 1, 2, 5, and 6 is arranged 2+1 abreast, with a seat pitch of 1,250 mm (49 in). The seats are covered in cream-coloured leather and feature individual controls for lumbar support and an inflate/deflate feature to help customers relax. Car 3 features cafeteria seating on two levels (6 seats on the lower level and 13 on the upper level). The upper level of the car features a wave-pattern counter along one side of the car. A spacious wheelchair-accessible toilet features a changing board for passengers to stand on to change clothes. The car also features a powder room for female passengers. Car 4 features 4-person Japanese and western-style compartments and 6-person semi-open compartments.

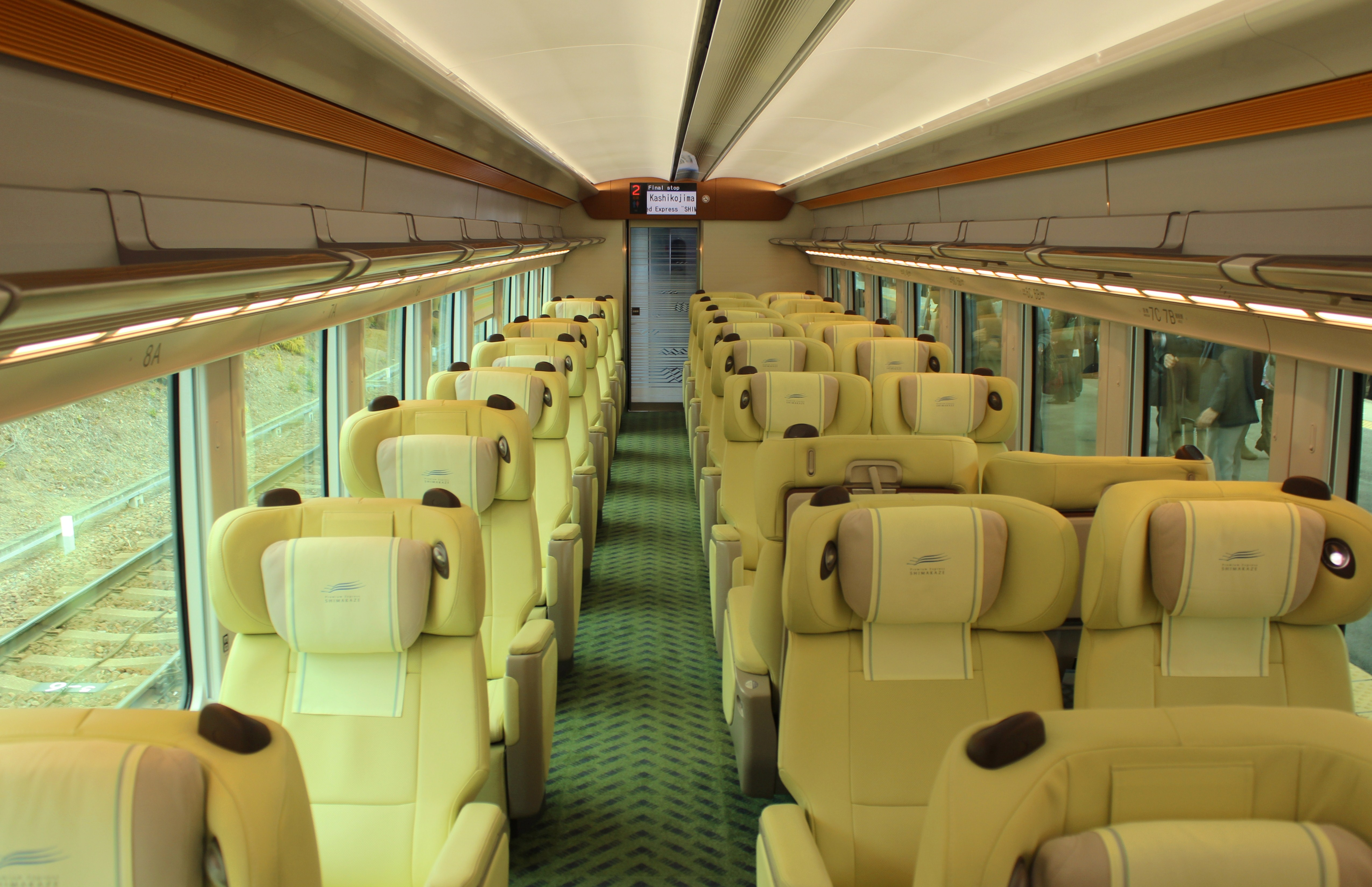
Open saloon seating

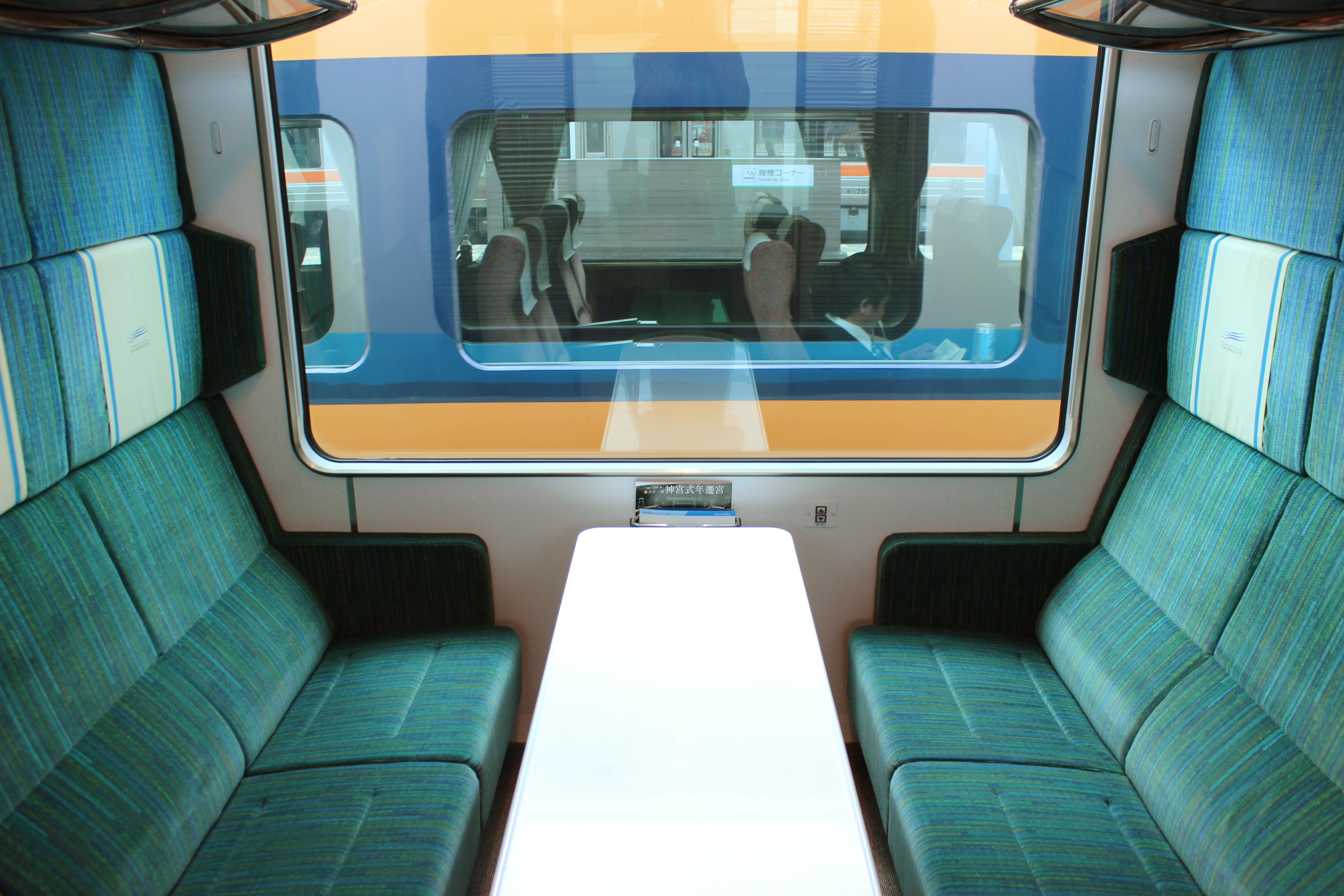
Compartment seating

== Exterior ==
The train is painted in a sky blue and crystal white livery, reminiscent of the Ise-Shima ocean resort region. The train is named for the Shima region, and kaze, Japanese for "wind".

== Bogies ==
The trains run on bolsterless bogies with full active suspension. The motored bogies are designated KD-320, and the trailer bogies are designated KD-320A.

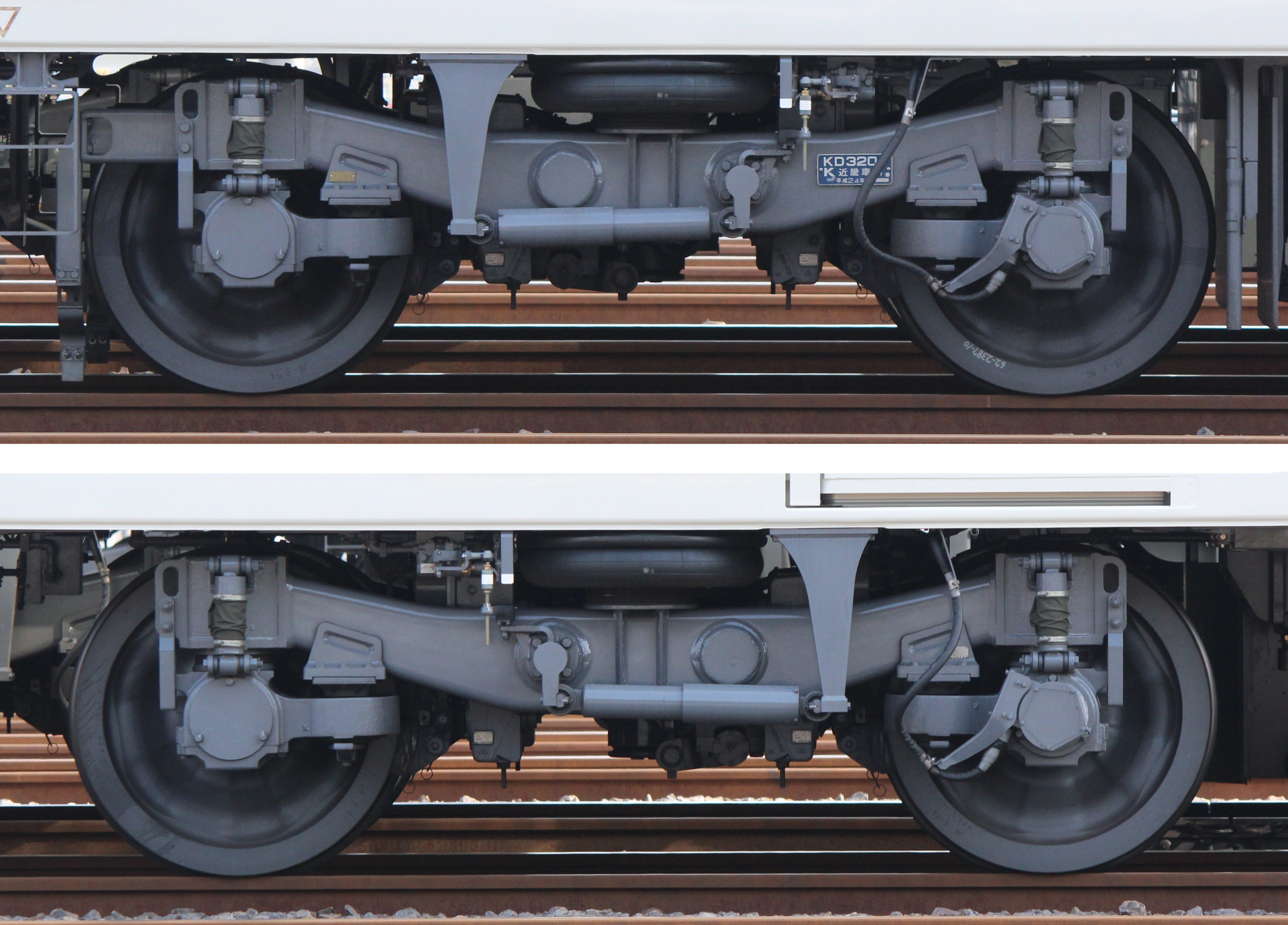
Motored KD-320 bogie (top) and trailer KD-320A bogie (bottom)

== History ==
Starting in 2009, market research was conducted to help design the train; over 14,000 people were asked for their opinion. The study showed that over 60% of visitors to the region were female; this information was used to add the fitting boards and powder rooms to the design. The first 50000 series set was delivered from Kinki Sharyo in September 2012. The two trainsets entered revenue service on 21 March 2013. In May 2014, the 50000 series was awarded the 2014 Blue Ribbon Award, presented annually by the Japan Railfan Club. A presentation ceremony was held on 20 September 2014 at Kyoto Station.

A third set entered service in October 2014.
