= Kintetsu 16200 series =

Japanese train type

Kintetsu 16200 series Blue Symphony
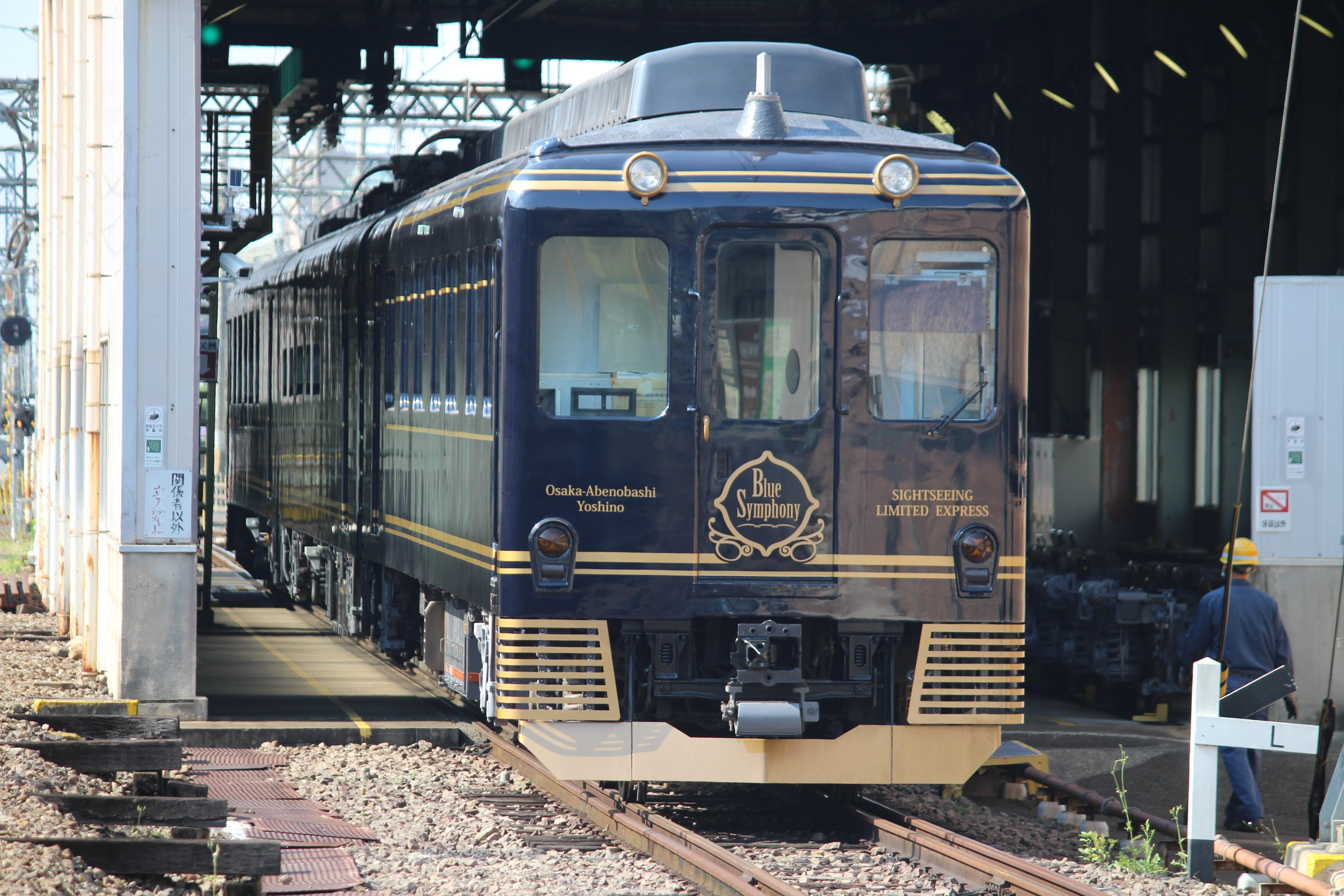
- In service: September 2016–
- Constructed: 1978 (as 6200 series)
- Refurbished: 2016
- Number built: 3 vehicles (1 set)
- Number in service: 3 vehicles (1 set)
- Formation: 3 cars per trainset
- Fleet numbers: SY01
- Operator: Kintetsu Railway
- Lines served: Minami Osaka Line; Yoshino Line

Specifications
- Car body construction: Steel
- Car length: 20,720 mm (68 ft 0 in)
- Width: 2,740 mm (9 ft 0 in)
- Height: 4,150 mm (13 ft 7 in)
- Doors: 1 sliding door per side
- Maximum speed: 110 km/h (70 mph)
- Traction system: Resistor control
- Acceleration: 2.5 km/(h⋅s) (1.6 mph/s)
- Deceleration: 4.0 km/(h⋅s) (2.5 mph/s)
- Electric system: 1,500 V DC, overhead line
- Current collection: Pantograph
- Track gauge: 1,067 mm (3 ft 6 in)

The Kintetsu 16200 series (近鉄16200系), branded Blue Symphony (青の交響曲, Ao no Shinfonii) is a limited express electric multiple unit (EMU) train type operated by the private railway operator Kintetsu Railway in Japan since September 2016. The train was converted from a 6200 series commuter train.

== Design ==
The train was converted from a former 6200 series commuter train built in 1978.

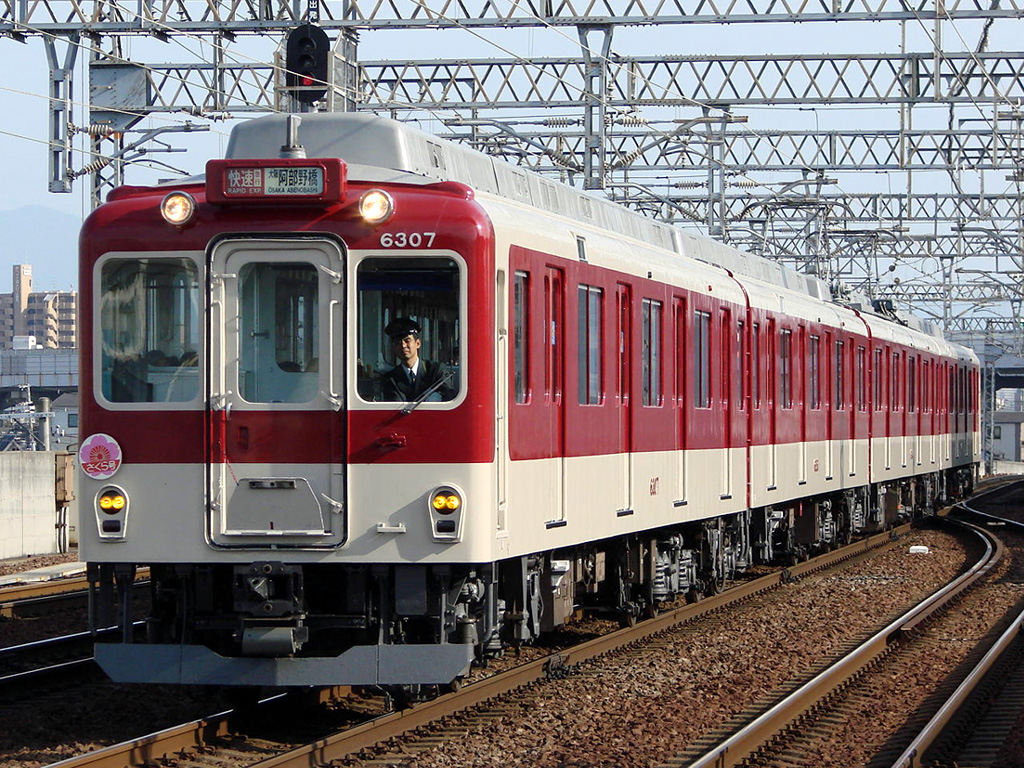
A 6200 series commuter trainset

== Operations ==
The train operates between Ōsaka Abenobashi on the Minami Osaka Line and Yoshino on the Yoshino Line, making two return trips each day.

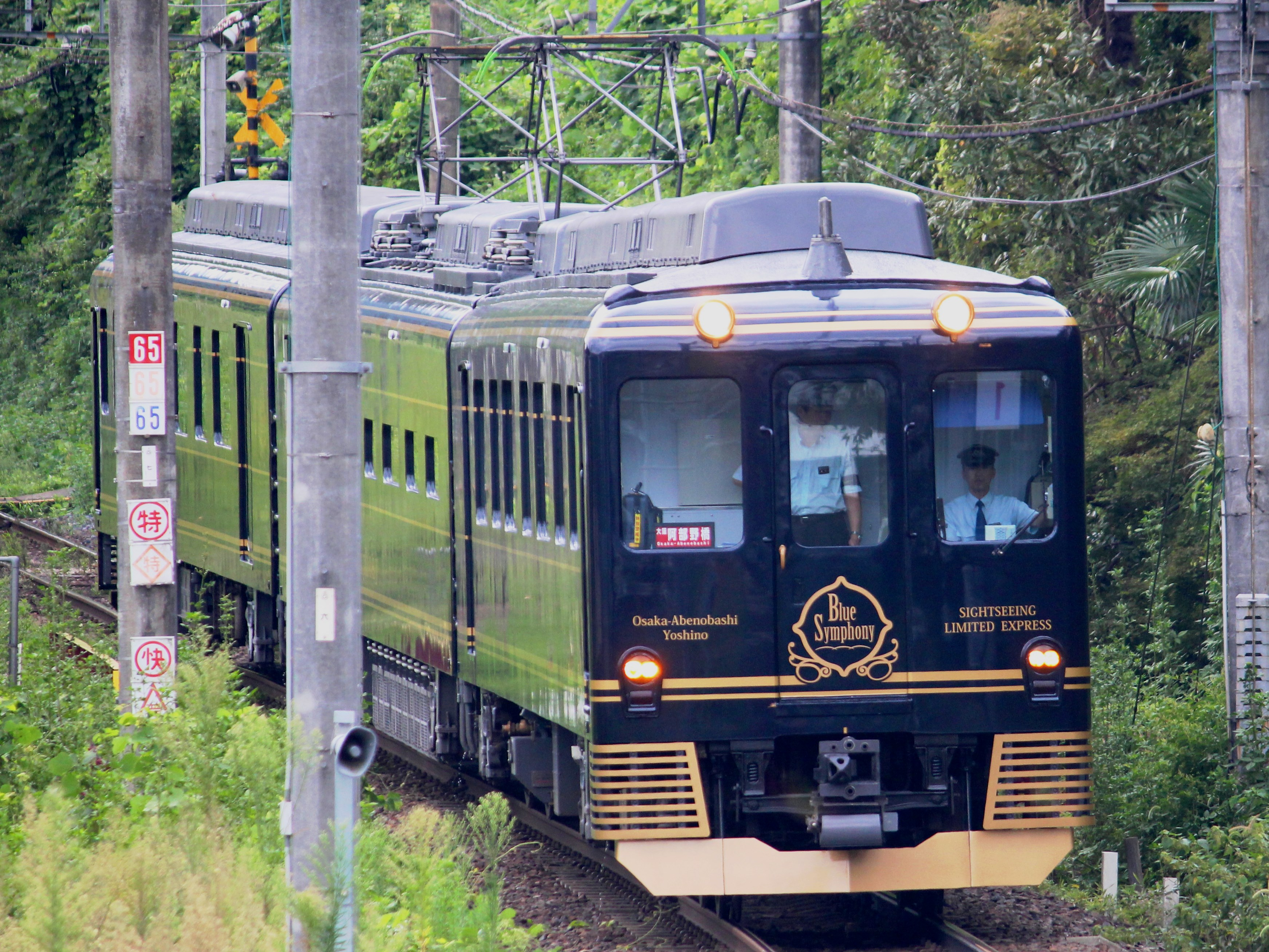
The train in service in September 2016

== Formation ==
The three-car train is formed as follows.

Car No.	1	2	3
Designation	Tc	M	Mc
Numbering	16301	16251	16201
Weight (t)	33.0	43.0	44.0
Capacity	28	20	37
Facilities	Seating; Universal access toilet	Bar counter lounge space library	Seating

== History ==
The conversion work on the train was completed in July 2016, and the train entered service on 10 September 2016.
