= Kinki Sharyo =

Japanese rolling stock manufacturer

Kinki Sharyo Co., Ltd.
- Native name: 近畿車輛株式会社
- Romanized name: Kinki Sharyō kabushiki gaisha
- Type: Public
- Traded as: TYO: 7122
- Industry: Rolling stock manufacturing
- Founded: December 19, 1920; 105 years ago
- Headquarters: Osaka, Japan
- Key people: Itsuo Morishita (President)
- Number of employees: 1,000
- Parent: Kintetsu Group Holdings Co.: 14.2% direct ownership; another 30.4% through Kintetsu Railway, held as investment trust managed by MTBJ
- Website: www.kinkisharyo.co.jp/english/

Kinki Sharyo Co., Ltd. (近畿車輛株式会社, Kinki Sharyō kabushiki gaisha) is a Japanese manufacturer of railroad vehicles based in Osaka. It is an affiliate company of Kintetsu Corporation. In business since 1920 as Tanaka Rolling Stock Works, and renamed The Kinki Sharyo Co., Ltd in 1945, they produce rolling stock for numerous transportation agencies, ranging from Shinkansen high-speed trains to light rail vehicles. Kinki Sharyo is listed on the Tokyo Stock Exchange as TYO: 7122.

== Clients ==
=== North America ===
- Mexico's Ferrocarriles Nacionales de México

==== United States ====
- MBTA Green Line (Type 7)
- Los Angeles Metro Rail (P3010)
- New Jersey Transit Hudson-Bergen and Newark Light Rail
- VTA light rail
- Valley Metro Rail
- Sound Transit: Link light rail Series 1 vehicles (162 total)
- DART rail (SLRV)
Kinki Sharyo rail vehicles in the United States

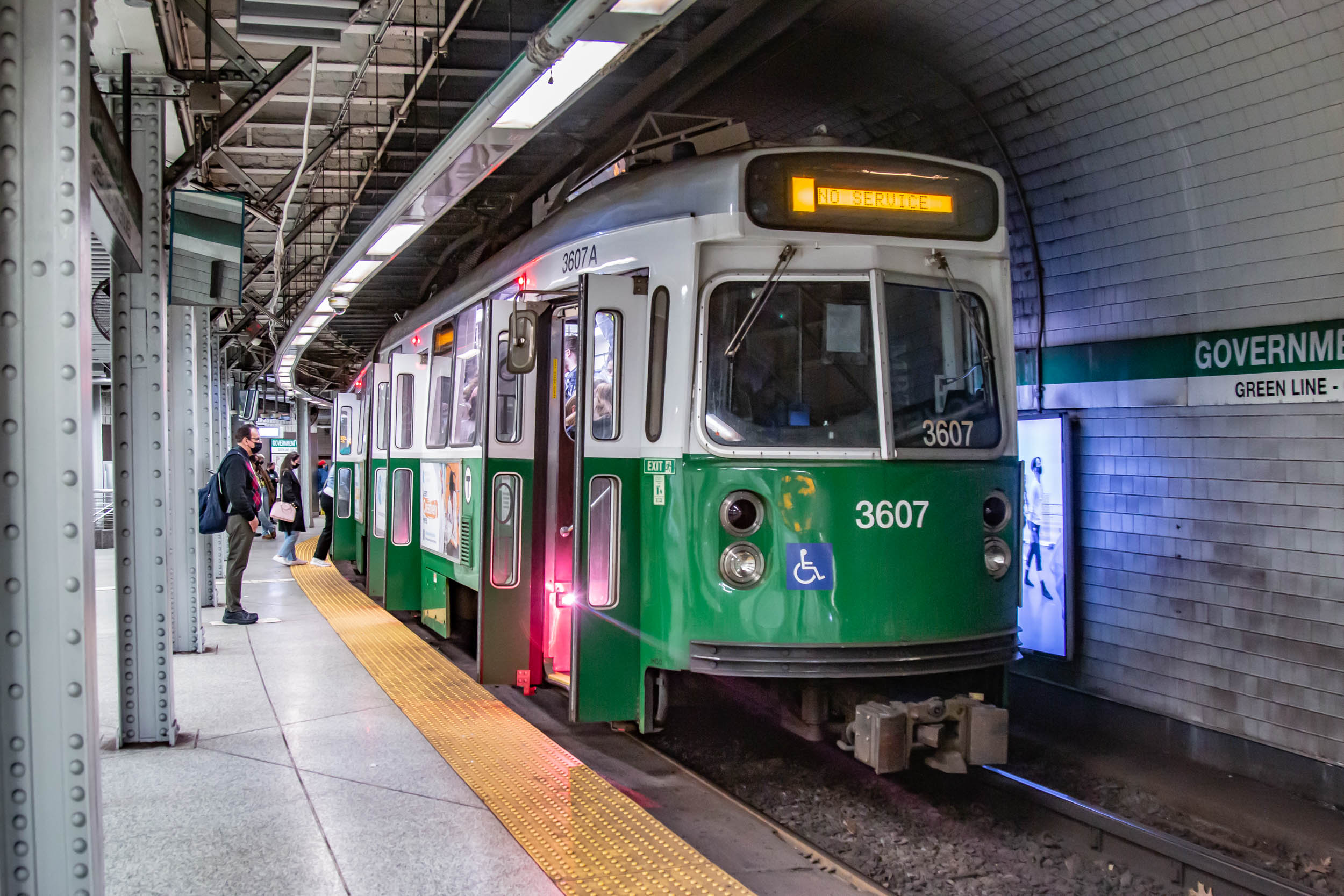
Kinki Sharyo Type 7 on the MBTA Green Line in Boston

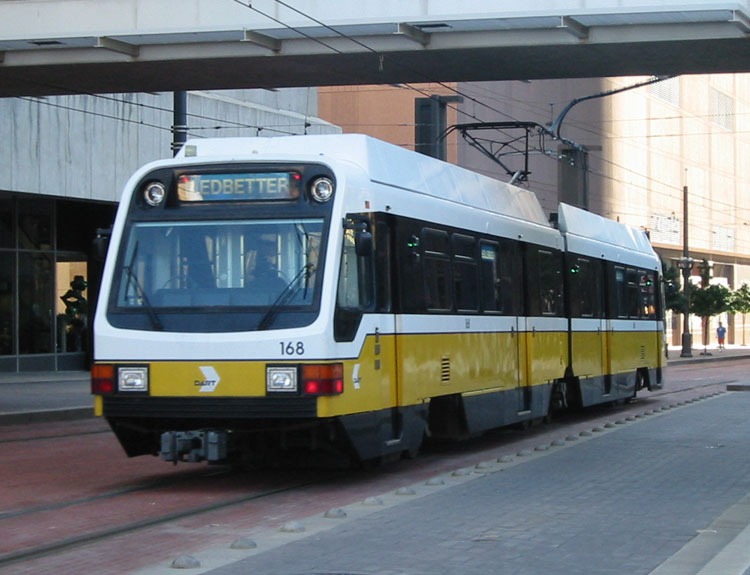
SLRV operated by Dallas Area Rapid Transit

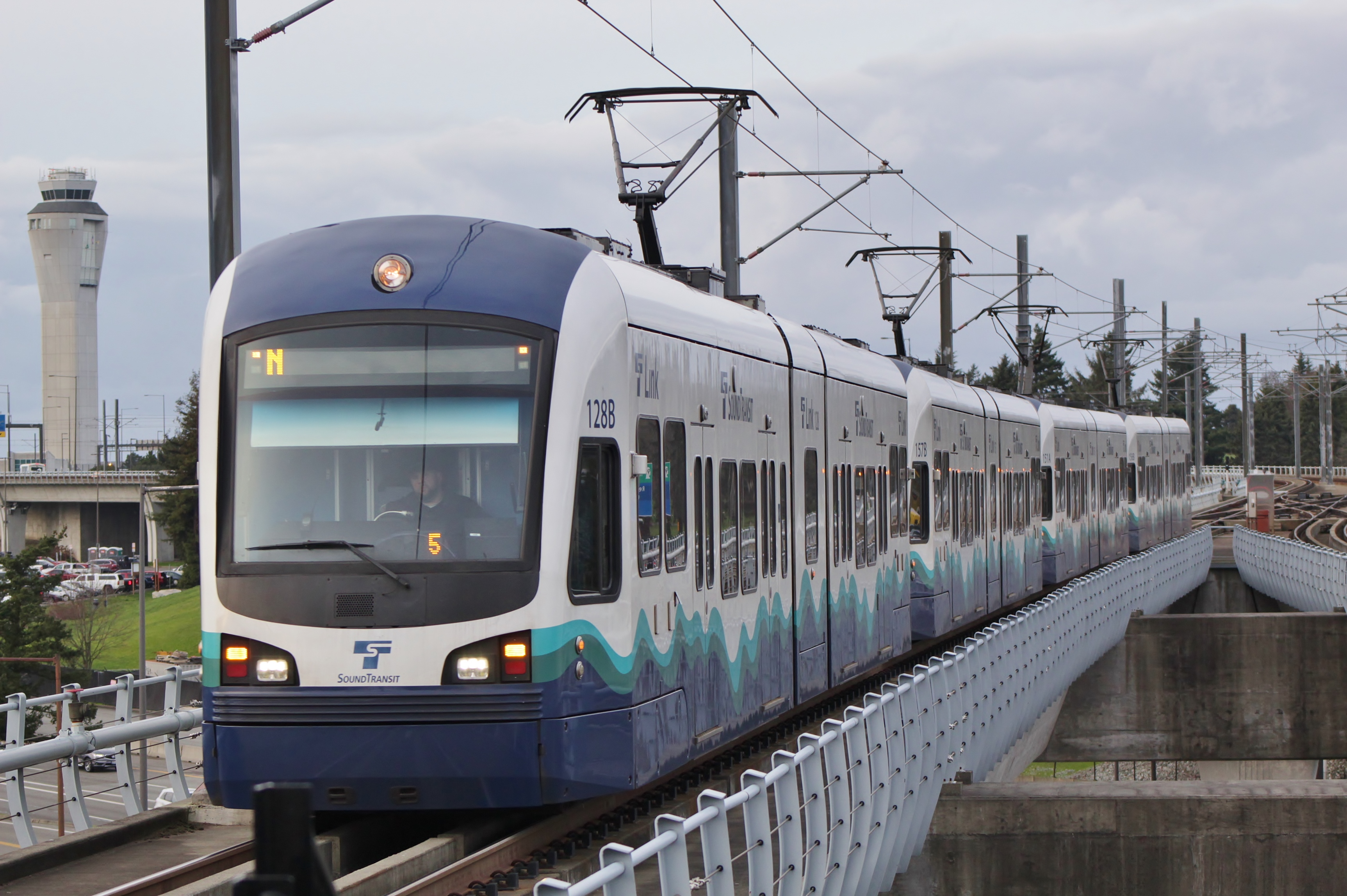
Link light rail in the Seattle area

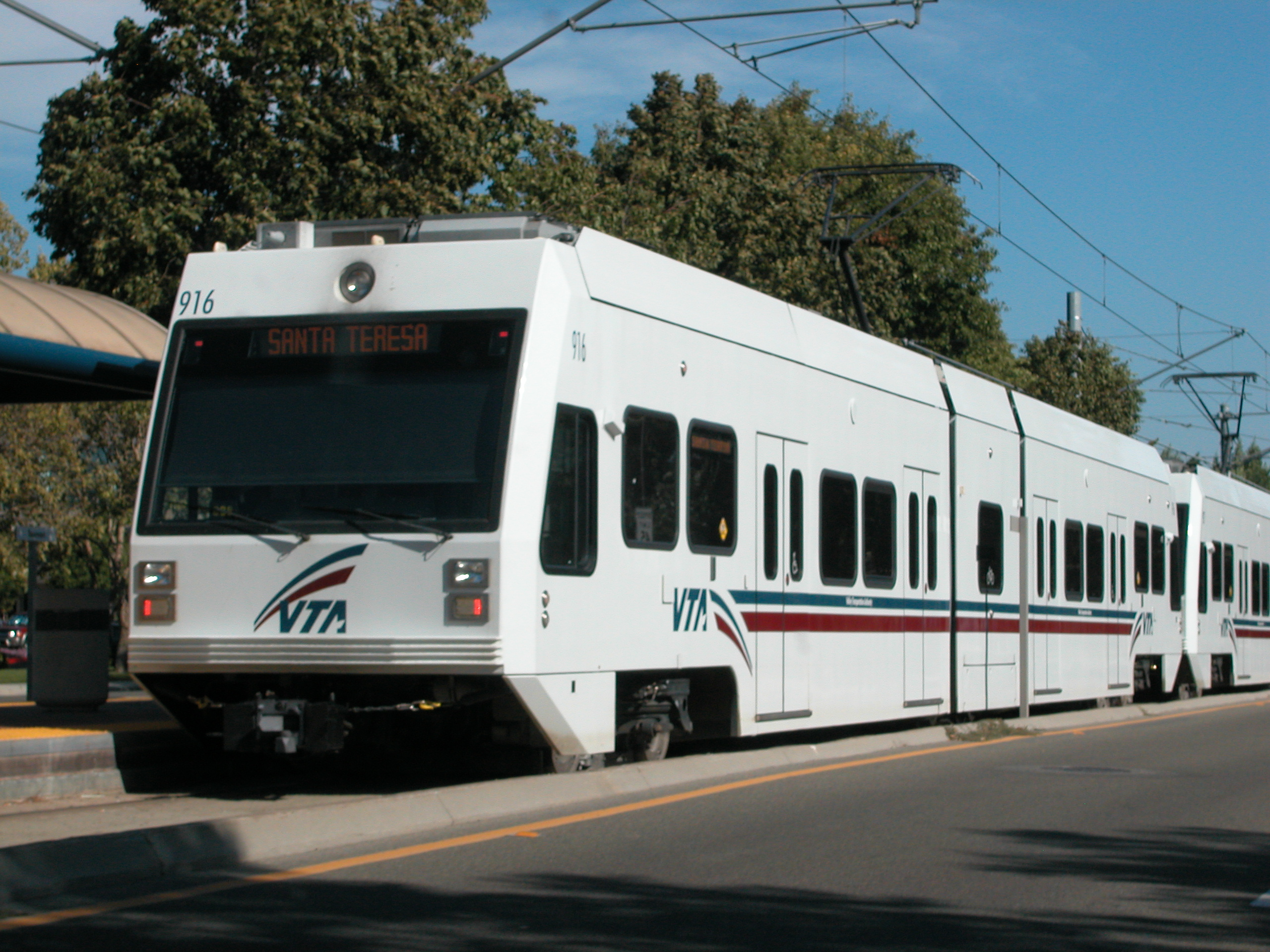
Low-floor LRV used by VTA light rail in San Jose, California

=== Asia ===
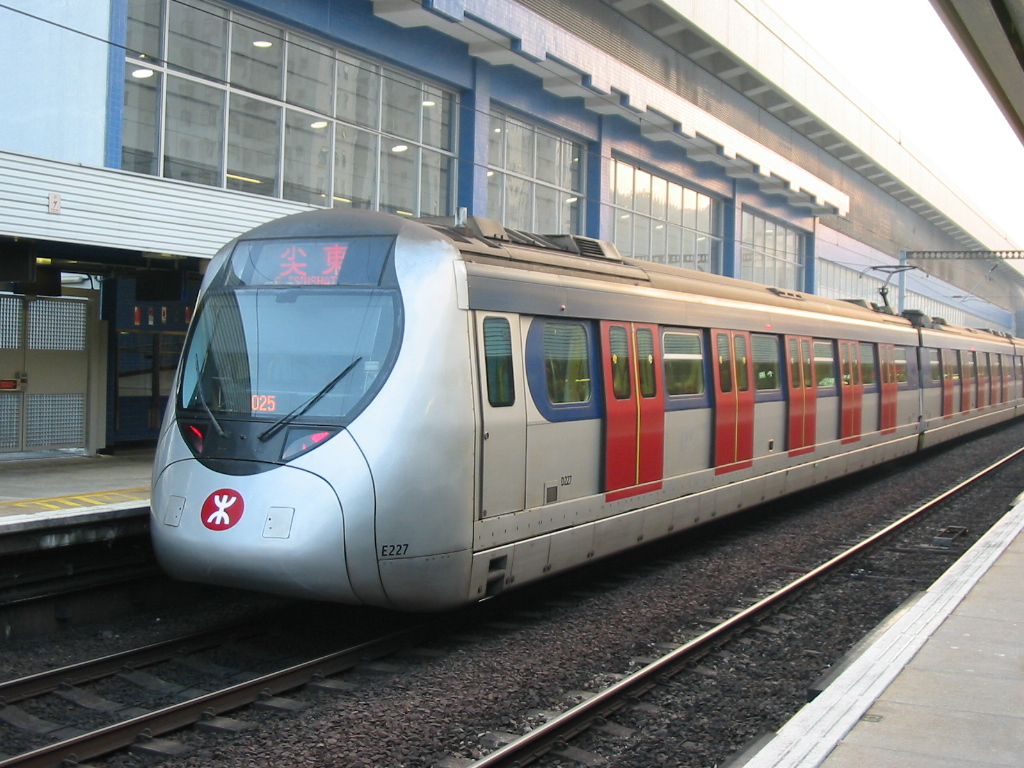
Hong Kong MTR SP1900 at Tai Wai

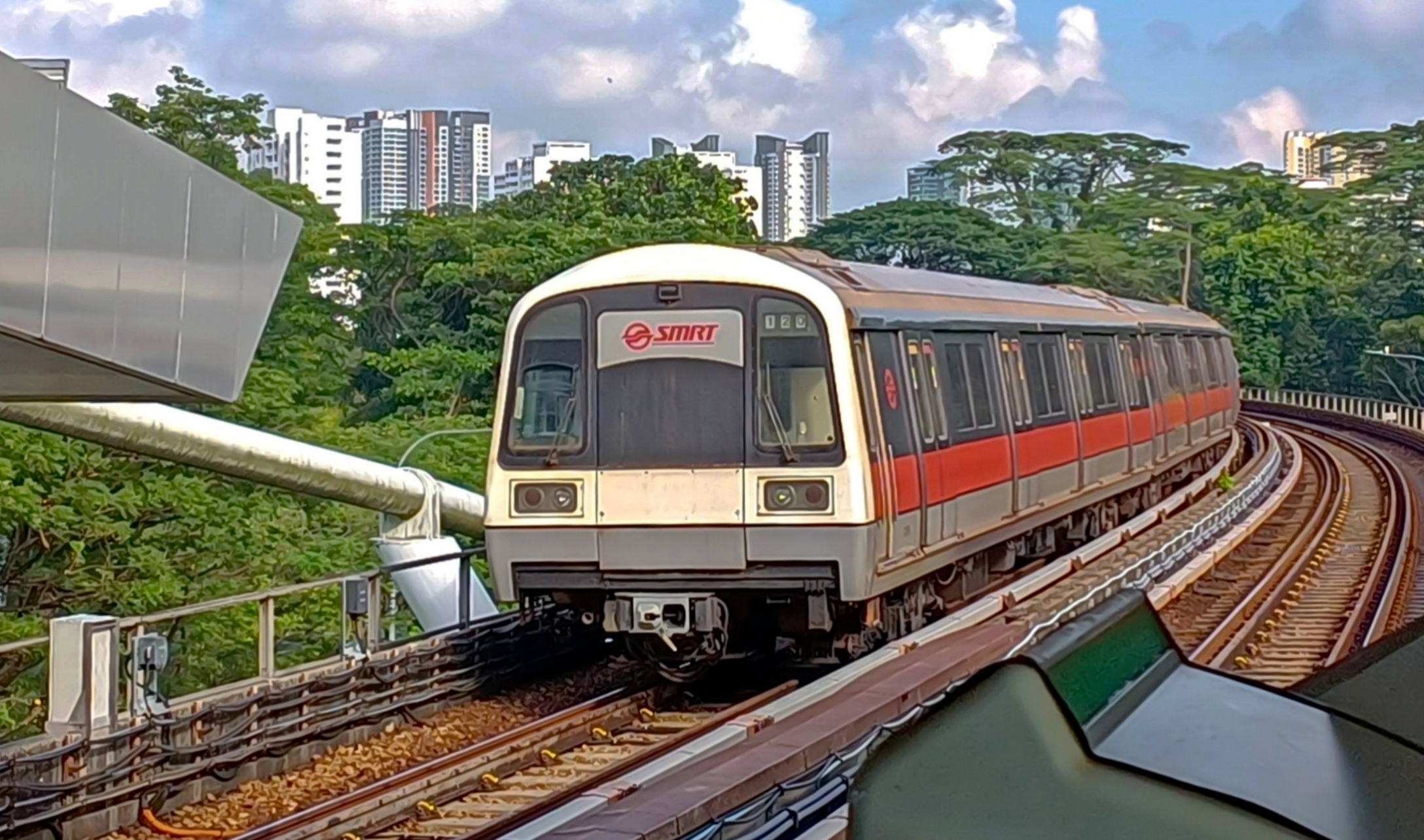
Singapore C151 Train on the Singapore MRT

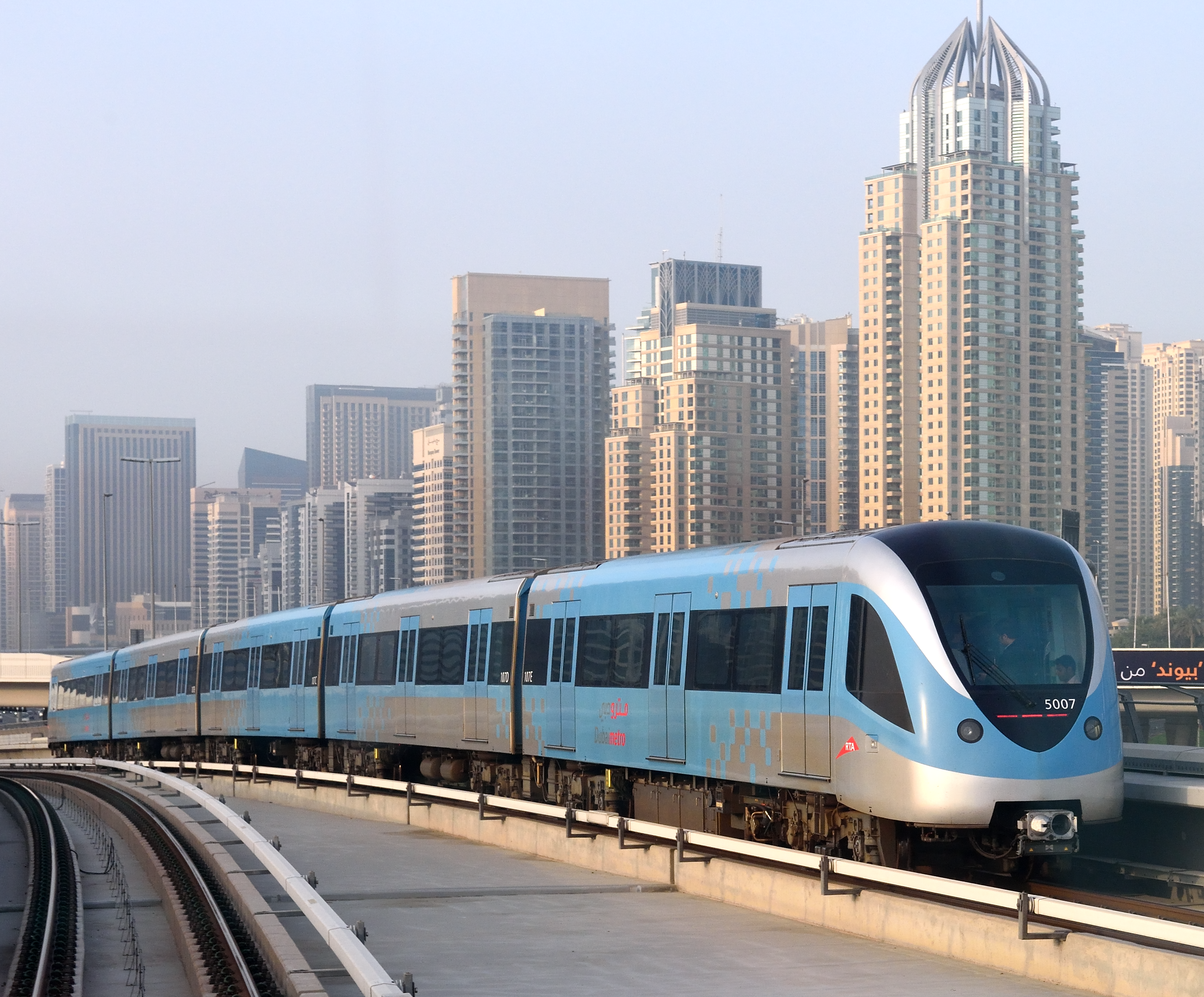
Dubai Metro runs the Kinki Sharyo trains primarily on the Red Line of the metro, while the Green Line runs mostly Alstom trains.

- Hong Kong's Kowloon–Canton Railway (merged with Mass Transit Railway in 2007.)
  - Premium Class T1 and T2 bi-level coaches for Guangdong Through Train, also known as KTT.
  - SP1900/1950 EMU, serving the Tuen Ma line, and formerly the West Rail, Ma On Shan, and East Rail lines
    - Extra SP1000/1950 carriages for the Sha Tin to Central Link, ordered 2014.
- Philippines
  - Light Rail Transit Authority & Light Rail Manila Corporation (Manila LRT Line 1)
    - Class 1200 LRV (joint venture with Nippon Sharyo)
- Qatar
  - Doha Metro
- Singapore
  - Mass Rapid Transit (Singapore)
    - Kawasaki Heavy Industries C151
- United Arab Emirates
  - Dubai Metro
    - Dubai Metro Green Line & Dubai Metro Red Line

==== Japan ====
- JR Group
- Kintetsu
- Hanshin Electric Railway
- Nankai Electric Railway
- Osaka Municipal Transportation Bureau
- Sendai City Transportation Bureau

=== Africa ===
- Egypt: CairoMetro
- Egypt: Alexandria ramel tram

=== Australia ===
- Trans-Australian Express train coaches.

=== South America ===
- Argentina: Operadora Ferroviaria Sociedad del Estado Roca Line

== Products ==
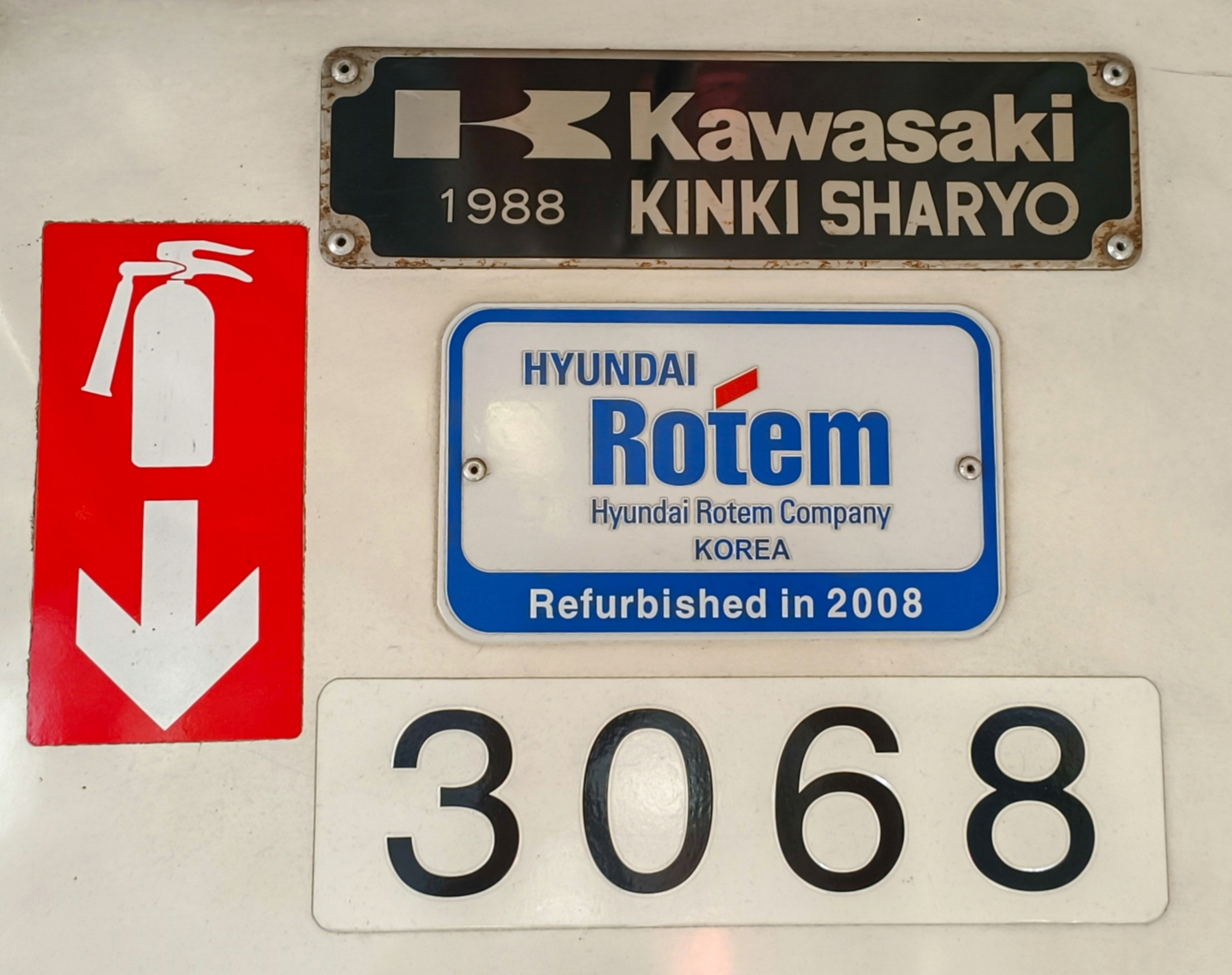
1988 Kawasaki-Kinki Sharyo builder's plate on a C151 Train from Singapore MRT

Kinki Sharyo also produces steel doors, known as the KJ series, for public housing in Japan.

- LRTA Line 1 Manila, Philippines
  - LRTA Class 1200
- Railway cars in the United States
  - Unnamed Low Floor LRV – Santa Clara County, California
  - Green Line (MBTA) Type 7 Light Rail Vehicle – Boston, Massachusetts
  - HB Series (informal name) low-floor light rail vehicle – Hudson-Bergen Light Rail Newark & Hudson County, New Jersey
  - Super LRV (semi-formal name for rebuilt product) – Dallas, Texas
  - Kinkisharyo-Mitsui LF LRV – Sound Transit Link light rail, Seattle, Washington
  - Valley Metro Rail LF LRV – Phoenix, Arizona (entered service 2008)
  - LFX-300 – marketed as ameriTRAM and tested on Charlotte Area Transit System network in 2011.
  - P3010 – LA Metro, Los Angeles, California
  - Refurbishment of the Hitachi Rail CQ311 used by MARTA
  - Refurbishment of the AnsaldoBreda P2550 used by Los Angeles Metro
- Cairo Metro
  - M, N1 and N2 Cars for No.1 Line
  - M, N1, N2 and T Cars for No.2 Line
- KCR in Hong Kong (merged with MTR in 2007)
  - EMU SP1900/SP1950
  - KTT passenger coaches for Guangdong Through Train
    - T1 Premium Class bi-level Coaches
    - T2 First Class bi-level Coaches
- Ferrocarriles Argentinos
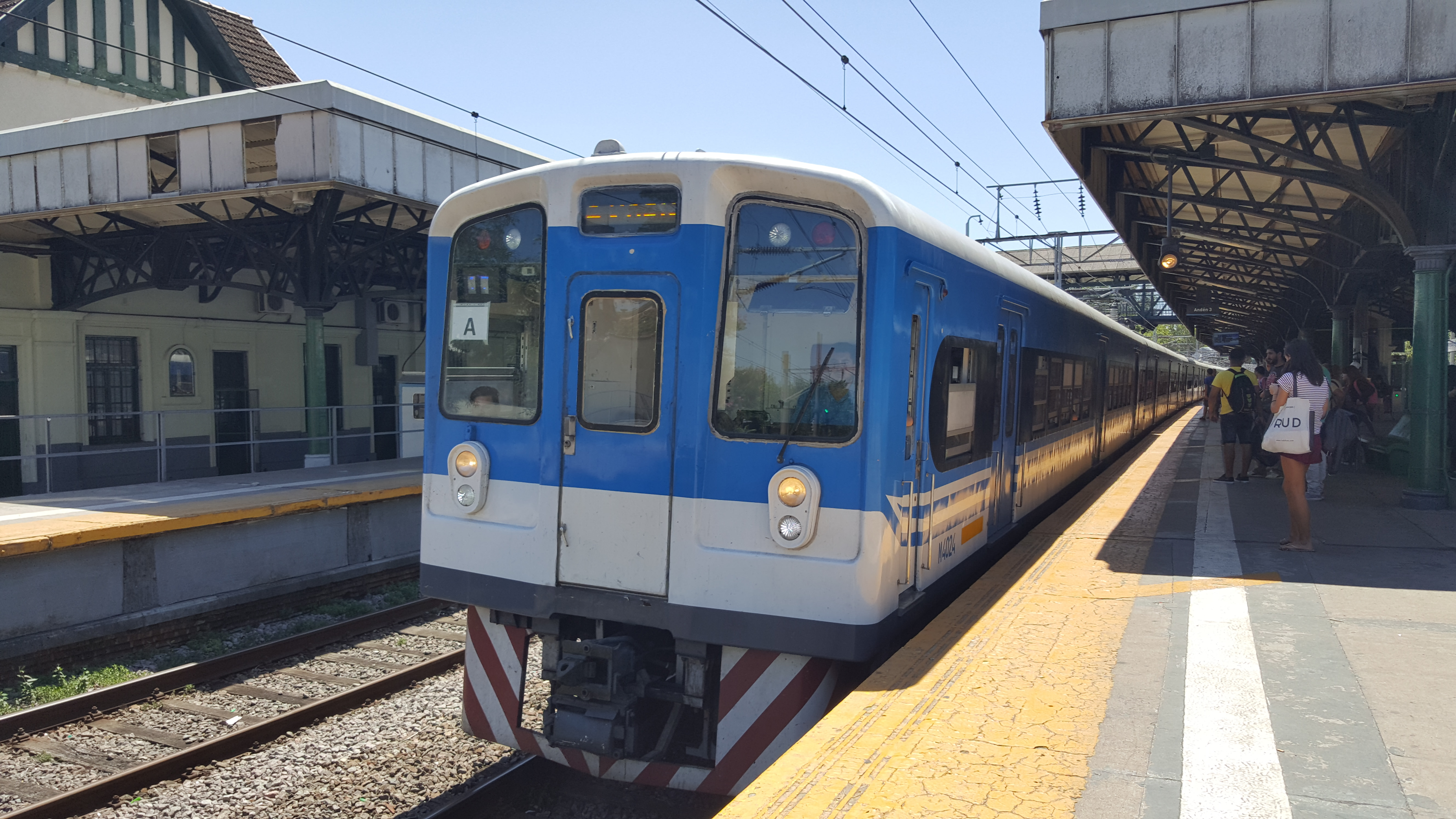
  - EMU Linea Roca Argentina
    Sub-urban "Toshiba" EMUs of Buenos Aires, Argentina (with Toshiba's electrical equipments)
    - For Sarmiento Line
    - For Mitre Line
    - For Urquiza Line
    - For Roca Line
- JR Group
  - Shinkansen (West Japan Railway)
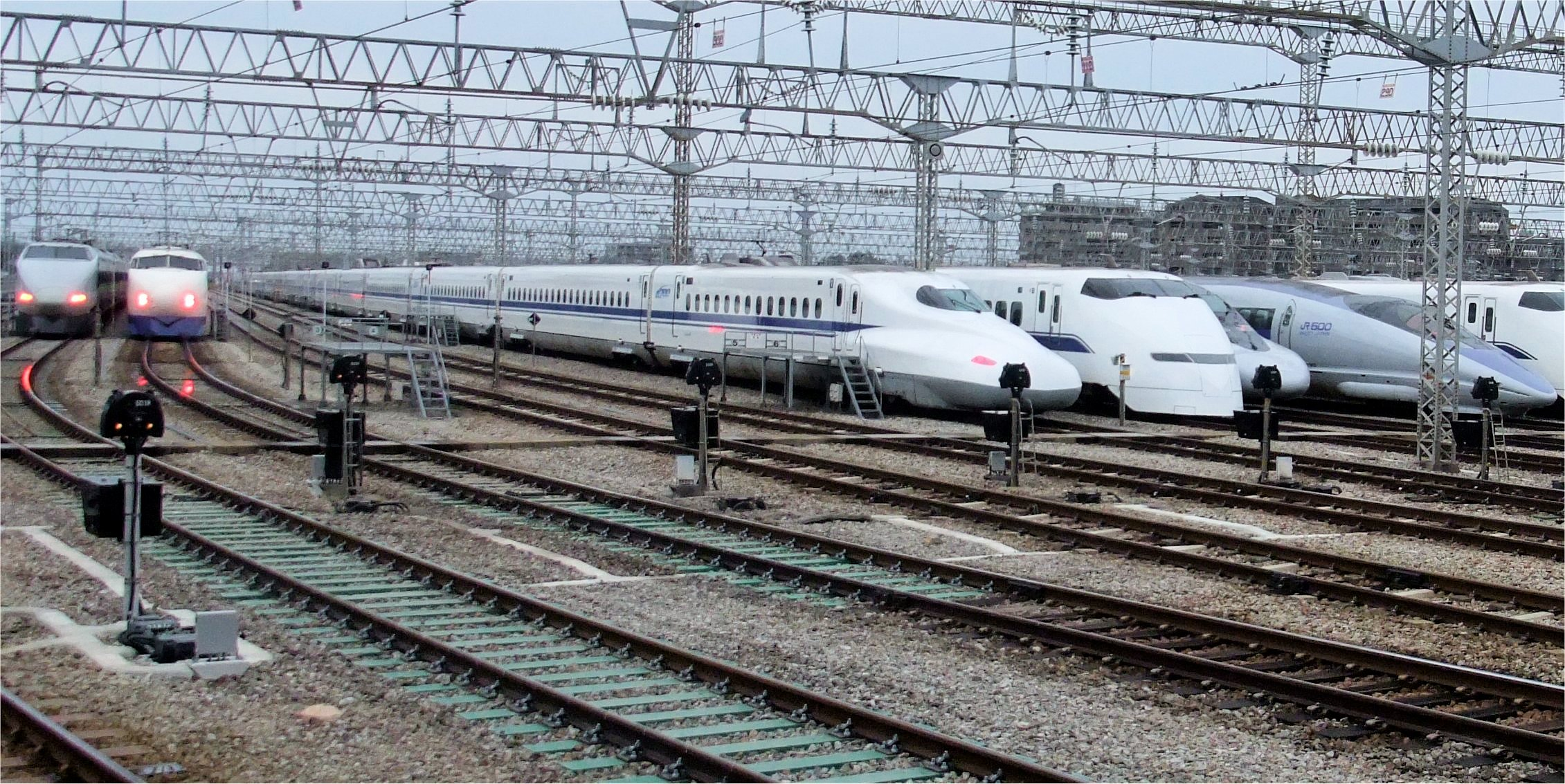
    - Lineup of JR West Shinkansen trains, October 2008
      W7 Series Shinkansen
    - N700 Series Shinkansen
    - 700 Series (Rail-Star) Shinkansen
    - 500 Series Shinkansen
    - 100 Series (Grand Hikari) Shinkansen
  - Shinkansen (Central Japan Railway)
    - 300 Series Shinkansen
    - 100 Series Shinkansen
  - Shinkansen (Kyushu Railway)
    - N700 Series Shinkansen
  - JR Central
    - 313 series – Central Japan Railway Suburban Electric Train
  - JR East
    - E257 series – East Japan Railway Limited Express
  - JR West
    - 223 series – West Japan Railway Suburban Electric Train
    - 225 series – West Japan Railway Suburban Electric Train
    - 227 series – West Japan Railway Suburban Electric Train
    - 271 series – West Japan Railway limited express train
    - 273 series – West Japan Railway limited express train
    - 287 series – West Japan Railway limited express train
    - 285 series – West Japan Railway and Central Japan Railway Electric Sleeping car
    - 321 series – West Japan Railway Commuter Electric Train
    - 323 series – West Japan Railway Commuter Electric Train
    - 681 series – West Japan Railway Company and Hokuetsu Express Limited Express
    - 683 series – West Japan Railway Limited Express
    - 87 series (KiITe 87, KiSaINe 86-501, KiRa 86, KiShi 86) – West Japan Railway Diesel Sleeping car
  - JR Shikoku
    - 7000 series – Shikoku Railway Suburban Electric Train
    - 1500 series – Shikoku Railway Diesel Train
  - JR Kyushu
    - 303 series – Kyushu Railway Commuter Electric Train
    - 813 series – Kyushu Railway Suburban Electric Train
- Private Railways in Japan
  - Kintetsu Railway
    - Double decker cars "Vista Car" – Kintetsu
    - 21020 series – Limited Express Electric Train "Urban Liner Next"
    - 23000 series – Limited Express Electric Train "Ise-Shima Liner"
    - 22600 series/16600 Series – Limited Express Electric Train "Ace"
    - 50000 series – Limited Express Electric Train "Shimakaze"
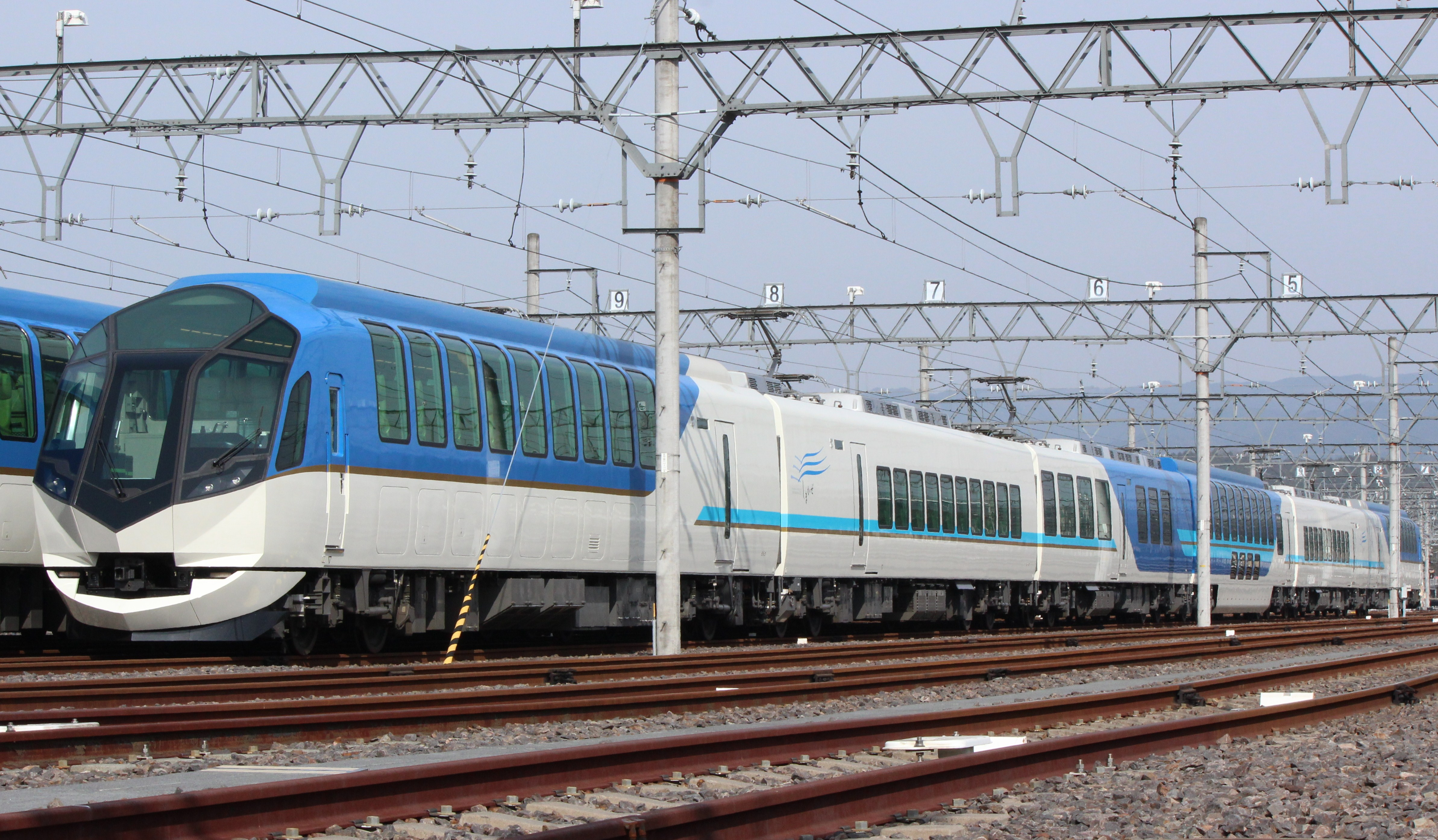
      Kinki Sharyo built Kintetsu 50000 series EMU
    - 3220, 5820, 6820, 9020 and 9820 Series – "Series 21" Commuter Electric Car
  - Hanshin Electric Railway
    - 1000 series – Commuter Train
    - 5700 series – Commuter Train
  - Nankai Electric Railway
    - 8300 series – Commuter Train
  - Kita-Osaka Kyuko Railway
    - 9000 series – Electric Train
- Municipal Railways in Japan
  - Kyoto Municipal Transportation Bureau
    - 10 series – Subway train for the Karasuma Line
    - 20 series – Subway train for the Karasuma Line
    - 50 series – Subway train for the Tozai Line
  - Osaka Municipal Transportation Bureau / Osaka Metro
    - 22 series – Subway Cars
    - 80 series – Linear Motor Subway Cars for Imazatosuji Line
    - 30000 series – Subway Cars for Tanimachi Line and Midosuji Line
  - Tokyo Metropolitan Bureau of Transportation
    - 5300 series – Subway Cars for the Toei Asakusa Line
  - Tokyo Metro
    - 05 series – Tokyo Metro for Tōzai Line and Chiyoda Line (Ayase Branch)
    - 17000 series – Tokyo Metro for Fukutoshin Line (8-car sets only)
  - Hiroshima Electric Railway
    - LF LRV 5100 series
  - Sendai City Transportation Bureau
    - 2000 series – Sendai Subway for Tōzai Line
  - Fukuoka Municipal Transportation Bureau
    - 2000 series – Stainless Steel Electric Train
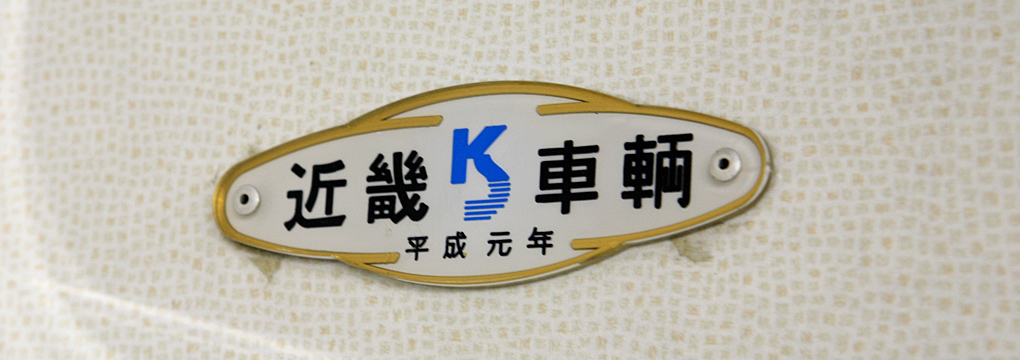
      Builder's plate of Kinki Sharyo
- Prototype(s)
  - Smart BEST hybrid Battery electric multiple unit

== See also ==
- Kinki Sharyo SLRV
