= Kintetsu 16400 series =

Japanese train type

Kintetsu 16400 series "Ace"
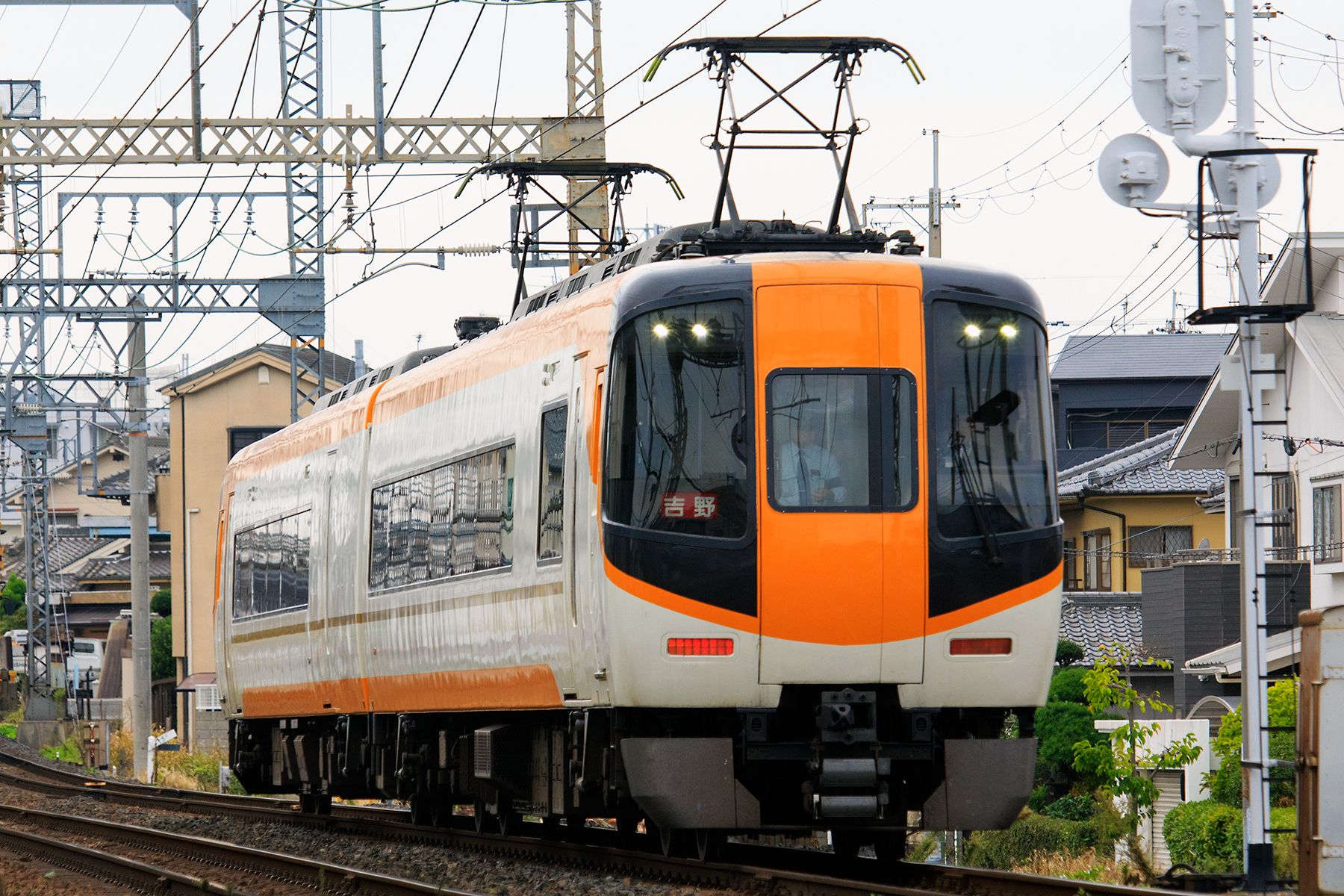
- A 16400 series set in October 2019
- In service: 1996 – Present
- Manufacturer: Kinki Sharyo
- Family name: Ace
- Replaced: 16000 series
- Constructed: 1996
- Entered service: 1 June 1996
- Refurbished: 2015
- Number built: 4 vehicles (2 sets)
- Number in service: 4 vehicles (2 sets)
- Formation: 2 cars per trainset
- Fleet numbers: YS01 – YS02
- Operators: Kintetsu Railway
- Lines served: Minami Osaka Line; Yoshino Line

Specifications
- Car body construction: Steel
- Width: 2,800 mm (9 ft 2 in)
- Doors: Two plug doors per side (trailer car); One plug door per side (motor car)
- Maximum speed: 110 km/h (70 mph)
- Traction system: Variable frequency (3-level IGBT)
- Acceleration: 2.5 km/(h⋅s) (1.6 mph/s)
- Electric system(s): 1,500 V DC, overhead line
- Current collection: Pantograph
- Bogies: Bolsterless; KD-310 (motor cars); KD-310A (trailers)
- Braking system(s): KEBS-2 electronically controlled pneumatic brakes
- Safety system(s): Kintetsu ATS
- Multiple working: 16000/16010/16600 series
- Track gauge: 1,067 mm (3 ft 6 in)

The Kintetsu 16400 series "Ace" (近鉄16400系「Ace」) is a limited express electric multiple unit (EMU) train type operated by Kintetsu Railway in Japan since 1996.

Two 2-car sets were introduced in 1996, and both are operated on the Minami Osaka and Yoshino Lines, replacing the earlier 16000 series trains. Only four cars were built as focus had shifted to the newer 16600 series sets.

The design is based on the Kintetsu 22000 series trains used on the standard gauge Osaka and Nara Lines since 1992. The 22000 series and 16400 series are practically identical, with the exception that the 16400 series are used on narrow gauge lines and that the 16400 series were built with Hitachi IGBT variable-frequency drives from new.

== Formations ==
The two two-car sets are formed as shown below.

| Designation | Tc | Mc |
| Numbering | Mo 16500 | Mo 16400 |
| Weight (t) | 38.0 | 43.0 |
| Capacity | 46+1 seat for the disabled | 52 |
| Facilities | Wheelchair-accessible toilets | Smoking compartment |

The Mo 16400 car is fitted with two lozenge-stype pantographs.

== Refurbishment ==
Both sets were refurbished in 2015. Improvements include new seat upholstery similar to those used on the refurbished 26000 series cars, new LED headlights and refurbishment of the in-car toilets. The first set to be refurbished, set 16401, returned to service on 25 March 2015. The second set, 16402, returned to service on 9 September 2015.

| Set No. | Refurbishment Year/Date |
|---|---|
| 16401 | March 2015 |
| 16402 | September 2015 |
