= Minami Osaka Line =

Railway line in Japan

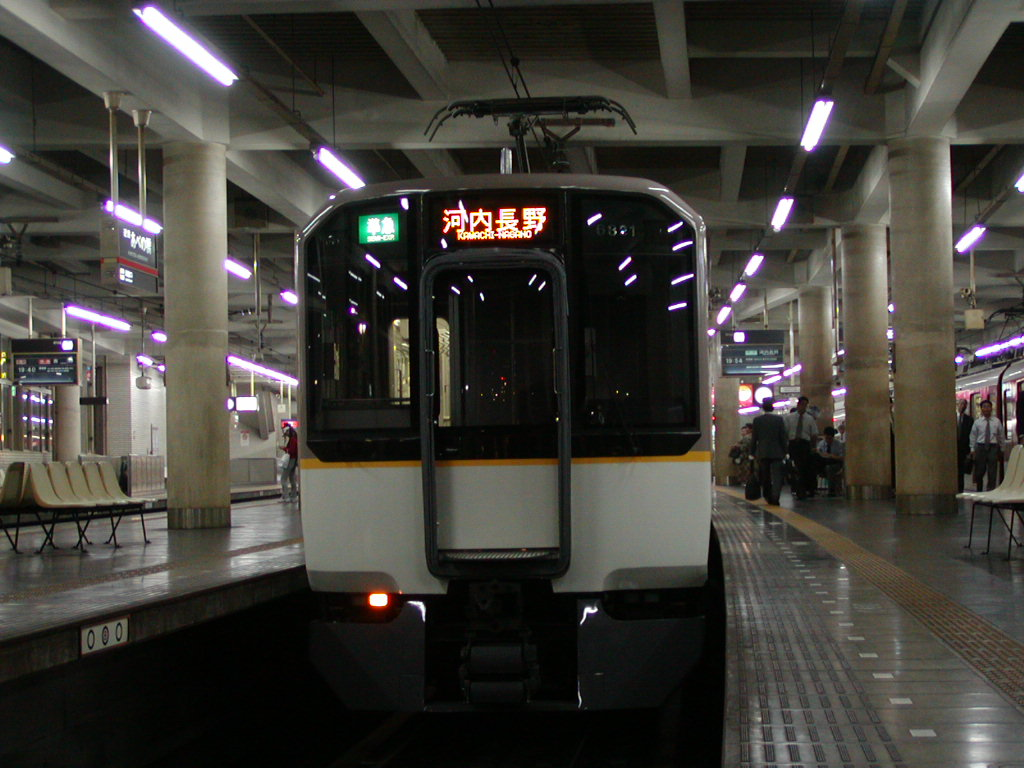
- Kintetsu 6820 series EMU at Osaka Abenobashi Station on a semi-express service for Kawachi-Nagano

Overview
- Native name: 南大阪線
- Owner: Kintetsu Railway
- Line number: F
- Locale: Osaka Prefecture; Nara Prefecture
- Termini: Osaka Abenobashi; Kashiharajingu-mae
- Stations: 28
- Color on map: (#008446)

Service
- Type: Heavy rail
- System: Kintetsu Railway
- Operator: Kintetsu Railway
- Depot(s): Furuichi; Branch: Amami
- Rolling stock: 6020 series EMU; 6200 series EMU; 6600 series EMU; 6400, 6407, 6413, 6419, 6422, 6432 series EMU; 6620 series EMU; 6820 series EMU; 16000 series EMU; 16010 series EMU; 16200 series EMU; 16400 series EMU; 16600 series EMU; 26000 series EMU

History
- Opened: 24 March 1898; 128 years ago (Domyoji–Furuichi)

Technical
- Line length: 39.7 km (24.7 mi)
- Number of tracks: Double-track
- Track gauge: 1,067 mm (3 ft 6 in)
- Electrification: 1,500 V DC (overhead lines)
- Operating speed: 110 km/h (68 mph) (limited express trains); 100 km/h (62 mph) (commuter trains)
- Signalling: Automatic closing block
- Train protection system: Kintetsu ATS, ATS-SP

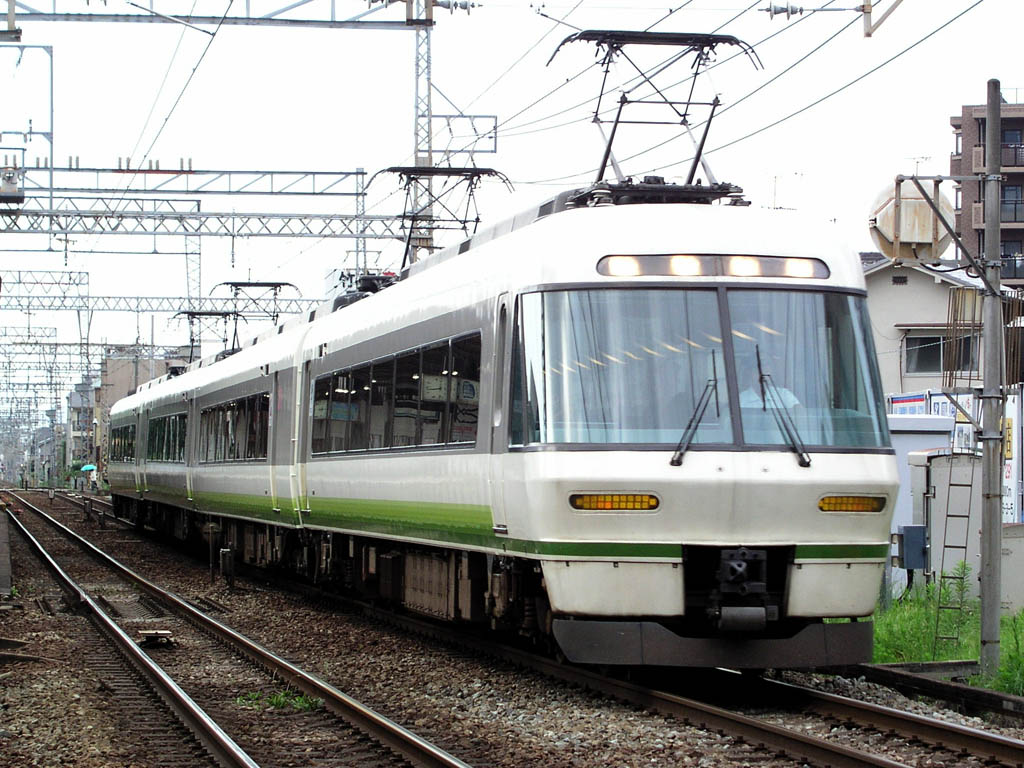
26000 series Limited Express EMU (before renovation)

The Minami Osaka Line (南大阪線, Minami-Ōsaka-sen) is a railway line operated by Kintetsu Railway. It runs between Ōsaka Abenobashi in Osaka and Kashiharajingū-mae in Kashihara, Nara Prefecture. The line connects Osaka to southern part of the Nara Basin, running through Osaka's southern suburb cities of Matsubara, Fujiidera and Habikino in Osaka Prefecture, and Katsuragi and Yamato-Takada in Nara Prefecture. Via the Yoshino Line, it also provides access to the Yoshino refuge of Emperor Godaigo, a popular tourist destination, especially during the spring.

The line and its network of branch lines use 1,067 mm (3 ft 6 in) narrow gauge tracks, the only lines in the Kintetsu network with this gauge. Other Kintetsu lines use 1,435 mm (4 ft 8 1/2 in) standard gauge.

== History ==
The first section of the line opened in 1898 between Kashiwara Station and Furuichi Station by Kayō Railway Co., Ltd. (河陽鉄道, Kayō Tetsudō). The next year Kanan Railway Co., Ltd. (河南鉄道, Kanan Railway) took over the line, before renaming itself Osaka Railway Co., Ltd. (大阪鉄道, Osaka Tetsudō). The railway then constructed its own access line to Osaka center, completed in 1923 and electrified at 1,500 V DC, then the highest voltage in Japan. An extension to Nara Prefecture to what is now Kashiharajingū-mae station was built in 1929 and through service began to the Yoshino Railway, now the Yoshino Line.

The entire route competed with the existing Osaka Line, operated by Kansai Kyūkō Electric Railway, or Kankyū. In 1943, Osaka Railway was merged with Kankyū and the Minami Osaka Line continued to operate as part of the Kankyū network. Kankyū would later rename itself in 1944 to the Kinki Nippon Railway, or Kintetsu, after merging with the Nankai Electric Railway.

== Operations ==
Some trains go through to the Nagano Line or the Yoshino Line, some operate between Furuichi and Gose Station on the Gose Line, and some from Gose run through to Osaka Abenobashi. Local trains run between Osaka Abenobashi and Fujiidera or Furuichi, and between Furuichi and Kashiharajingū-mae (including conductorless trains between Furuichi and Kashiharajingū-mae).

=== Rapid service ===
●Local train (普通 Futsu)

Running all day, but the operation is divided at Furuichi station except in the early morning and late night.

Osaka-Abenobashi-Furuichi Osaka Abenobashi - Fujiidera or Furuichi is the basic operating pattern, with four trains per hour between Osaka-Abenobashi and Fujiidera during the day, along with two additional trains between Osaka Abenobashi and Furuichi. A few trains run from Kawachi-Amami to Osaka Abenobashi in the early morning and back to Kawachi-Amami station late at night. Local trains are overtaken by Semi express trains at Imagawa, and by Limited Express or express trains at Kawachi Amami.

Furuichi-Kashiharajingu-Mae or Yoshino Normal operation is between Furuichi and Kashihara Jingu-mae. Some trains continue to Yoshino on the Yoshino Line in early morning and late nights.

In this section semi-express trains make all stops, but few trains operate here as most run on the Nagano Line after Furuichi. Local and semi-express trains to Osaka Abenobashi twice per hour alternate to provide constant daytime service. There is a direct connection from the Gose Line at Shakudo, and some trains run between Shakudo and Kashihara Jingu-mae only on weekday mornings.

●Semi-Express (準急, Junkyū) (SmE)

Semi-express trains operate between Osaka Abenobashi - Kashihara Jingu-mae or Kawachinagano. Two trains per hour run to Kashihara Jingu-mae and four to Kawachinagano. During morning rush hours, some trains operate from Gose to Osaka Abenobashi. A few trains also continue from Kashihara Jingu-mae to Yoshino as well.

●Suburban Express (区間急行, Kukan Kyūkō) (SbE)

One train on weekday mornings from Kashihara Jingu-Mae to Osaka Abenobashi and two trains on weekday evenings and one on weekend evenings in the reverse direction.

●Express (急行, Kyūkō) (Ex)

Two trains per hour from Osaka Abenobashi, through to Yoshino on the Yoshino line. Unlike other trains on this line, they are not overtaken by limited express trains at intermediate stations.

●Rapid Express (快速急行, Kaisoku Kyūkō)

Rapid express trains are operated in spring, and the stops on the Minami Osaka Line are the same as for express trains. It waits for up to 12 minutes at Kashihara Jingu-mae Station where it is overtaken by limited express trains, taking longer than normal express trains.

●Limited Express (特急, Tokkyū) (LE)

Limited express trains operate between Osaka Abenobashi and Kashihara Jingu-mae or Yoshino, one to two trains per hour on weekdays and two per hour on weekends. Some trains are operated by dedicated Sakura Liner rolling stock. To board limited express trains, a limited express ticket is needed in addition to a regular ticket.

●Limited Express Blue Symphony (特急 青のシンフォニー) (LE)

Operates twice a day except Wednesdays (a normal limited express train operates instead, but without the dedicated name or train set). Stations are the same as regular limited express trains. Limited Express. To board the Limited Express Blue Symphony, a limited express ticket and special car ticket are needed in addition to a regular ticket.

== Stations ==
- 〇: All trains stop.
- △: Some limited express trains stop at Furuichi (Osaka-bound trains until 9:34 a.m. or 9:35 a.m., and Kashihara-bound and Yoshino-bound trains departing Osaka Abenobashi after 8 p.m.).
- Local trains (普通) stop at every station.

For distances and connections, see route diagram.

| No. | Stations | Japanese | Distance (km) | SmE | SbE | Ex | LE | Transfers | Location | |
|---|---|---|---|---|---|---|---|---|---|---|
| F01 | Ōsaka Abenobashi | 大阪阿部野橋 | 0.0 | 〇 | 〇 | 〇 | 〇 | O Osaka Loop Line (Tennoji) (JR-O01); Q Yamatoji Line (V Kansai Line) (Tennoji) (JR-Q20); R Hanwa Line (Tennoji (JR-R20); Midōsuji Line (Tennoji (M23); Tanimachi Line (Tennoji) (T27); Hankai Uemachi Line (Tennoji-ekimae) (HN01) | Abeno-ku, Osaka | Osaka Prefecture |
| F02 | Koboreguchi | 河堀口 | 1.0 | | | | | | Abeno-ku, Osaka | Osaka Prefecture |
| F03 | Kita-Tanabe | 北田辺 | 2.1 | | | | | | Higashisumiyoshi-ku, Osaka | Osaka Prefecture |
| F04 | Imagawa | 今川 | 2.7 | | | | | | Higashisumiyoshi-ku, Osaka | Osaka Prefecture |
| F05 | Harinakano | 針中野 | 3.8 | | | | | | Higashisumiyoshi-ku, Osaka | Osaka Prefecture |
| F06 | Yata | 矢田 | 5.1 | | | | | | Higashisumiyoshi-ku, Osaka | Osaka Prefecture |
| F07 | Kawachi-Amami (Hannan University) | 河内天美 (阪南大学前) | 7.3 | | | | | | Matsubara | Osaka Prefecture |
| F08 | Nunose | 布忍 | 8.3 | | | | | | Matsubara | Osaka Prefecture |
| F09 | Takaminosato | 高見ノ里 | 9.1 | | | | | | Matsubara | Osaka Prefecture |
| F10 | Kawachi-Matsubara | 河内松原 | 10.0 | 〇 | | | | | Matsubara | Osaka Prefecture |
| F11 | Eganoshō | 恵我ノ荘 | 11.6 | | | | | | Habikino | Osaka Prefecture |
| F12 | Takawashi | 高鷲 | 12.6 | | | | | | Habikino | Osaka Prefecture |
| F13 | Fujiidera | 藤井寺 | 13.7 | 〇 | | | | | Fujiidera | Osaka Prefecture |
| F14 | Hajinosato | 土師ノ里 | 15.6 | 〇 | | | | | Fujiidera | Osaka Prefecture |
| F15 | Dōmyōji | 道明寺 | 16.3 | 〇 | | | | N Domyoji Line (N15) | Fujiidera | Osaka Prefecture |
| F16 | Furuichi | 古市 | 18.3 | 〇 | 〇 | 〇 | △ | O Nagano Line (O16) | Habikino | Osaka Prefecture |
| F17 | Komagatani | 駒ヶ谷 | 20.0 | 〇 | | | | | Habikino | Osaka Prefecture |
| F18 | Kaminotaishi | 上ノ太子 | 22.0 | 〇 | | | | | Habikino | Osaka Prefecture |
| F19 | Nijōzan | 二上山 | 27.3 | 〇 | | | | | Kashiba | Nara Prefecture |
| F20 | Nijō-jinjaguchi | 二上神社口 | 28.4 | 〇 | | | | | Katsuragi | Nara Prefecture |
| F21 | Taimadera | 当麻寺 | 30.4 | 〇 | | | | | Katsuragi | Nara Prefecture |
| F22 | Iwaki | 磐城 | 31.1 | 〇 | | | | | Katsuragi | Nara Prefecture |
| F23 | Shakudo | 尺土 | 32.3 | 〇 | 〇 | 〇 | 〇 | P Gose Line (P23) | Katsuragi | Nara Prefecture |
| F24 | Takadashi | 高田市 | 34.2 | 〇 | 〇 | 〇 | 〇 | | Yamatotakada | Nara Prefecture |
| F25 | Ukiana | 浮孔 | 35.6 | 〇 | 〇 | | | | Yamatotakada | Nara Prefecture |
| F26 | Bōjō | 坊城 | 36.8 | 〇 | 〇 | | | | Kashihara | Nara Prefecture |
| F27 | Kashiharajingū-nishiguchi | 橿原神宮西口 | 38.5 | 〇 | 〇 | | | | Kashihara | Nara Prefecture |
| F42 | Kashiharajingū-mae | 橿原神宮前 | 39.7 | 〇 | 〇 | 〇 | 〇 | F Yoshino Line (through service); B Kashihara Line (B42) | Kashihara | Nara Prefecture |
| Through section | | from Furuichi to Kawachinagano on the O Nagano Line (local trains, semi-express trains, express trains) from Shakudo to Kintetsu Gose on the P Gose Line (local trains, semi-express trains) from Kashiharajingū-mae to Yoshino on the F Yoshino Line (local trains, semi-express trains, express trains, limited express trains) | | | | | | | | |
