= Kita-Tanabe Station =

Railway station in Osaka, Japan

Kita-Tanabe Station 北田辺駅
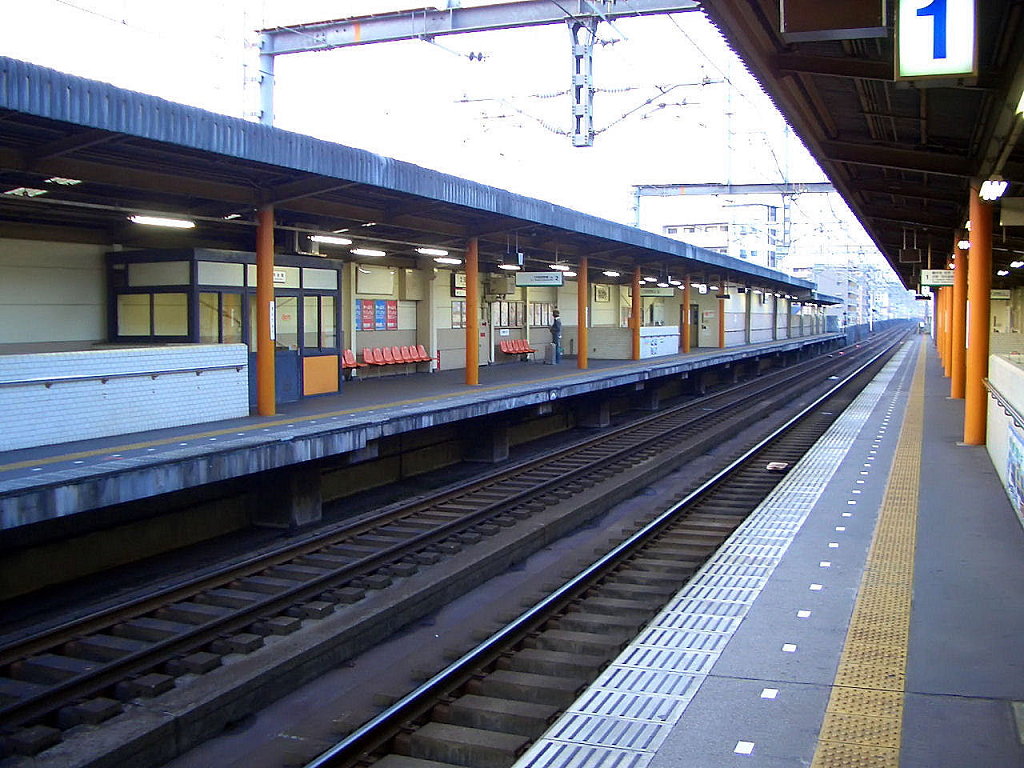
- Platforms and tracks

General information
- Location: 16-29, Kitatanabe 4-chōme, Higashisumiyoshi-ku, Osaka, Osaka 546-0044 （大阪市東住吉区北田辺四丁目16-29） Japan
- Coordinates: 34°37′57″N 135°31′44″E
- Owner: Kintetsu Railway
- Operator: Kintetsu Railway
- Line: Minami Osaka Line
- Distance: 2.1 km (1.3 mi) from Ōsaka Abenobashi
- Platforms: 2
- Tracks: 2
- Connections: Bus stop

Other information
- Station code: F03

History
- Opened: 1923; 103 years ago

Passengers
- 2016: 10,092 daily
Location

Kita-Tanabe Station (北田辺駅, Kita-Tanabe-eki) is a railway station in Higashisumiyoshi-ku, Osaka, Osaka Prefecture, Japan, on the Kintetsu Minami Osaka Line.

== Lines ==
Kita-Tanabe Station is served by the Minami Osaka Line and is 2.1 kilometres (1.3 mi) from the starting point of the line Ōsaka Abenobashi.

== Layout ==
Kita-Tanabe Station has two side platforms on the third level serving a track each.

=== Platforms ===
1	■ Minami-Osaka Line	for Fujiidera, Furuichi, Kashiharajingu-mae, Yoshino, and Kawachinagano
2	■ Minami-Osaka Line	for Osaka Abenobashi

== Adjacent stations ==
«	Service	»
Kintetsu
Minami Osaka Line
Koboreguchi	Local	Imagawa
Semi-Express: Does not stop at this station
Suburban Express: Does not stop at this station
Express: Does not stop at this station
Limited Express: Does not stop at this station
