= YATA =

YATA may refer to:

- Yata Station, a train station in Japan
- Youth Atlantic Treaty Association
- Yata Supermarket, a Japanese-style supermarket chain in Hong Kong, subsidiary of Sun Hung Kai Properties

== Mythology ==
- Yata no Kagami, a sacred mirror
- Yata (Lakota mythology), the personification of the east wind in Lakota mythology

== People ==
- Yata Kouji (1933–2014), Japanese voice actor
