= Koboreguchi Station =

Railway station in Osaka, Japan

Koboreguchi Station 河堀口駅
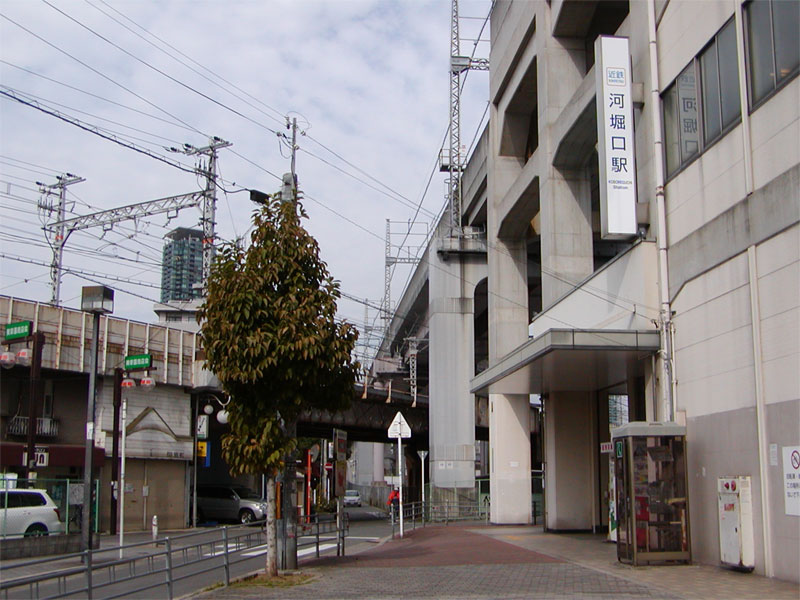

General information
- Location: 24-1, Tennōji-cho Minami 2-chōme, Abeno-ku, Osaka, Osaka （大阪市阿倍野区天王寺町南二丁目24-1） Japan
- Coordinates: 34°38′29″N 135°31′26″E
- Operator: Kintetsu Railway
- Line: Minami Osaka Line

Other information
- Station code: F02

History
- Opened: 1923; 103 years ago

Passengers
- 2016: 6,384 daily
Location

Koboreguchi Station (河堀口駅, Koboreguchi-eki) is a railway station in Abeno-ku, Osaka, Osaka Prefecture, Japan, on the Kintetsu Minami Osaka Line.

Average ticket at this station cost ¥150 (yen) and it is close to Bishoen Station on the JR Hanwa Line.

== Layout ==
Koboreguchi Station has two side platforms on the 4th level serving a track each.

=== Platforms ===
1	■ Minami-Osaka Line	for Fujiidera, Furuichi, Kashiharajingu-mae, Yoshino, and Kawachinagano
2	■ Minami-Osaka Line	to Osaka Abenobashi

== Surrounding ==
- Bishōen Station (JR Hanwa Line)

== Adjacent stations ==
«	Service	»
Kintetsu
Minami-Osaka Line
Ōsaka Abenobashi (F01)	Local	Kita-Tanabe (F03)
Semi-Express: Does not stop at this station
Suburban Express: Does not stop at this station
Express: Does not stop at this station
Limited Express: Does not stop at this station
