= Kawachi-Amami Station =

Railway station in Matsubara, Osaka Prefecture, Japan

Kawachi-Amami Station 河内天美駅
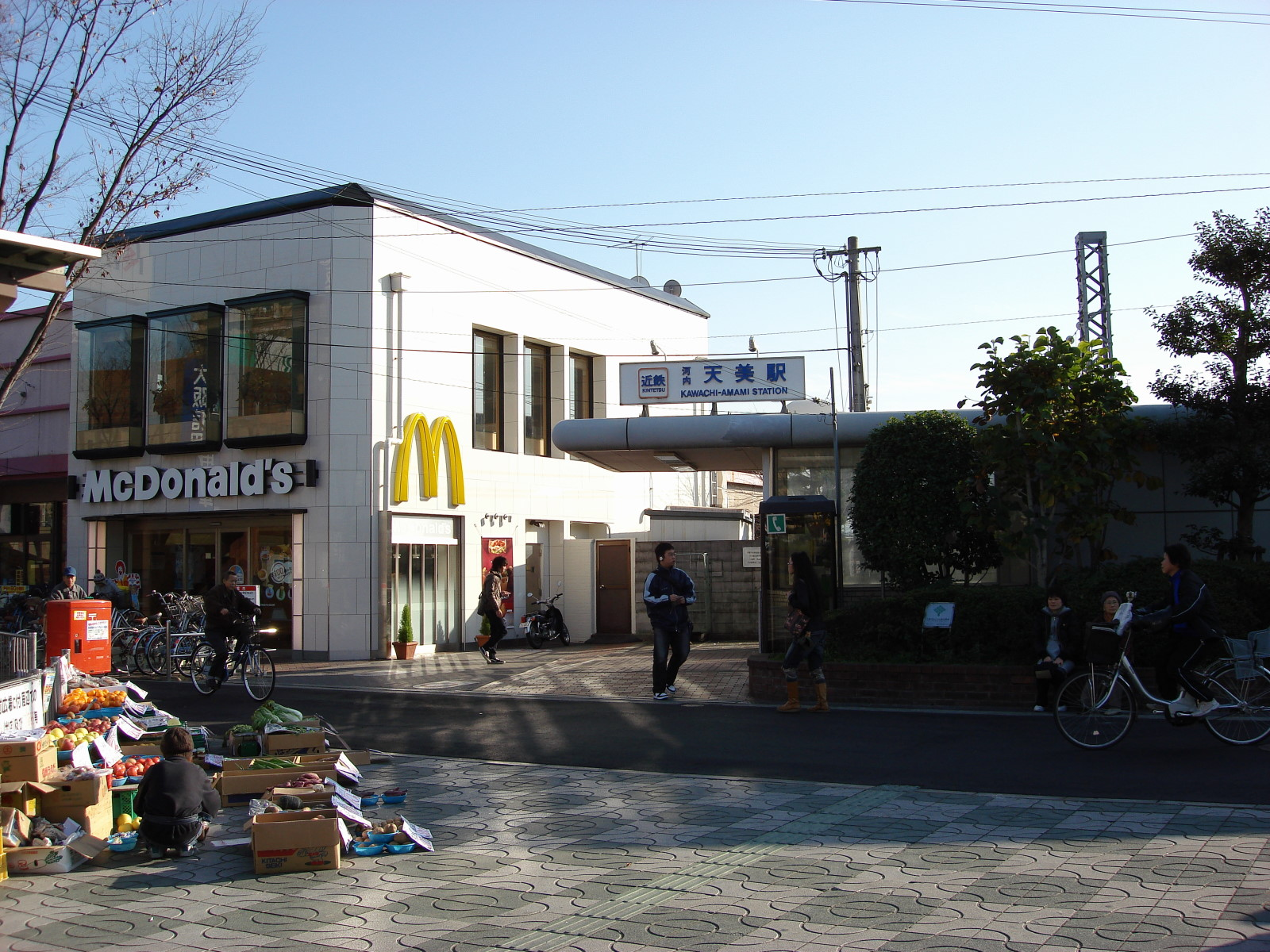
- Kawachi-Amami Station, December 2006

General information
- Location: 15-41, Amami-minami 3-chōme, Matsubara-shi, Osaka-fu 580-0033; Japan
- Coordinates: 34°35′12″N 135°32′06″E
- Operator: Kintetsu Railway
- Line: Minami Osaka Line
- Distance: 7.3 km (4.5 mi) from Ōsaka Abenobashi
- Platforms: 2 side platforms
- Connections

Other information
- Station code: F07
- Website: Official website

History
- Opened: April 13, 1923; 103 years ago
- Former names: Amami-shakomae (until 1933)

Passengers
- FY2018: 16,958 daily
Location
- Location within Osaka Prefecture Location within Japan

Kawachi-Amami Station (河内天美駅, Kawachi-Amami-eki) is a passenger railway station in located in the city of Matsubara, Osaka Prefecture, Japan, operated by the private railway operator Kintetsu Railway.

== Lines ==
Kawachi-Amami Station is served by the Minami Osaka Line, and is located 7.3 rail kilometers from the starting point of the line at Ōsaka Abenobashi Station.

== Station layout ==
The station consists of two ground-level side platforms connected by an underground passage. Platforms 2 and 3 do not exist, and the tracks are used for through traffic.

=== Platforms ===
1	■ Minami-Osaka Line	for Fujiidera, Furuichi, Kashiharajingū-mae, Yoshino and Kawachi-Nagano
4	■ Minami-Osaka Line	for Osaka Abenobashi

== Adjacent stations ==
«	Service	»
Minami Osaka Line
Yata	Local	Nunose
Semi-Express: Does not stop at this station
Suburban Express: Does not stop at this station
Express: Does not stop at this station
Limited Express: Does not stop at this station

== History ==
Kawachi-Amami Station opened on April 13, 1923 as the Amami-Shakomae Station (天美車庫前駅). It was renamed to its present name on April 1, 1933.

== Passenger statistics ==
In fiscal 2018, the station was used by an average of 16,958 passengers daily.

== Surrounding area ==
- Hannan University
- Matsubara City Matsubara Daini Junior High School
- Matsubara City Amami Elementary School
- Matsubara City Amamiminami Elementary School

== See also ==
- List of railway stations in Japan
