= Harinakano Station =

Railway station in Osaka, Japan

Harinakano Station 針中野駅
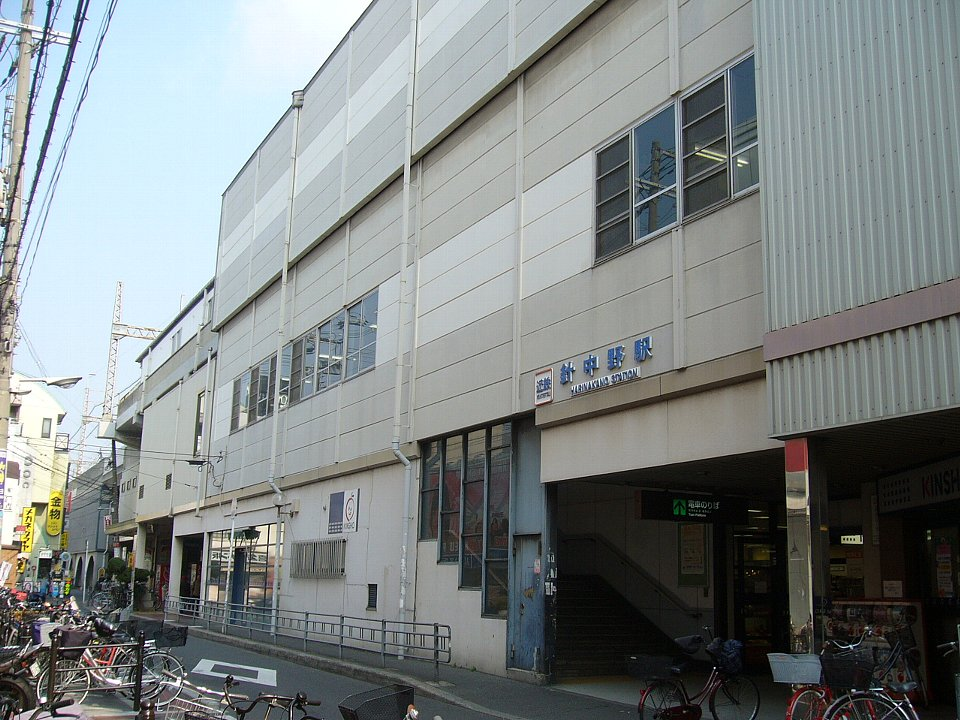
- Harinakano Station in February 2007

General information
- Location: 24-8, Komagawa 5-chōme, Higashisumiyoshi, Osaka, Osaka 546-0043 （大阪市東住吉区駒川五丁目24-8） Japan
- Coordinates: 34°37′1.6″N 135°31′58.7″E
- Operator: Kintetsu Railway
- Line: Minami Osaka Line
- Distance: 3.8 km (2.4 mi) from Ōsaka Abenobashi
- Platforms: 2 slide platforms
- Connections

Other information
- Station code: F05

History
- Opened: 1923; 103 years ago

Passengers
- November 9, 2010: 19,594 daily
Location

Harinakano Station(針中野駅, -eki) is a railway station on the Kintetsu Minami Osaka Line in Komagawa Gochome, Higashisumiyoshi-ku, Osaka, Japan.

The station was renovated between 2022 and 2024.

== Layout ==
The station has 2 elevated side platforms serving a track each (3rd level).

1	■ Minami-Osaka Line	for Fujiidera , Furuichi , Kashiharajingu-mae , Yoshino and Kawachi-Nagano
2	■ Minami-Osaka Line	for Osaka Abenobashi

== Surroundings ==
- Komagawa Shopping Arcade (駒川商店街)
  - Gyoza no Ohsho
- Mister Donut
- McDonald's
- CoCo Ichimanya
- Tsutaya
- Joshin
- Supermarket KINSHO
- Komagawa-Nakano Station - Osaka Metro Tanimachi Line
- Osaka Municipal Higashisumiyoshi Library
- Osaka Municipal Nakano Junior High School
- Osaka Municipal Minami-Kudara Elementary School
- Osaka Municipal Higashi-Tanabe Elementary School
- Osaka Municipal Takaai Elementary School

== Stations next to Harinakano ==
«	Service	»
Minami-Osaka Line
Imagawa	Local	Yata
Semi-Express: Does not stop at this station
Suburban Express: Does not stop at this station
Express: Does not stop at this station
Limited Express: Does not stop at this station
