= Imagawa Station (Osaka) =

Railway station in Osaka, Japan

Imagawa Station 今川駅
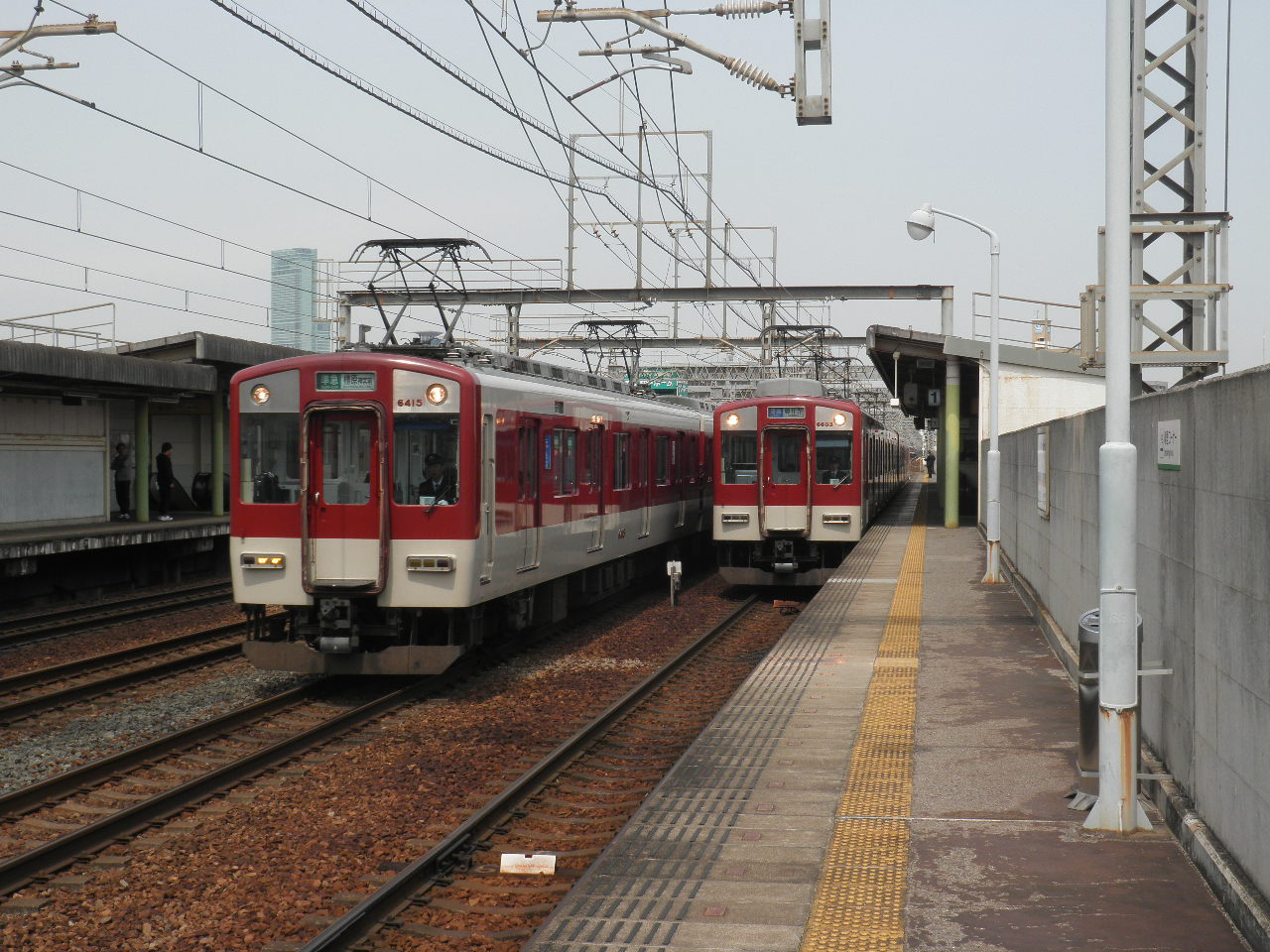
- Kintetsu Imagawa Station in 2014

General information
- Location: 4-55, Komagawa 3-chōme, Higashisumiyoshi-ku, Osaka, Osaka 546-0043 （大阪市東住吉区駒川三丁目4-55） Japan
- Coordinates: 34°37′34″N 135°31′52″E
- System: Kintetsu Railway commuter rail station
- Owner: Kintetsu Railway
- Operator: Kintetsu Railway
- Line: Minami Osaka Line
- Distance: 2.7 km (1.7 mi) from Ōsaka Abenobashi
- Platforms: 2
- Tracks: 4

Other information
- Station code: F04

History
- Opened: 1931; 95 years ago
- Former names: Komagawa (until 1933)

Passengers
- 2016: 8,782 daily
Location

Imagawa Station (今川駅, Imagawa-eki) is a railway station on the Kintetsu Minami Osaka Line in Higashisumiyoshi-ku, Osaka, Osaka Prefecture, Japan.

== Lines ==
Imagawa station is served by the Minami-Osaka Line and is 2.7 kilometres (1.7 miles) from the starting point of the line Ōsaka Abenobashi.

== Layout ==
- There are 2 side platforms with 4 tracks elevated. Numbers 2 and 3 are used for passing trains.

1	■ Minami-Osaka Line	for Fujiidera, Furuichi, Kashiharajingū-mae, Yoshino and Kawachi-Nagano
4	■ Minami-Osaka Line	for Osaka Abenobashi

== Adjacent stations ==
«	Service	»
Minami Osaka Line
Kita-Tanabe	Local	Harinakano
Semi-Express: Does not stop at this station
Suburban Express: Does not stop at this station
Express: Does not stop at this station
Limited Express: Does not stop at this station
