= 1400 series =

1400 series may refer to:

- Kintetsu 1400 series electric multiple unit operating for Kintetsu Railway
- IBM 1400 series computers produced by IBM
- MBTA Orange Line 1400 series subway cars made by CRRC and used by the MBTA
