= Ukiana Station =

Railway station in Yamatotakada, Nara Prefecture, Japan

Ukiana Station 浮孔駅
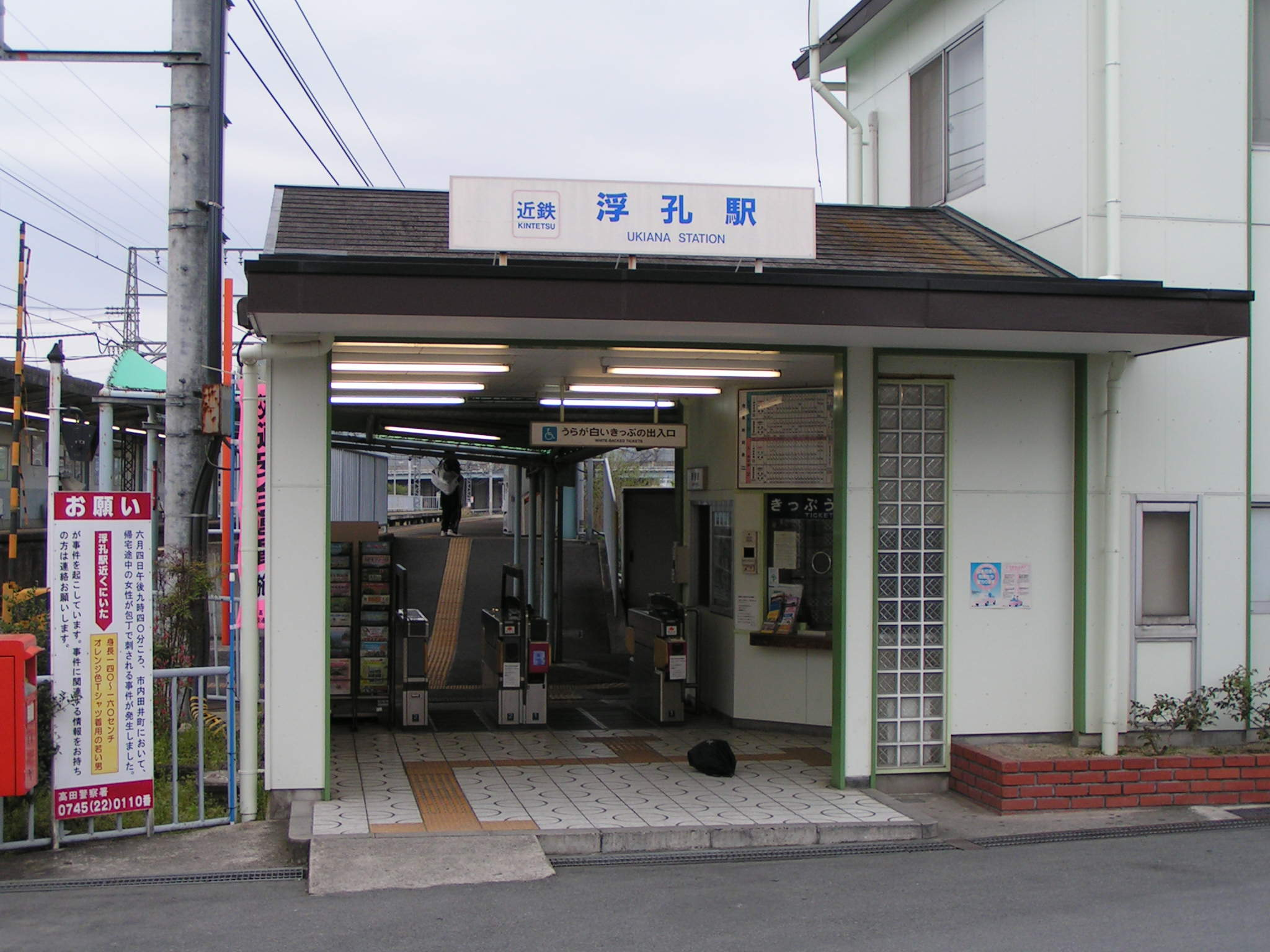
- Station building

General information
- Location: 376-2 Tai, Yamatotakada-shi, Nara-ken 635-0041; Japan
- Coordinates: 34°29′54″N 135°45′15″E
- Operator: Kintetsu Railway
- Line: F Minami Osaka Line
- Distance: 35.6 km from Ōsaka Abenobashi
- Platforms: 2 side platforms
- Tracks: 2

Other information
- Status: Unattended
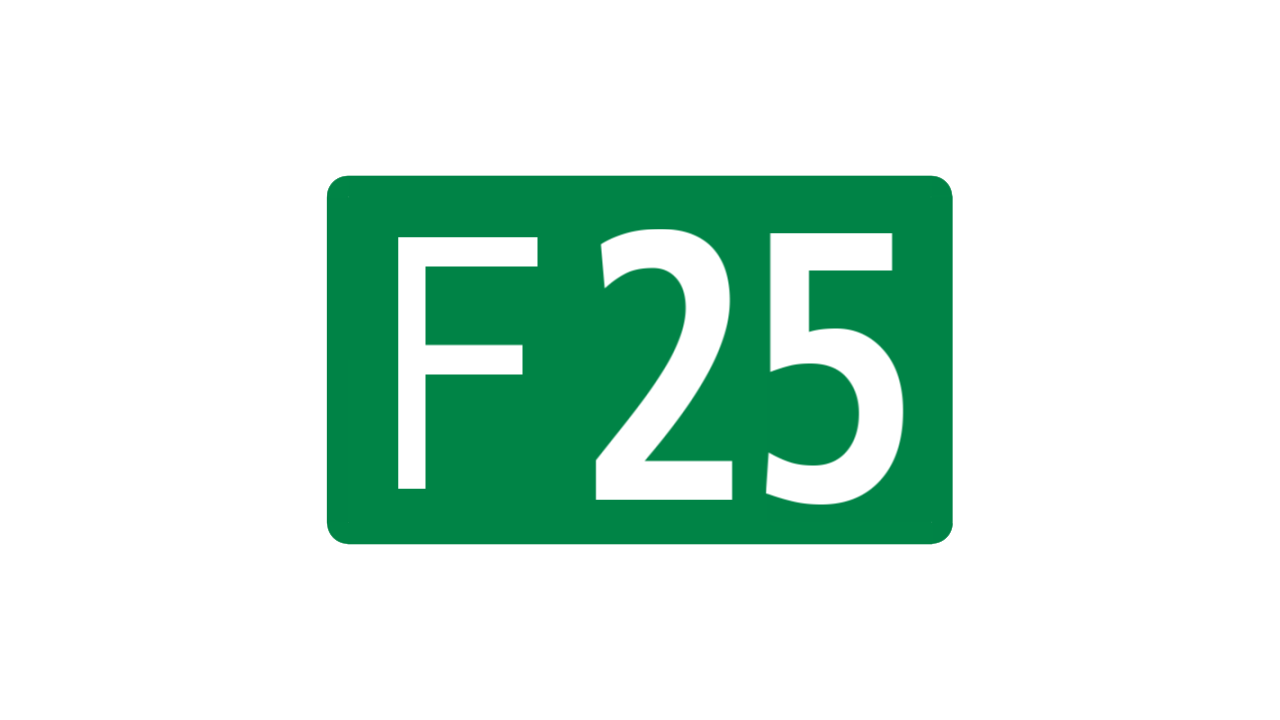
- Station code
- Website: Official website

History
- Opened: 29 March 1929

Passengers
- FY2019: 789 daily

Services
Preceding station	Kintetsu Railway	Following station
Takadashi towards Ōsaka Abenobashi	Minami Osaka Line Local Semi-Express	Bōjō towards Kashiharajingū-mae
Location
- Location within Nara Prefecture Location within Japan

Ukiana Station (浮孔駅, Ukiana-eki) is a passenger railway station located in the city of Yamatotakada, Nara Prefecture, Japan. It is operated by the private transportation company, Kintetsu Railway.

== Line ==
Ukiana Station is served by the Minami Osaka Line and is 35.6 kilometers from the starting point of the line at Ōsaka Abenobashi.

== Layout ==
The station has two opposed side platforms on the ground, connected by a level crossing. The effective length of the platform is six cars. The station is unattended.

=== Platforms ===
1	■ Minami-Osaka Line	for Kashiharajingū-mae and Yoshino
2	■ Minami-Osaka Line	for Furuichi and Ōsaka Abenobashi

== History ==
Ukiana Station opened on 29 March 1929 when Osaka Railway extended its line from Furuichi to Kumedera (now Kashiharajingu-mae). On 1 February 1943, the line merged with the Kansai Express Railway and became the Kansai Express Railway's Tennoji Line. This line was merged with the Nankai Electric Railway on 1 June 1944 to form Kintetsu.

== Passenger statistics ==
In fiscal 2019, the station was used by an average of 789 passengers daily (boarding passengers only).

== Surrounding area ==
- Japan National Route 165 (Yamatotakada Bypass)
- Japan National Route 24 (Kashihara Bypass)

== See also ==
- List of railway stations in Japan
