= Higashisumiyoshi-ku =

Ward of Osaka, Japan

Coordinates: 34°37′19.63″N 135°31′35.81″E

Location of Higashisumiyoshi-ku in Osaka City

Higashisumiyoshi-ku (東住吉区) is one of 24 wards of Osaka, Japan.

== Points of interest ==
- Nagai Park
  - Nagai Botanical Garden
  - Nagai Stadium
  - Yanmar Field Nagai
  - Yodoko Sakura Stadium

== Shopping ==
- Komagawa Shopping Arcade (駒川商店街)

== Headquarters ==
- Sangaria

== Train stations ==
JR West

- Kansai Main Line (Yamatoji Line): Tobu-shijo-mae Station
- Higashisumiyoshi-ku is also close to stations on the Hanwa Line, Bishōen, Minami-Tanabe and Tsurugaoka in Abeno-ku.

Kintetsu Railway

- Minami Osaka Line: Kita-Tanabe Station - Imagawa Station - Harinakano Station - Yata Station

Osaka Metro

- Tanimachi Line: Tanabe Station - Komagawa-Nakano Station
