= Bōjō Station =

Railway station in Kashihara, Nara Prefecture, Japan

Bōjō Station 坊城駅
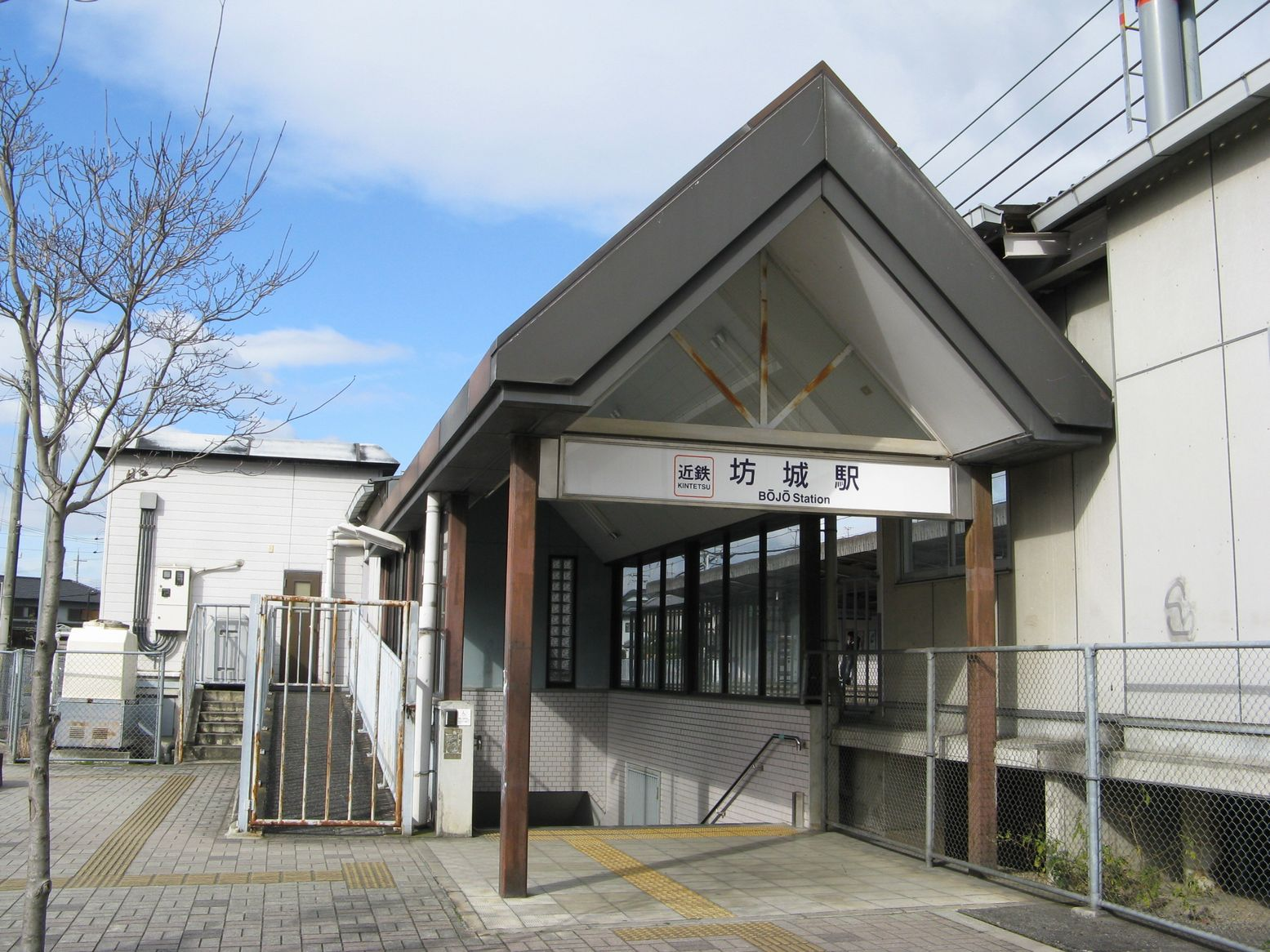
- Bōjō Station south exit

General information
- Location: 281-2, Higashibōjō-chō, Kashihara-shi, Nara-ken 634-0835; Japan
- Coordinates: 34°29′36″N 135°45′56″E
- System: Kintetsu Railway commuter rail station
- Owner: Kintetsu Railway
- Operator: Kintetsu Railway
- Line: P Minami Osaka Line
- Distance: 36.8 km (22.9 miles) from Osaka Abenobashi
- Platforms: 2 side platforms
- Tracks: 2
- Train operators: Kintetsu Railway
- Connections: Bus terminal

Construction
- Cycle facilities: Available
- Accessible: Yes

Other information
- Station code: F26
- Website: www.kintetsu.co.jp/station/station_info/station07030.html

History
- Opened: 29 March 1929

Passengers
- FY2019: 1719 daily

Services
Preceding station	Kintetsu Railway	Following station
Ukiana towards Ōsaka Abenobashi	Minami Osaka Line Local Semi-Express	Kashiharajingū-mae Terminus
Location

Bōjō Station (坊城駅, Bōjō-eki) is a passenger railway station located in the city of Kashihara, Nara Prefecture, Japan. It is operated by the private transportation company, Kintetsu Railway.

== Line ==
Bōjō Station is served by the Minami Osaka Line and is 36.8 kilometers from the starting point of the line at Osaka Abenobashi.

== Layout ==
The station has two opposing side platforms with two tracks, with the ticket gates and concourse underground and the platforms above ground. As limited express trains stop here, the effective platform length is for six cars. The station is staffed.

== Platforms ==
1	■ F Minami Osaka Line	for Kashiharajingū-mae
2	■ F Minami Osaka Line	for Osaka Abenobashi

== History ==
Bōjō Station was opened 29 March 1929 on the Osaka Railway. It became a Kansai Express Railway station due to a company merger on 1 February 1943, and through a subsequent mergers became a station on the Kintetsu Railway on 1 June 1944.

== Passenger statistics ==
In fiscal 2019 the station was used by an average of 1710 passengers daily (boarding passengers only).

== Surrounding area ==
- Kashihara City Kanabashi Elementary School

== See also ==
- List of railway stations in Japan
