= Yata Station =

Railway station in Osaka, Japan

Yata Station 矢田駅
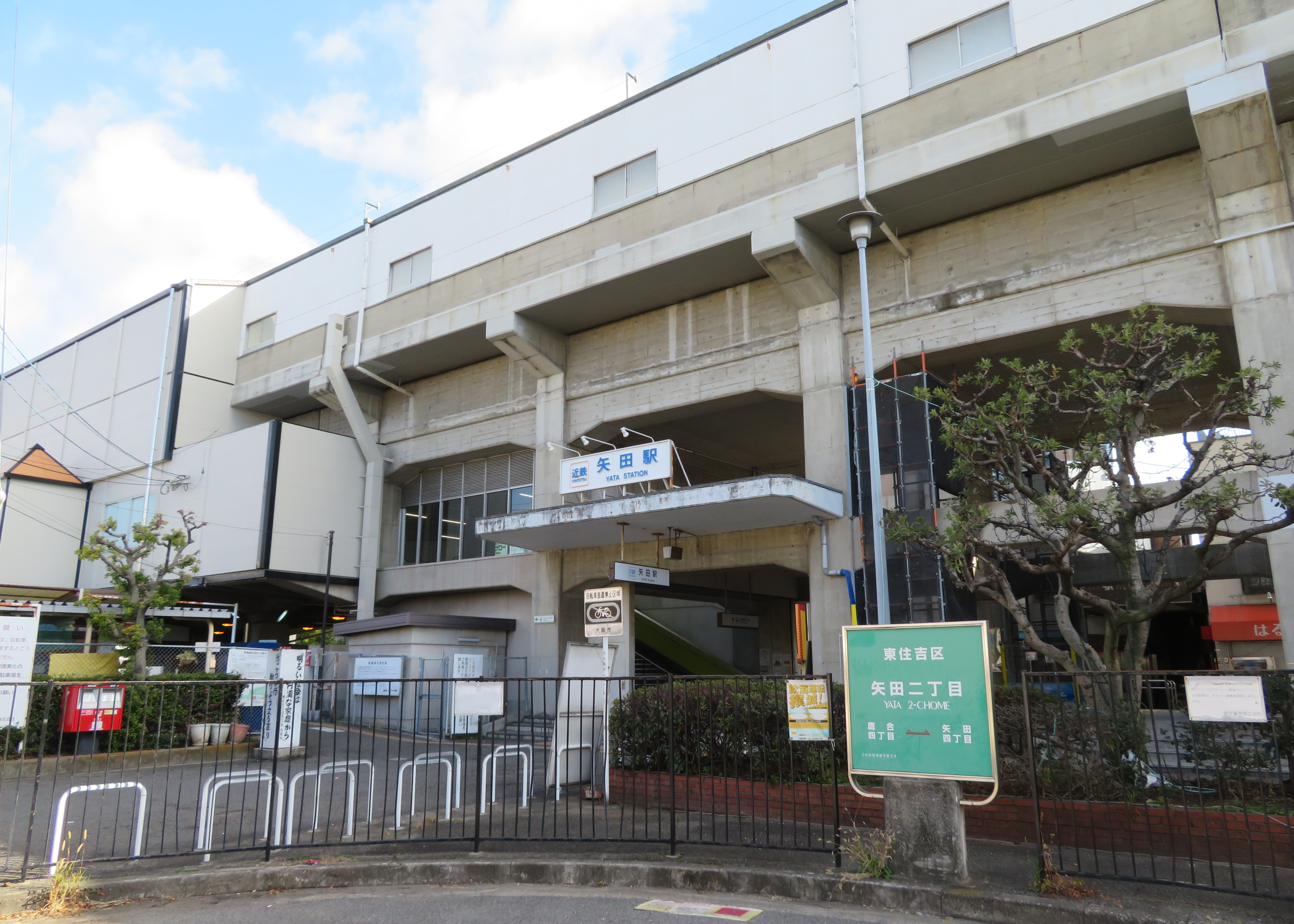

General information
- Location: 25-27, Yata 2-chōme, Higashisumiyoshi, Osaka; Osaka 546-0023 （大阪市東住吉区矢田二丁目25-27） Japan
- Coordinates: 34°36′22″N 135°31′58″E
- Operator: Kintetsu Railway
- Line: Minami Osaka Line
- Distance: 5.1 km (3.2 mi) from Ōsaka Abenobashi
- Platforms: 2 side platforms
- Connections: Bus stop

Other information
- Station code: F06

History
- Opened: 1923; 103 years ago

Passengers
- 2016: 18,692 daily
Location

Yata Station (矢田駅, Yata-eki) is a railway station on Kintetsu Minami Osaka Line in Higashisumiyoshi-ku, Osaka-shi, Ōsaka-fu, Japan.

== Layout ==
Yata Station has two side platforms with two tracks elevated.

=== Platforms ===
1	■ Minami-Osaka Line	for Fujiidera, Furuichi, Kashiharajingū-mae, Yoshino, Kawachi-Nagano
2	■ Minami-Osaka Line	for Ōsaka Abenobashi

== Adjacent stations ==
«	Service	»
Minami Osaka Line
Harinakano	Local	Kawachi-Amami
Semi-Express: Does not stop at this station
Suburban Express: Does not stop at this station
Express: Does not stop at this station
Limited Express: Does not stop at this station
