= Kintetsu 1400 series =

Japanese train type

Kintetsu 1400/1200/1201/2050/6600 series
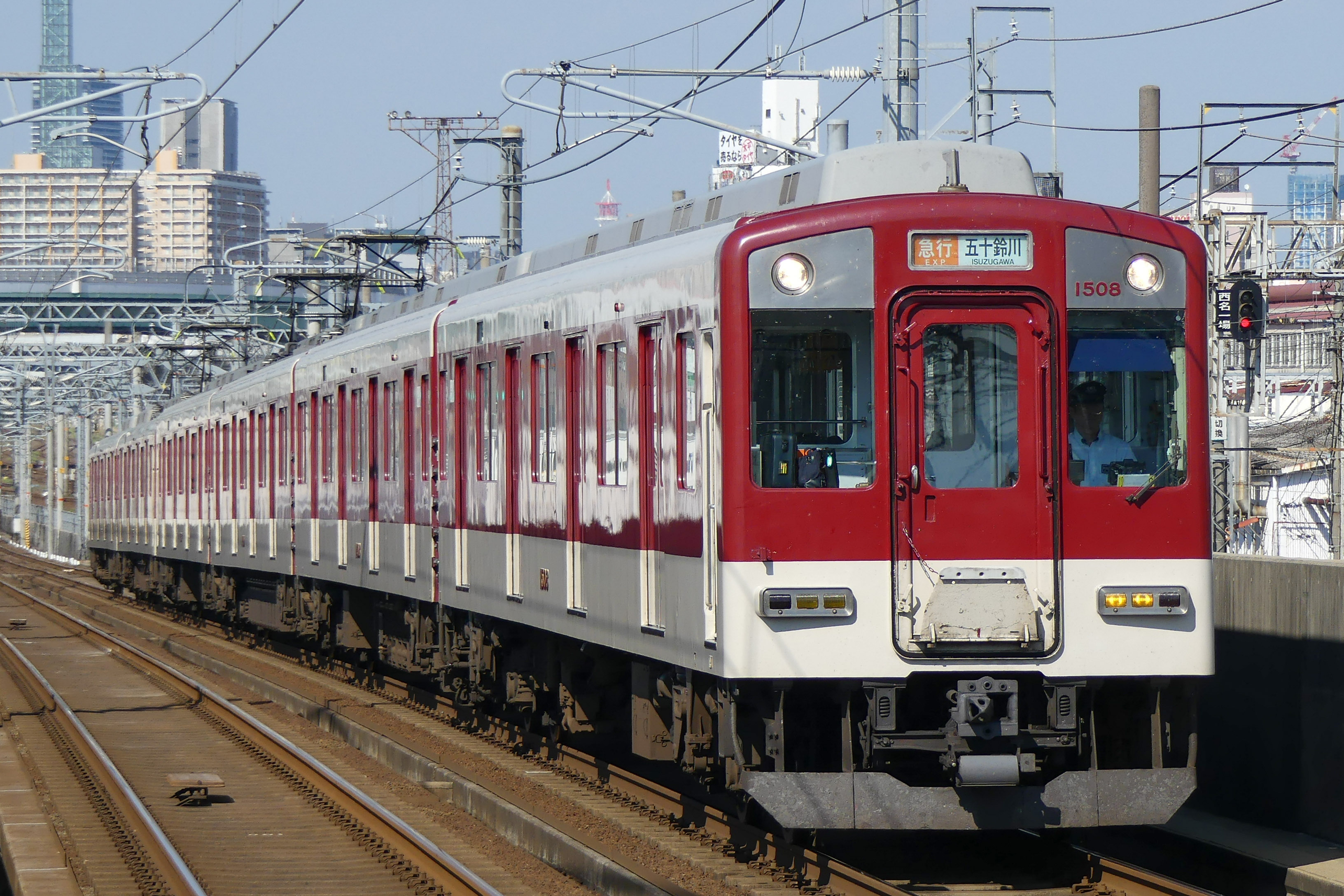
- 1400 series set 1407 in July 2018
- In service: 1981–present
- Manufacturer: Kinki Sharyo
- Formation: 2 cars per 1201/6600 series set; 3 cars per 2050 series set; 4 cars per 1200/1400 series set
- Operators: Kintetsu Railway

Specifications
- Car length: 20,720 mm (68 ft 0 in)
- Width: 2,740 mm (9 ft 0 in)
- Height: 4,150 mm (13 ft 7 in) (motor car); 4,055 mm (13 ft 4 in) (trailer car)
- Doors: 4 pairs per side
- Acceleration: 3.3 km/(h⋅s) (2.1 mph/s)
- Deceleration: 3.5 km/(h⋅s) (2.2 mph/s) (service); 4.5 km/(h⋅s) (2.8 mph/s) (emergency)
- Electric system(s): 1,500 V DC (overhead catenary)
- Current collector(s): Pantograph

The Kintetsu 1400 series (近鉄1400系, Kintetsu 1400-kei) is a commuter electric multiple unit (EMU) train type operated by the private railway operator Kintetsu Railway since 1981 on many of its commuter lines in the Kansai area of Japan.

== Design ==
First introduced in 1981, the design is based on the earlier Kintetsu 3000 series commuter train, also manufactured by Kinki Sharyo.

All trains are equipped with longitudinal seating and automatic announcements in both Japanese and English. All trainsets run on standard gauge 1,435 mm (4 ft 8 1/2 in), except for the 6600 series which run on 1,067 mm (3 ft 6 in) gauge on the Minami Osaka Line.

== Variants ==
- 1200 series: 4-car sets primarily used on the Nagoya Line
- 1201 series: 2-car sets primarily used on the Nagoya Line equipped for wanman driver-only operation
- 1400 series: 4-car sets primarily used on the Nagoya Line
- 2050 series: 3-car sets primarily used on the Nagoya Line
- 6600 series: 2-car narrow-gauge sets primarily used on the Minami Osaka Line network

== 1200 series ==
1200 series
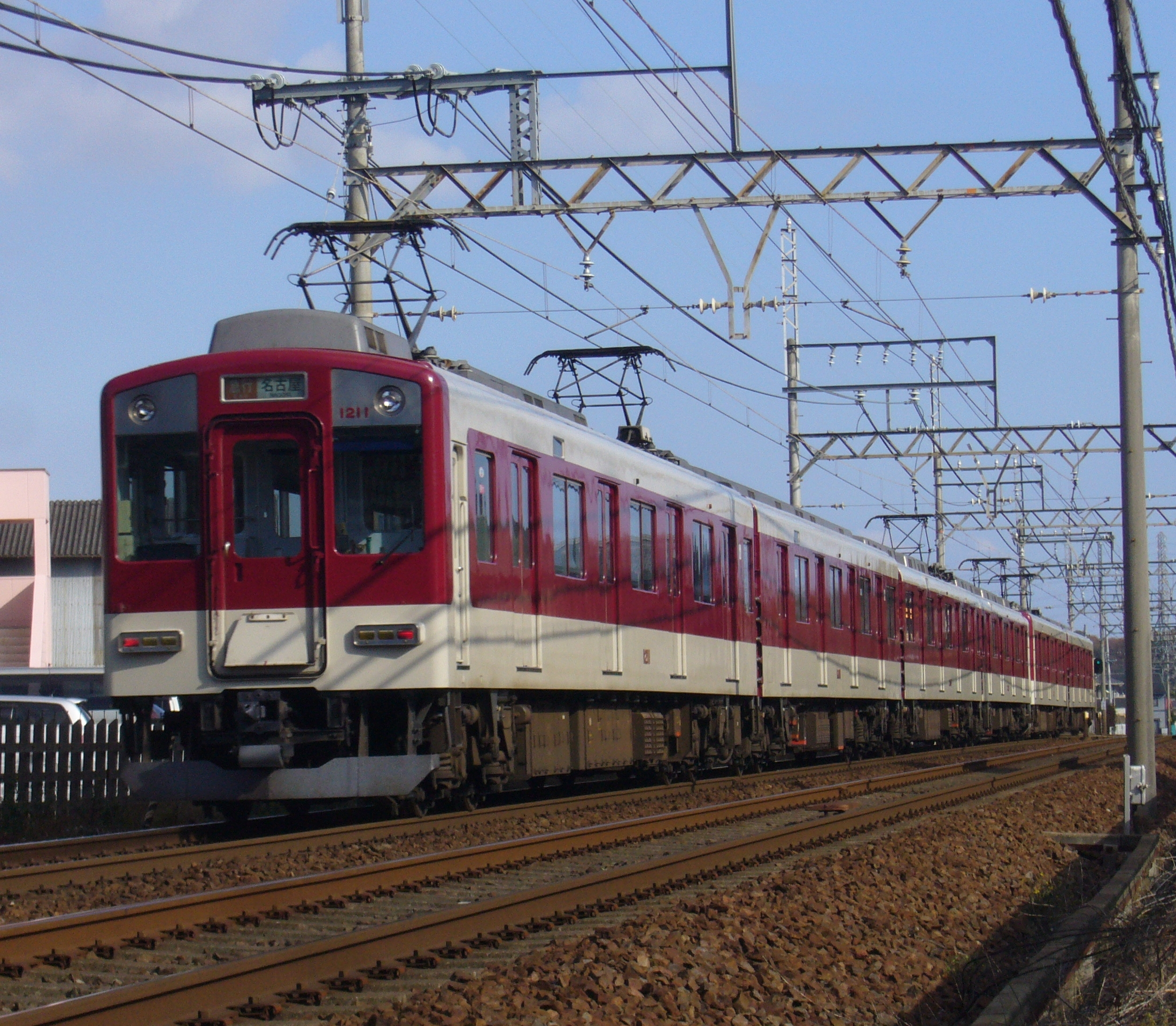
- Set 1211 on the Nagoya Line
- In service: 1984–present
- Manufacturer: Kinki Sharyo
- Constructed: 1984
- Refurbished: 2003–2004
- Number built: 11 sets (24 vehicles)
- Number in service: 2 sets (8 vehicles)
- Formation: 4 cars per trainset
- Fleet numbers: FC92–FC93
- Depots: Tomiyoshi Depot; Koan Depot
- Lines served: D Osaka Line; E Nagoya Line; M Yamada Line; M Toba Line; M Shima Line

Specifications
- Maximum speed: 110 km/h (68 mph)
- Traction system: Mitsubishi Electric
- Power output: 160 kW (215 hp) per motor
- Bogies: KD-66/KD88
- Multiple working: 2410 series 2430 series
- Track gauge: 1,435 mm (4 ft 8 1/2 in)

The 1200 series is the final variant in the 1400 series family. Originally, 11 sets were built in 1982, but in 1983, 10 sets were converted into the 1201 series. The four remaining cars are coupled with two former 2430 series cars.

=== Formations ===
The sets are formed as follows.

Car No.	1	2	3	4
Numbering	Ku 2590	Mo 2450	Sa 1380	Mo 1200

=== Interior ===
Seating consists of longitudinal seating throughout.

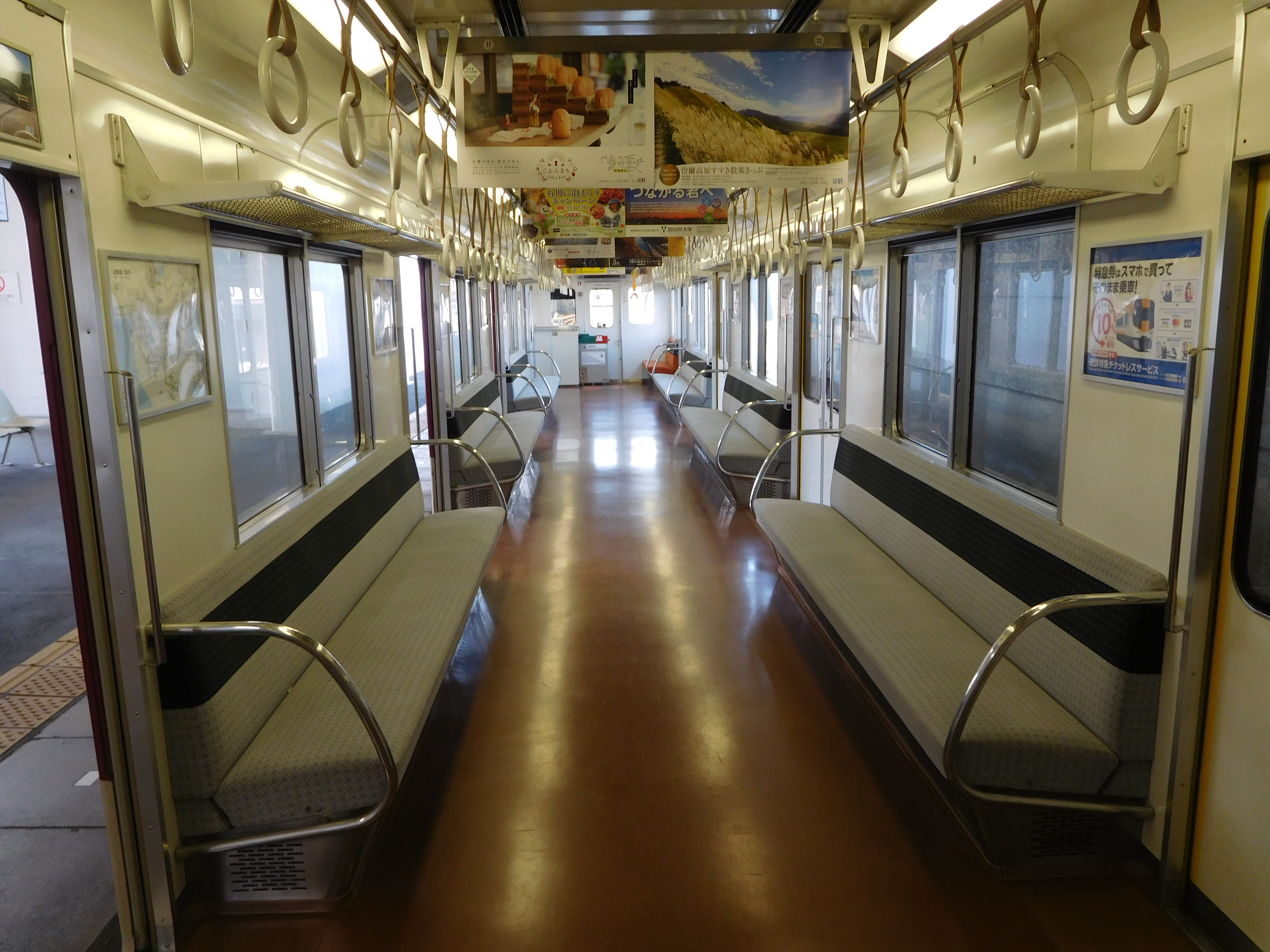
1201 series interior

== 1201 series ==
1201 series
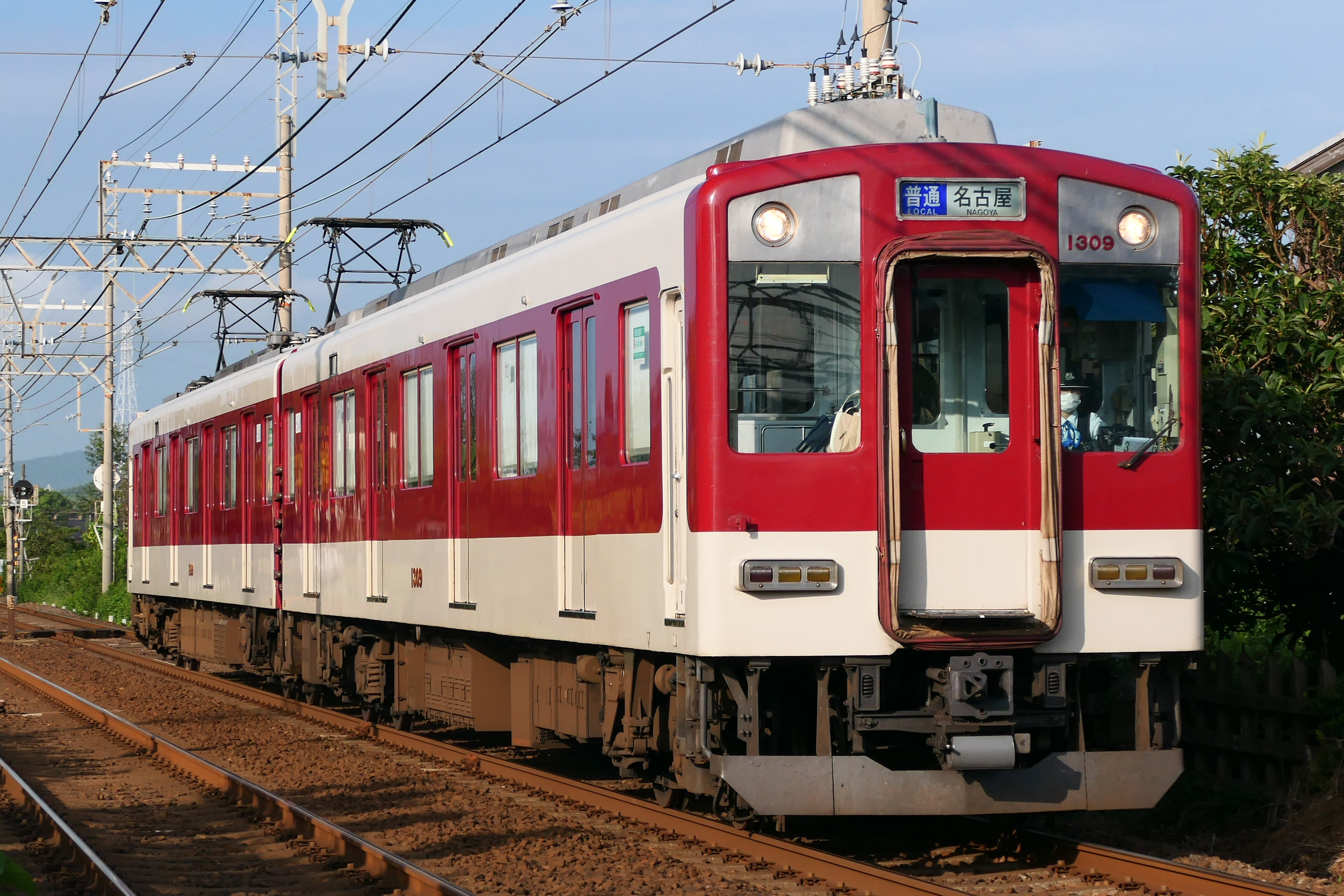
- Set 1209 in September 2023
- In service: 1982–present
- Replaced: 2250 series
- Constructed: 1982
- Refurbished: 2000–2003
- Number built: 10 sets (20 vehicles)
- Number in service: 10 sets (20 vehicles)
- Formation: 2 cars per trainset
- Fleet numbers: RC01–RC10
- Depots: Meisei Depot
- Lines served: D Osaka Line; E Nagoya Line; M Yamada Line; M Toba Line; M Shima Line

Specifications
- Maximum speed: 110 km/h (68 mph)
- Traction system: Mitsubishi Electric
- Power output: 160 kW (215 hp) per motor
- Bogies: KD-78/KD88
- Track gauge: 1,435 mm (4 ft 8 1/2 in)

The 1201 series are former 1200 series sets that were re-fitted for wanman (driver-only) operation.

=== Formations ===
Sets are formed as follows.

Car No.	1	2
Numbering	Ku 1301	Mo 1201

=== Interior ===
Seating consists of longitudinal seating throughout.

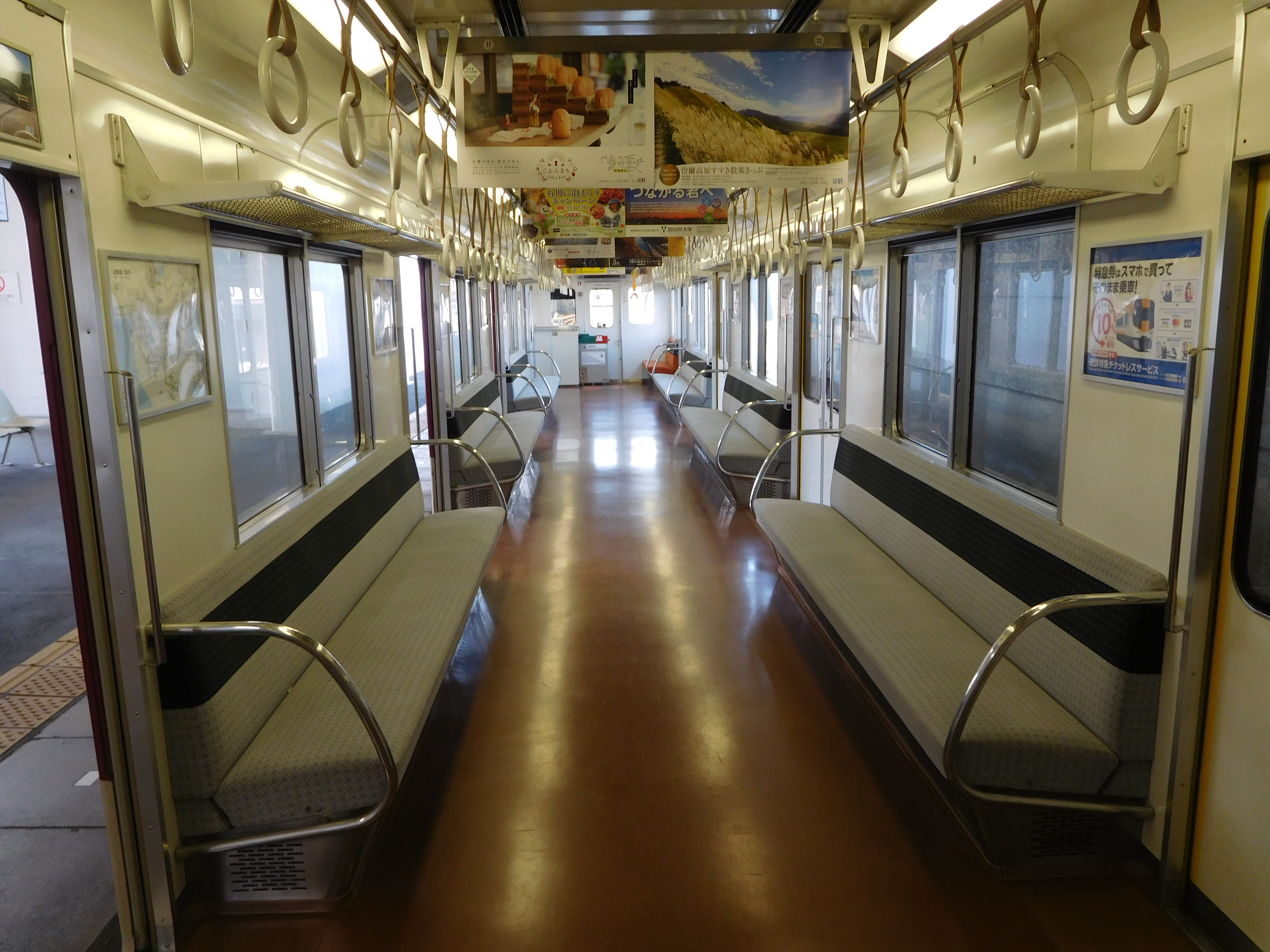
1201 series interior

== 1400 series ==
1400 series
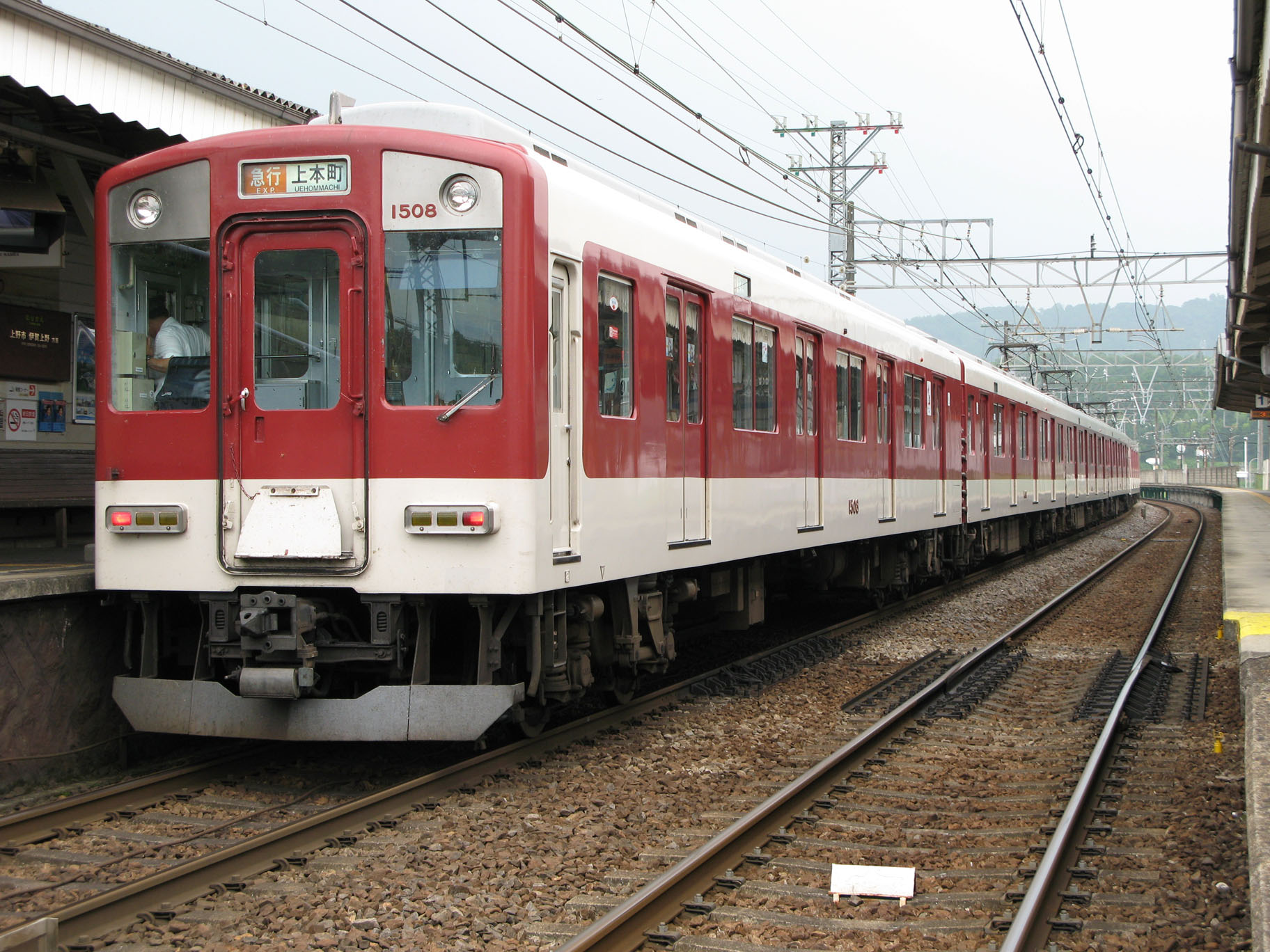
- A 1400 series bound for Uehommachi station
- In service: 1981–present
- Constructed: 1981
- Entered service: 1981
- Refurbished: 2000–2003
- Number built: 4 sets (16 vehicles)
- Number in service: 4 sets (16 vehicles)
- Formation: 4 cars per trainset
- Fleet numbers: FC01–FC07
- Depots: Koan Depot; Tomiyoshi Depot
- Lines served: D Osaka Line; E Nagoya Line; M Yamada Line; M Toba Line; M Shima Line

Specifications
- Maximum speed: 110 km/h (68 mph)
- Traction system: Mitsubishi Electric
- Power output: 160 kW (215 hp) per motor
- Bogies: KD-78/KD88
- Track gauge: 1,435 mm (4 ft 8 1/2 in)

The 1400 series is the original variant, having first appeared in February 1981. Four 4-car sets were built.

=== Formations ===
The four-car sets are formed as follows.

Car No.	1	2	3	4
Designation	Ku 1500	Mo 1400	Mo 1400	Ku 1500

=== Interior ===
Seating consists of longitudinal seating throughout.

== 2050 series ==
2050 series
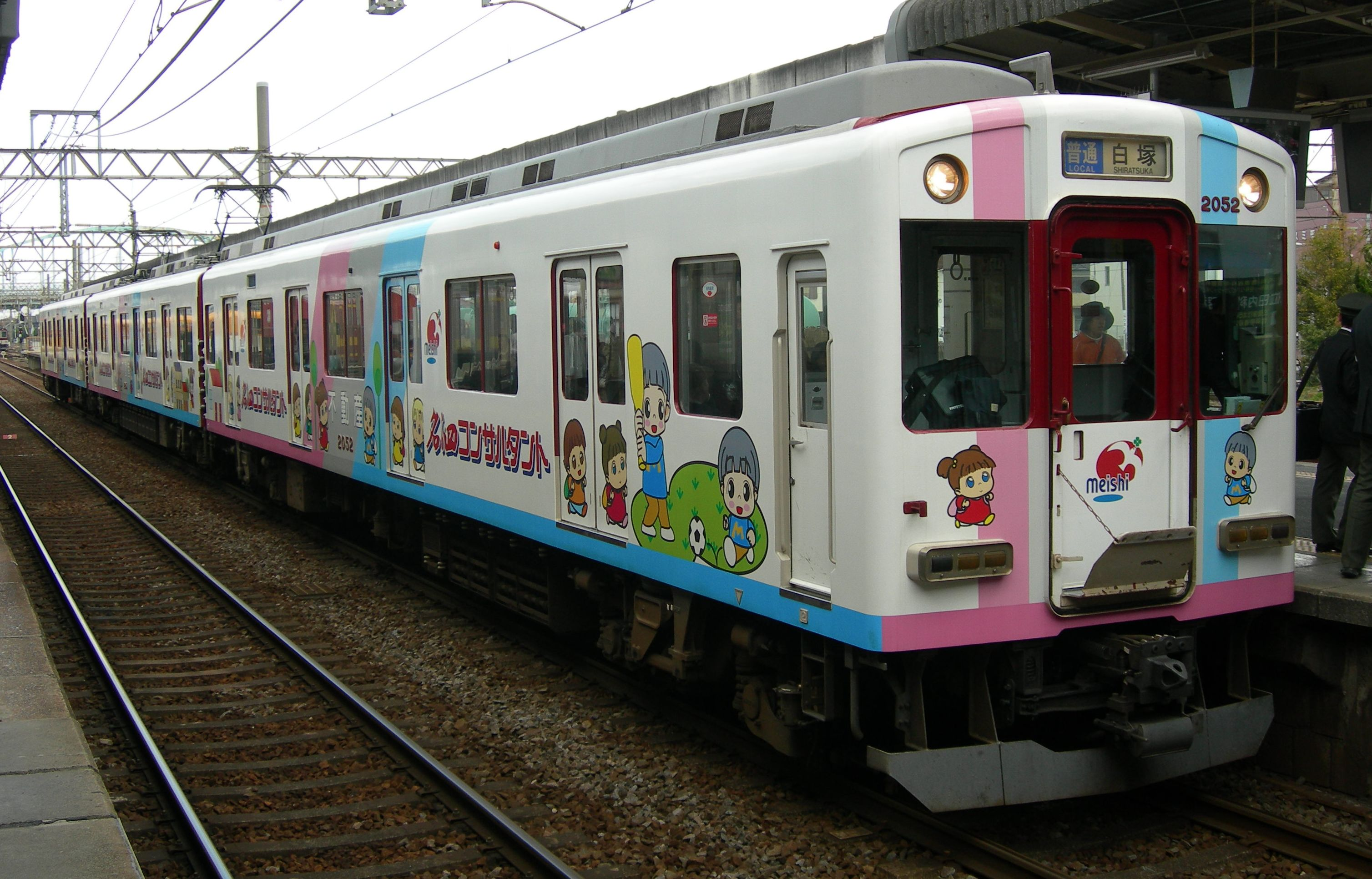
- A 2050 series at Shiohama Station
- In service: 1983–present
- Constructed: 1983
- Entered service: 1983
- Refurbished: 2002
- Number built: 2 sets (6 vehicles)
- Number in service: 2 sets (6 vehicles)
- Formation: 3 cars per trainset
- Fleet numbers: RC51–RC52
- Operators: Kintetsu Railway
- Depots: Meisei Depot
- Lines served: E Nagoya Line

Specifications
- Maximum speed: 110 km/h (68 mph)
- Traction system: Mitsubishi Electric
- Power output: 160 kW (215 hp) per motor
- Bogies: KD-78/KD88
- Track gauge: 1,435 mm (4 ft 8 1/2 in)

Two three-car sets were delivered in 1983 designated as the 2050 series.

=== Formations ===
The sites are formed as follows.

Car No.	1	2	3
Designation	Ku 2150	Mo 2050	Mo 2050

=== Interior ===
Seating consists of longitudinal seating throughout. Some cars have onboard toilets.

=== Refurbishment ===
In 2002, the sets were refurbished and modeled similar to the 1200 series. A second renovation occurred around 2020.

== 6600 series ==
6600 series
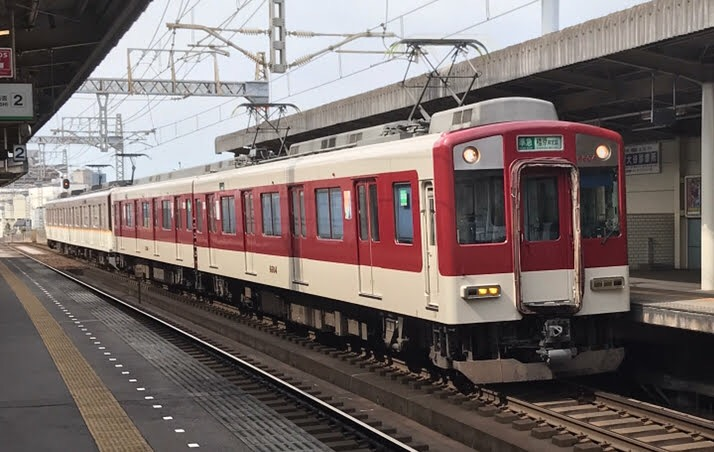
- A 6600 series at Koboreguchi Station
- In service: 1983–present
- Replaced: 6800 series and 6411 series
- Constructed: 1983
- Entered service: 1983
- Refurbished: 2001–2003
- Number built: 4 sets (8 vehicles)
- Number in service: 4 sets (8 vehicles)
- Formation: 2 cars per trainset
- Fleet numbers: FT01–FT04
- Operators: Kintetsu Railway
- Depots: Furuichi Depot
- Lines served: F Minami Osaka Line; P Gose Line

Specifications
- Maximum speed: 100 km/h (62 mph)
- Traction system: Mitsubishi Electric
- Power output: 150 kW (201 hp) per motor
- Bogies: KD-90/KD-90-A
- Multiple working: 6820 series
- Track gauge: 1,067 mm (3 ft 6 in)

Four two-car sets were delivered in 1983 designated as the 6600 series.

=== Operations ===
The sets are operated on the 1,067 mm (3 ft 6 in) Minami Osaka Line network. However, they are not allowed on the Domyoji Line as they are not equipped for wanman driver-only operation.

=== Formation ===
The sets are formed as follows. Both cars are motorized.

Car No.	1	2
Numbering	6700	6600

=== Interior ===
Seating consists of longitudinal seating throughout.
