= Kintetsu 16600 series =

Electric multiple unit train type operated in Japan by Kintetsu

Kintetsu 16600 series "Ace"
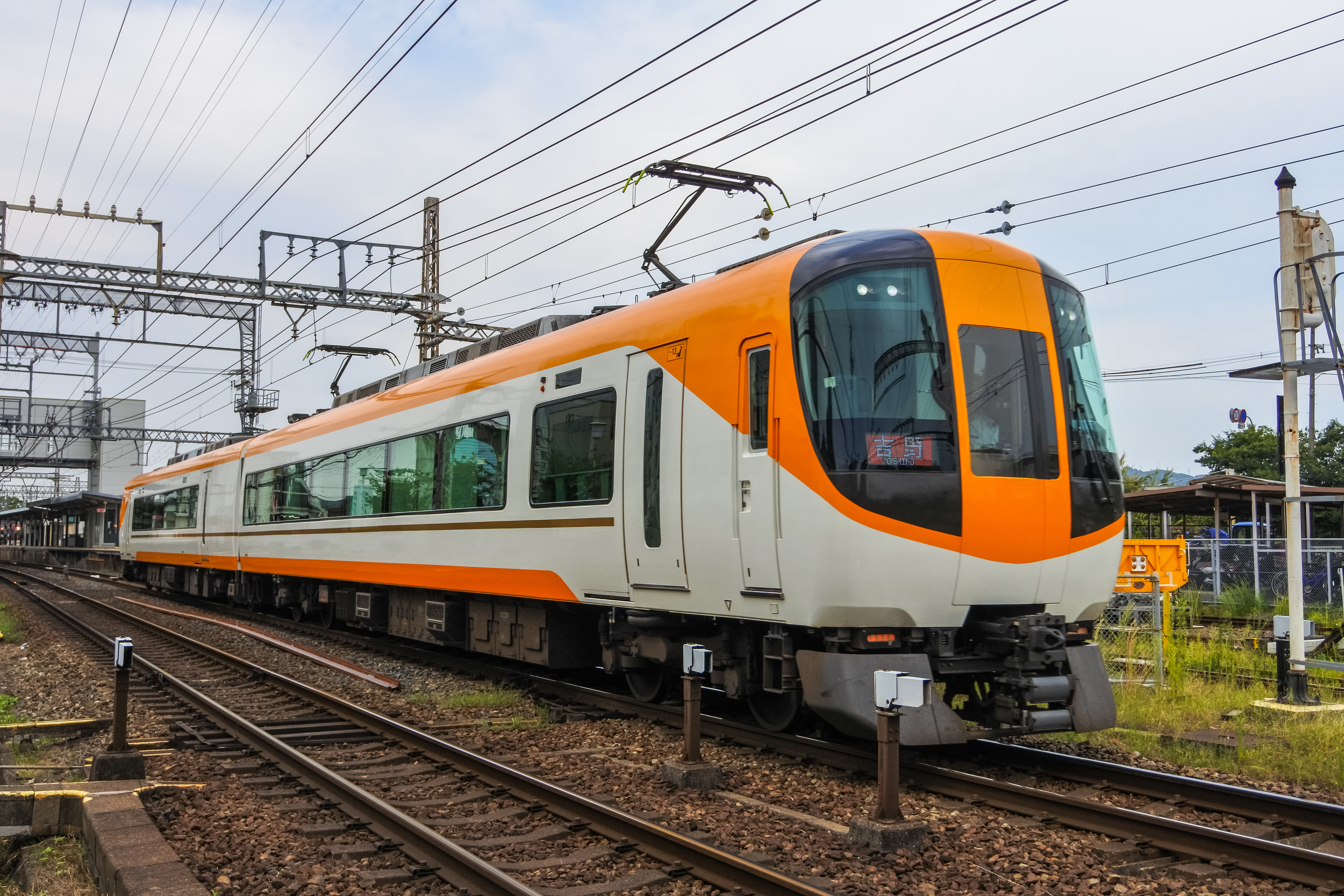
- A 16600 series 2-car set in the new Kintetsu limited express train livery in September 2017
- Manufacturer: Kinki Sharyo
- Family name: Ace
- Replaced: 16000 series
- Constructed: 2010–
- Entered service: 19 June 2010
- Number built: 4 vehicles (2 sets)
- Number in service: 4 vehicles (2 sets)
- Formation: 2 cars per trainset
- Fleet numbers: YT01 – YT02
- Operators: Kintetsu Railway
- Depots: Furuichi
- Lines served: Minami Osaka Line; Yoshino Line

Specifications
- Car body construction: Steel
- Car length: 20,800 mm (68 ft 3 in) (motor cars); 20,500 mm (67 ft 3 in) (trailers)
- Width: 2,800 mm (9 ft 2 in)
- Height: 4,150 mm (13 ft 7 in) (motor cars); 4,135 mm (13 ft 6.8 in) (trailers)
- Doors: Two plug doors per side
- Maximum speed: 110 km/h (70 mph)
- Traction system: 2-level PWM variable-frequency (IGBT)
- Acceleration: 2.5 km/(h⋅s) (1.6 mph/s)
- Deceleration: 4.0 km/(h⋅s) (2.5 mph/s)
- Electric system(s): 1,500 V DC, overhead line
- Current collection: Pantograph
- Bogies: Bolsterless; KD-316 (motor cars); KD-316A (trailers)
- Braking system(s): Electronically controlled pneumatic brakes
- Safety system(s): Kintetsu ATS (old/new)
- Multiple working: 16000/16010/16400 series
- Track gauge: 1,067 mm (3 ft 6 in)

The Kintetsu 16600 series "Ace" (近鉄16600系「Ace」) is a limited express electric multiple unit (EMU) train type operated by Kintetsu Railway in Japan since 19 June 2010.

== Operations ==
They are operated on the Minami Osaka and Yoshino Lines, replacing the earlier 16000 series trains.

== Design ==
The design is based on the Kintetsu 22600 series trains used on the standard gauge Osaka and Nara Lines since 2009.

== Formation ==
As of 1 April 2016, two two-car sets are in operation, formed as follows, with one motored ("Mc") car and one non-powered trailer ("Tc") car.

Car No.	1	2
Designation	Tc	Mc
Numbering	1670x	1660x

Car 2 has two single-arm pantographs.

== Interior ==
Car 1 has a wheelchair space and toilet. Car 2 has a smoking compartment.

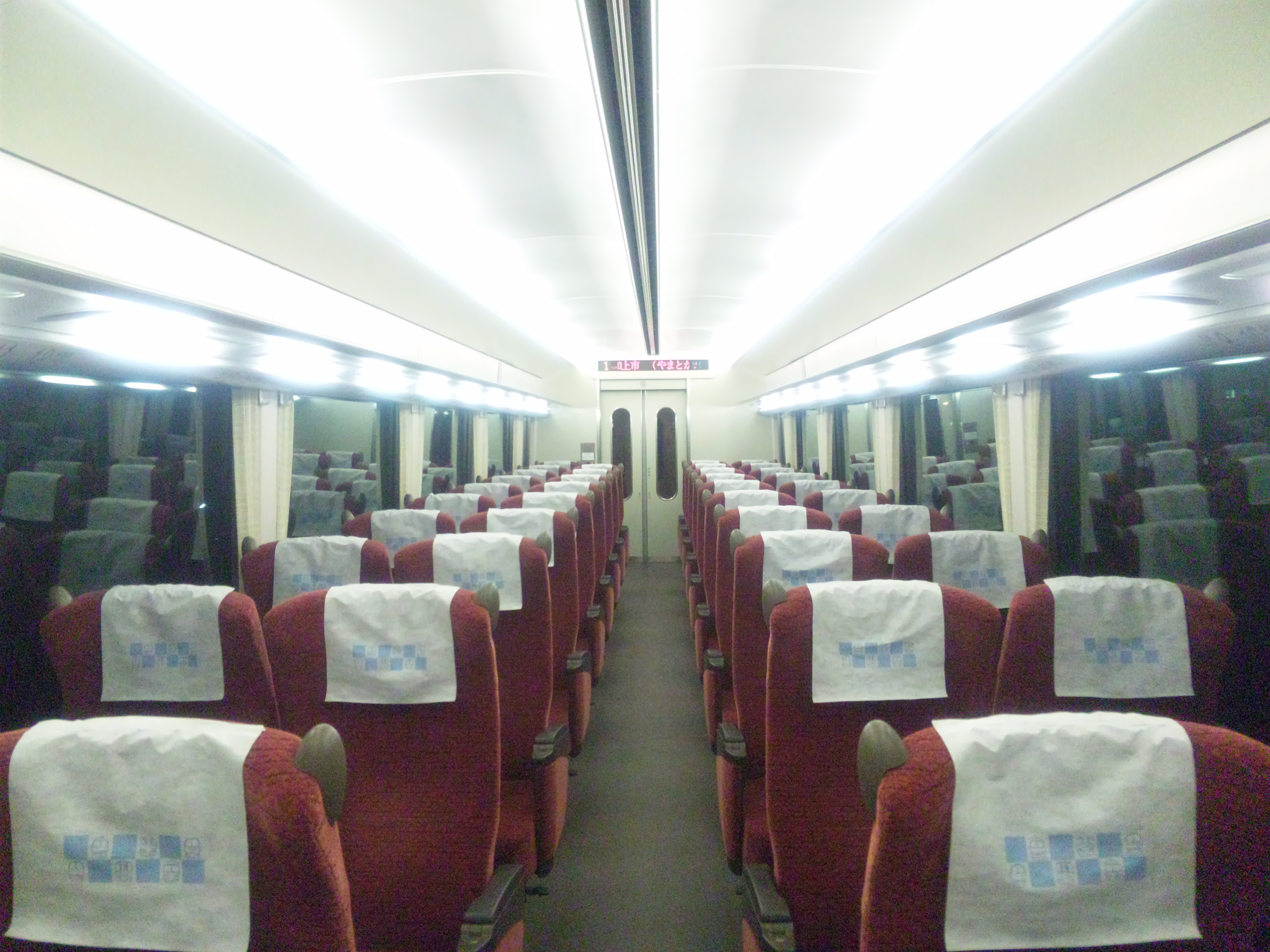
Interior view

== History ==
Two two-car sets were built at a cost of approximately 800 million yen. Test running commenced in May 2010, with entry into revenue service from 19 June 2010.

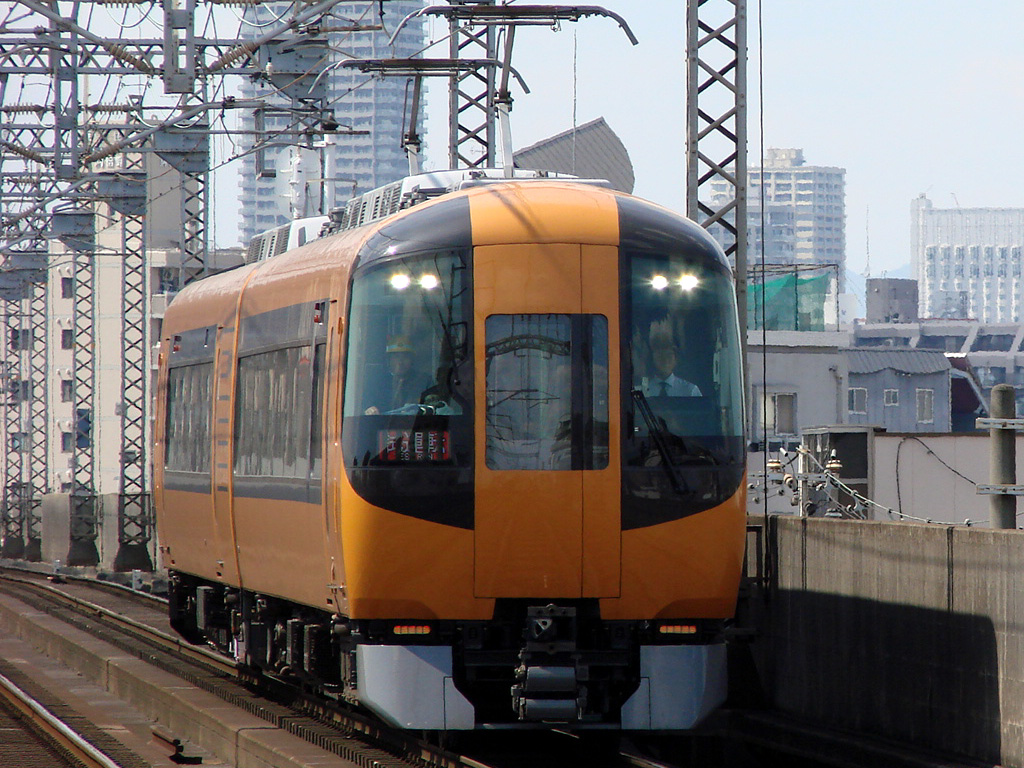
A two car set in original livery on test in May 2010
