= Kintetsu 26000 series =

Japanese train type

Kintetsu 26000 series Sakura Liner
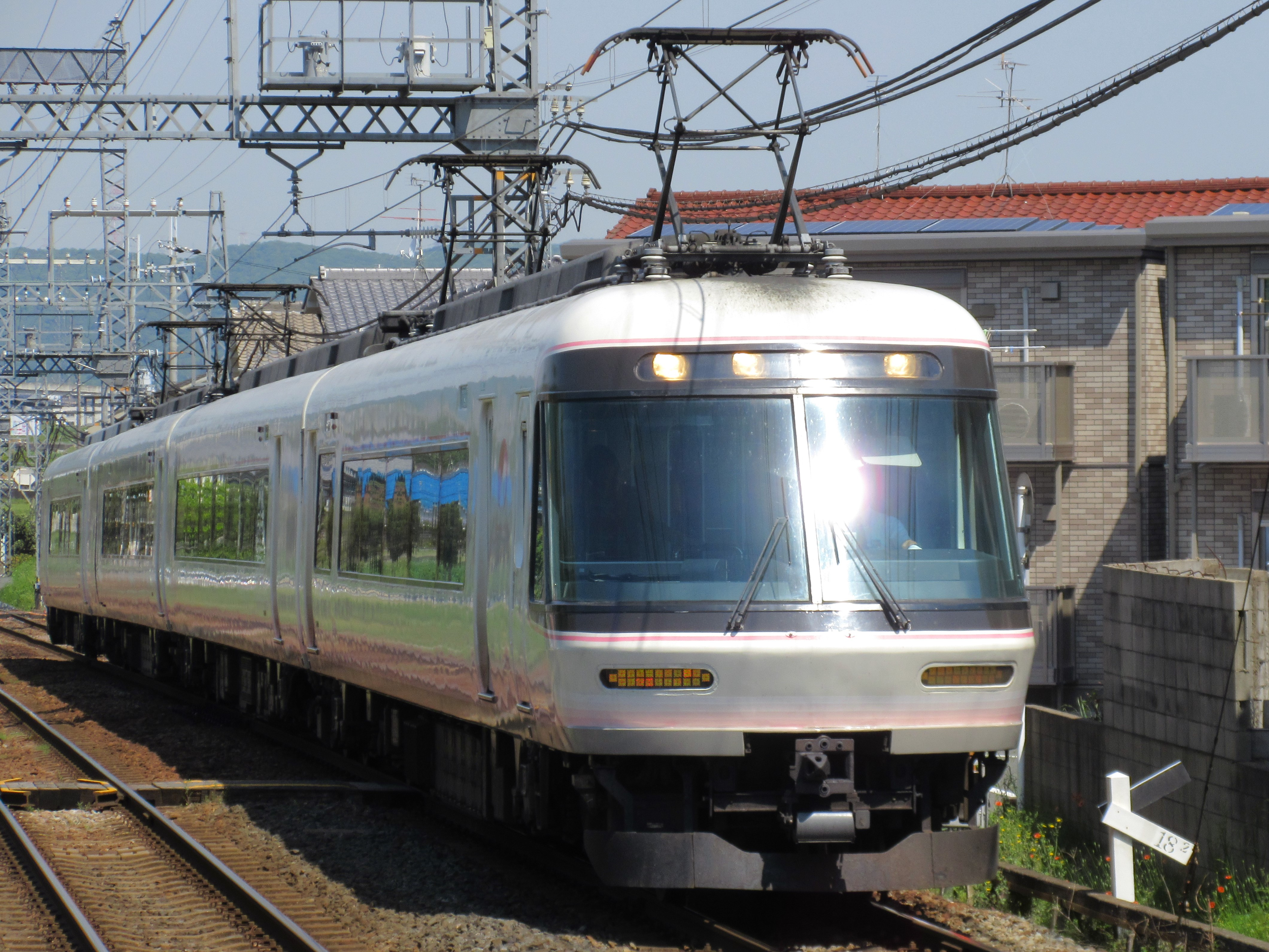
- Set 26101 at Taimadera Station in 2016
- In service: 15 March 1990 – present
- Manufacturer: Kinki Sharyo
- Family name: Sakura Liner
- Constructed: 1989
- Refurbished: 2010–2011
- Number built: 8 vehicles (2 sets)
- Number in service: 8 vehicles (2 sets)
- Formation: 4 cars per trainset
- Fleet numbers: SL01–SL02
- Capacity: 226
- Operators: Kintetsu Railway

Specifications
- Car body construction: Steel
- Car length: 20.7 m (67 ft 11 in) (end cars); 20.5 m (67 ft 3 in) (intermediate cars)
- Width: 2,800 mm (9 ft 2 in)
- Height: 4,150 mm (13 ft 7 in)
- Doors: 2 per side (end cars), 1 per side (intermediate cars)
- Maximum speed: 110 km/h (68 mph)
- Traction system: Resistor control
- Acceleration: 2.5 km/(h⋅s) (1.6 mph/s)
- Deceleration: 4.0 km/(h⋅s) (2.5 mph/s)
- Electric system(s): 1,500 V DC
- Current collection: Overhead line
- Bogies: KD-99
- Safety system(s): ATS
- Track gauge: 1,067 mm (3 ft 6 in)

The Kintetsu 26000 series (近鉄26000系) is an electric multiple unit (EMU) train type operated by Japanese private railway operator Kintetsu Railway since March 1990.

== Operations ==
The trains entered revenue service on 15 March 1990. They are branded "Sakura Liner". A special supplement is required to travel on these services, in addition to the basic fare and limited express charge.

== Formation ==
The two four-car trains are formed as shown below. All cars are powered.

Car No.	1	2	3	4
Numbering	Mo 2640x	Mo 2630x	Mo 2620x	Mo 2610x
Capacity	48	50	48	40
Facilities	Observation	Wheelchair accessible (WC) toilets	Toilets	Smoking compartment, observation

Cars 2 and 4 are fitted with 2 lozenge-type pantographs.

== Interior ==
Seating in cars 1, 2 and 4 are arranged 2+2 transverse, with a seat pitch of 1,050 mm (41 in). Car 3 is a deluxe car and features rotating and reclining seats arranged 2+1 transverse with AC outlets built into the armrest and tables which fold out. Cars 2 and 3 come with heated toilets and are equipped with automatic bidets.

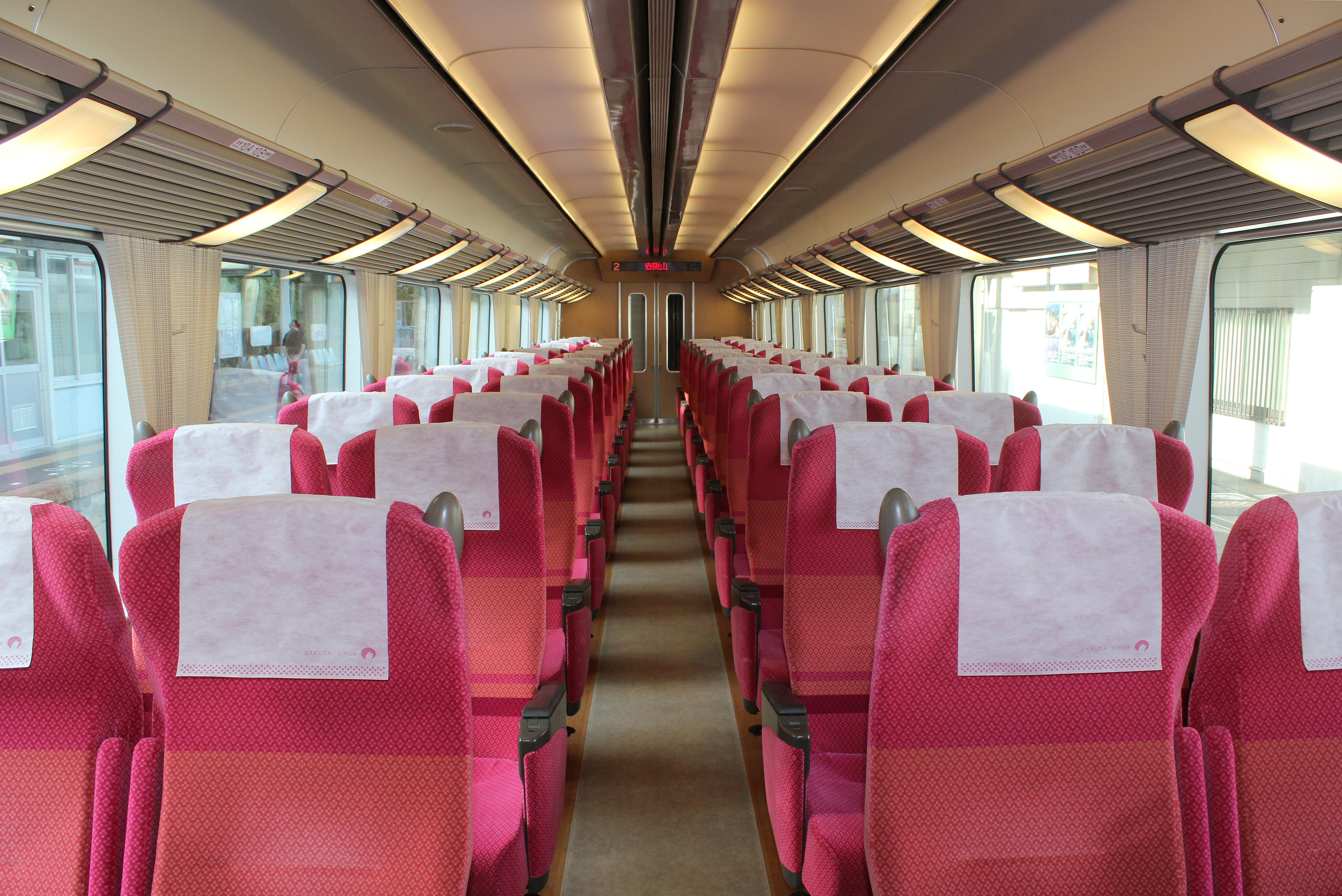
Standard car seating

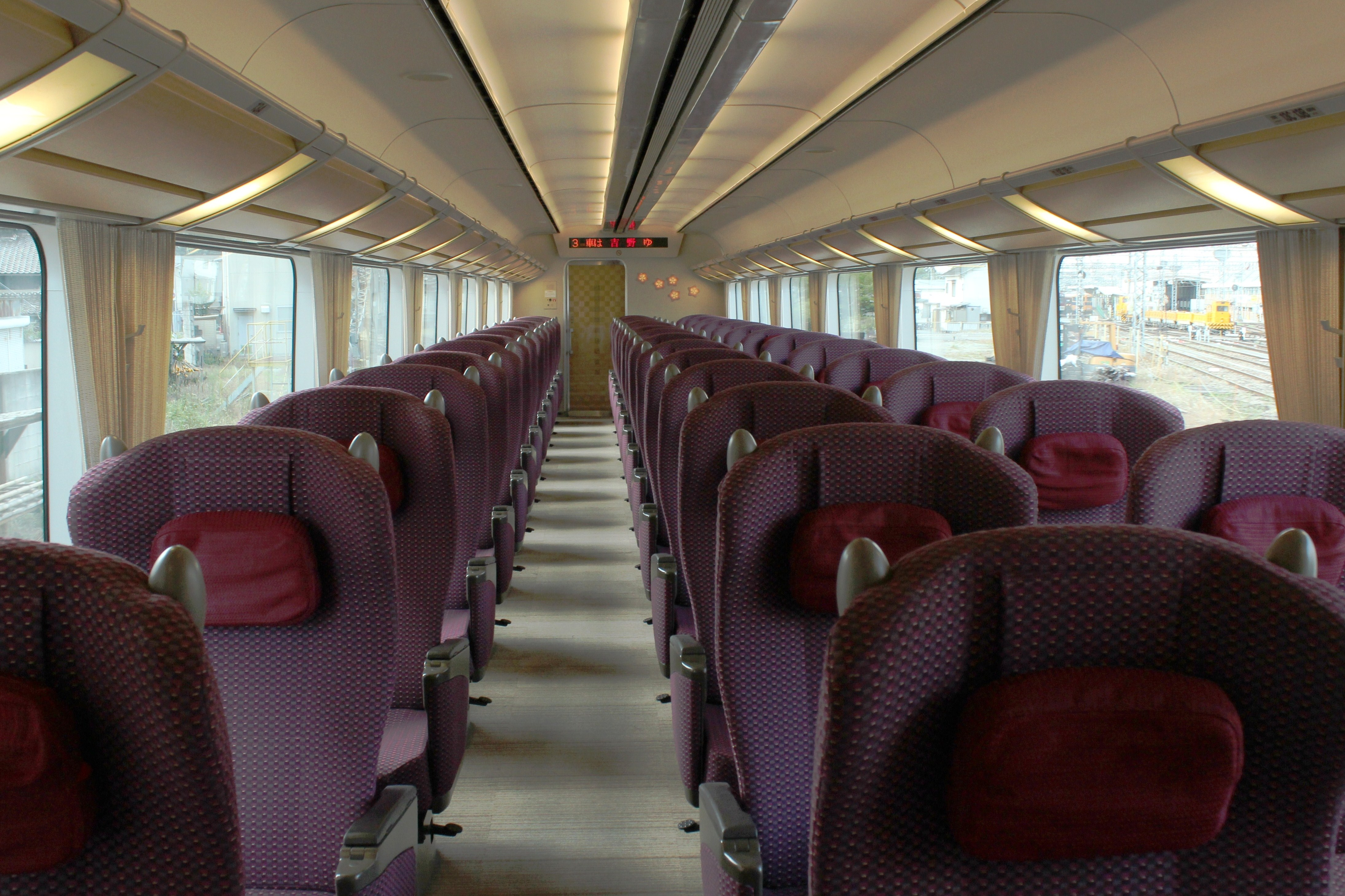
Deluxe car seating

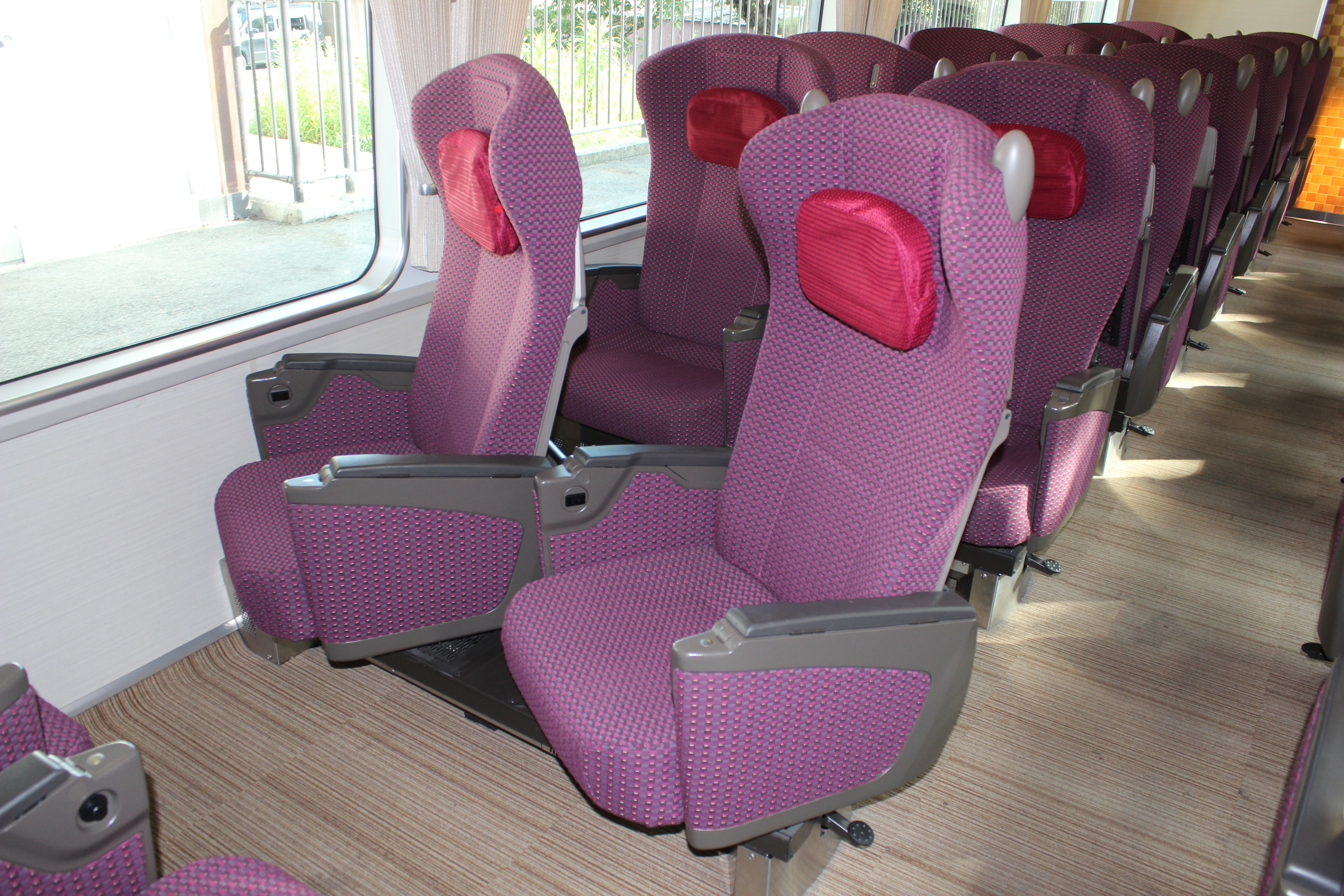
Rotating seats

== Exterior ==
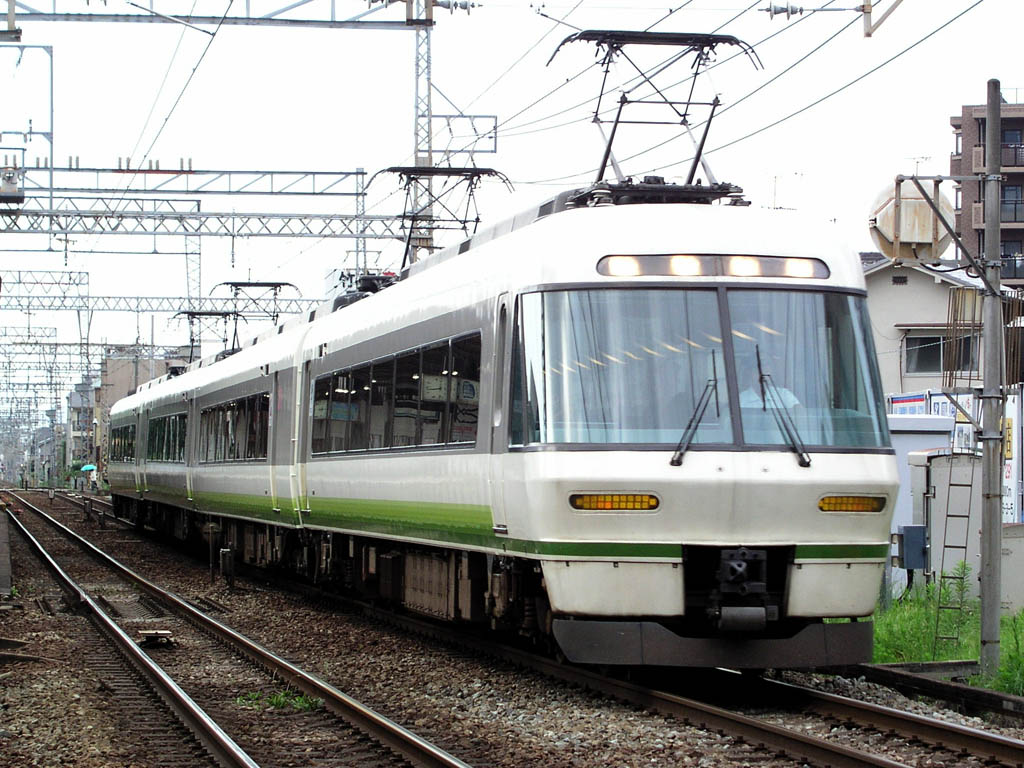
26000 series with original livery in July 2006

The trains are painted in a pink and crystal white livery, reminiscent of cherry blossoms. Trains were originally painted in a green and crystal white livery, but it was later changed to invoke the "Sakura Liner" name.

== History ==
The train entered service on 15 March 1990, and have been used for special services. The trains were refurbished in 2010 where they received an updated livery to invoke the "Sakura Liner" name.
