= Fujiidera Station =

Railway station in Fujidera, Osaka Prefecture, Japan

Fujiidera Station 藤井寺駅
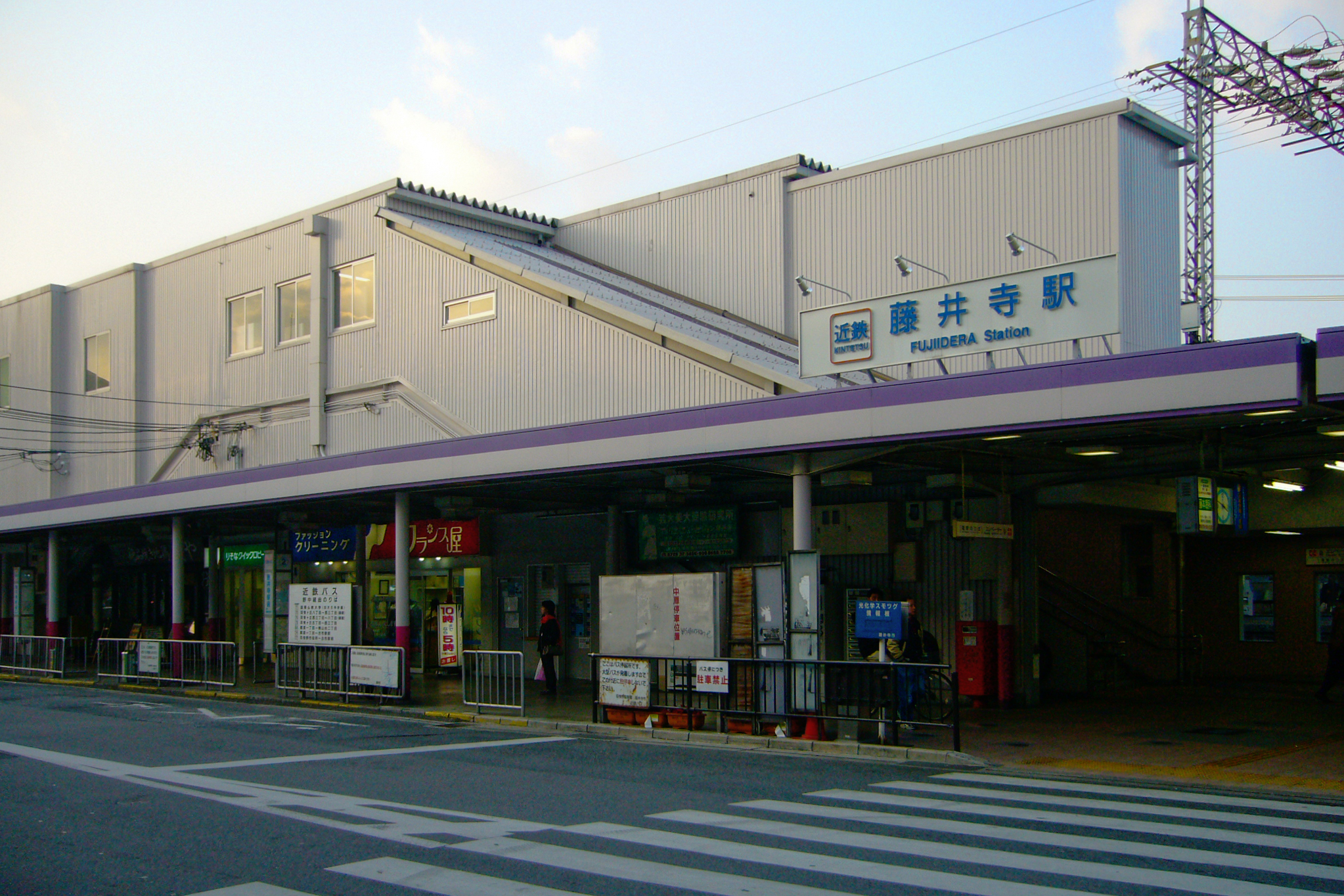
- Fujiidera Station, December 2005

General information
- Location: 7-18, Oka 2-chome, Fujiidera-shi, Osaka-fu 583-0027; Japan
- Coordinates: 34°34′17.52″N 135°35′39.99″E
- Operator: Kintetsu Railway
- Line: Minami Osaka Line
- Distance: 13.7 km (8.5 mi) from Ōsaka Abenobashi
- Platforms: 2 island platforms
- Connections

Other information
- Station code: F13
- Website: Official website

History
- Opened: April 18, 1922; 104 years ago

Passengers
- FY2018: 35,802 daily
Location
- Location within Osaka Prefecture Location within Japan

Fujiidera Station (藤井寺駅, Fujiidera-eki) is a passenger railway station in located in the city of Fujiidera, Osaka Prefecture, Japan, operated by the private railway operator Kintetsu Railway. It is the main station of the city and was the nearest station to Fujiidera Stadium, formerly the home of the Kintetsu Buffaloes.

== Lines ==
Fujiidera Station is served by the Minami Osaka Line, and is located 13.7 rail kilometers from the starting point of the line at Ōsaka Abenobashi Station.

== Station layout ==
The station was consists of two ground-level island platforms connected by an elevated station building. There is a storage track in the west of the station, extending from Track 1.

=== Platforms ===
1, 2	■ Minami-Osaka Line	for Furuichi, Kashiharajingu-mae, Yoshino and Kawachinagano
3, 4	■ Minami-Osaka Line	for Osaka Abenobashi

== Adjacent stations ==
«	Service	»
Minami Osaka Line
Takawashi	Local	Hajinosato
Kawachi-Matsubara	Semi-Express	Hajinosato
Suburban Express: Does not stop at this station
Express: Does not stop at this station
Limited Express: Does not stop at this station

== History ==
Fujiidera Station opened on April 18, 1922.

== Passenger statistics ==
In fiscal 2018, the station was used by an average of 35,802 passengers daily.

== Surrounding area ==
- AEON Mall Fujiidera
- Fujiidera City Hall
- Fujii-dera (Kansai Kannon Pilgrimage No. 5)
- Fujiidera Elementary School
- Fujiidera-nishi Elementary School
- Fujiidera Junior High School
- Osaka Women's Junior College, Junior College High School
- Osaka Prefectural Fujiidera Technology High School
- Shitennoji Gakuen Elementary School

== Bus stops ==
These bus services are operated by Kintetsu Bus Co., Ltd.

South side

- Bus stop 1
  - Route 71 for Shitennoji University via Fujigaoka, Nonaka and Karusato
  - Route 78 for Shitennoji University via Fujigaoka and Nonoue
- Bus stop 2 (for Fujigaoka and Nonaka)
  - Route 72 for Fujigaoka, Nonaka, Habikigaoka Hatchome and Habikigaoka-nishi Sanchome
  - Route 73 for Habikigaoka-nishi Sanchome via Fujigaoka, Nonaka and Habikigaoka-nishi Nichome
  - Route 74 for Furuichi-ekimae via Fujigaoka and Nonaka
  - Route 75 for Fujigaoka, Nonaka, Habikigaoka-nishi Sanchome, Habikigaoka Hatchome
  - Route 77 for Furuichi-ekimae via Fujigaoka and Habikino City Hall
  - Route 84 for Gakuen-mae Gochome via Nonaka, Habikiyama Jutaku-mae, Momoyamadai Nichome
- Bus stop 3 (for Nonoue)
  - Route 61 for Shitennoji University via Nonoue and Habikiyama Jutaku-mae
  - Route 62 for Nonoue, Habikigaoka Hatchome and Habikigaoka-nishi Sanchome
  - Route 63 for Habikigaoka-nishi Sanchome via Nonoue and Habikigaoka-nishi Nichome
  - Route 64 for Furuichi-ekimae via Nonoue and Karusato Sanchome
  - Route 65 for Nonoue, Habikigaoka-nishi Sanchome, Habikigaoka Hatchome
  - Route 66 for Habikigaoka-nishi Nichome-higashi via Nonoue and Habikigaoka Hatchome
  - Route 83 for Gakuen-mae Gochome via Nonoue, Habikiyama Jutaku-mae, Momoyamadai Nichome

North side

- Route 70 for Kintetsu Yao-ekimae via Yaominami-ekimae, Minami-Taishido and JR Yao-ekimae
- Route 71 for Minami-Taishido via Yaominami-ekimae
- the "Flying Liner" for Yokohama Station West Gate, Tokyo Station Yaesu Dori and Tohoku Kyuko Bus Tokyo Office

== See also ==
- List of railway stations in Japan
