= Kintetsu 22600 series =

Japanese train type

Kintetsu 22600 series "Ace"
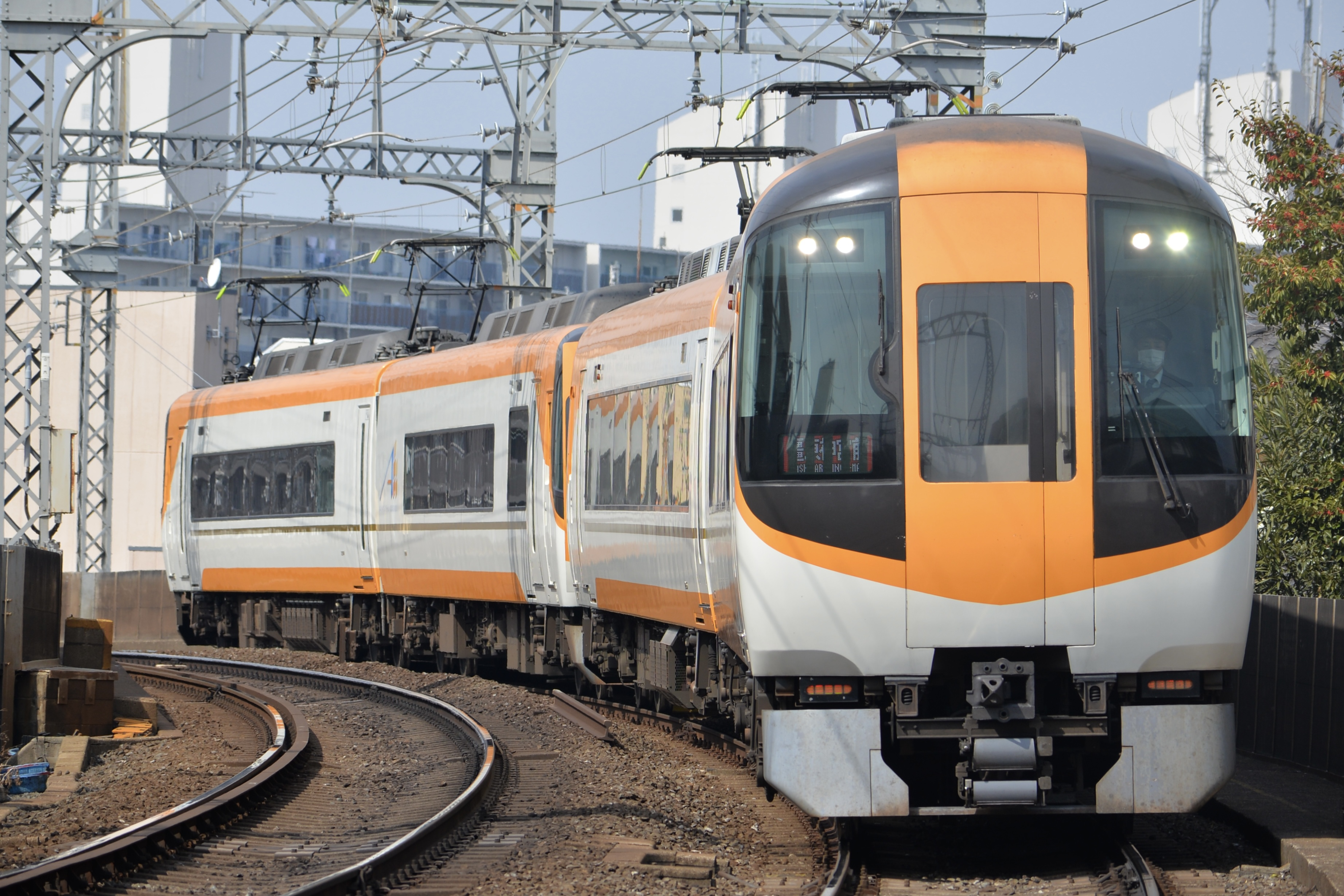
- 22600 series formation in March 2022
- In service: 2009–present
- Manufacturer: Kinki Sharyo
- Replaced: 12200 series
- Constructed: 2009–
- Entered service: 1 April 2009
- Number built: 32 vehicles (12 × 2-car sets; 2 × 4-car sets)
- Formation: 2/4 cars per trainset
- Fleet numbers: AT51–AT62 (2-car sets); AF01–AF02 (4-car sets)
- Capacity: 96 (2-car sets), 206 (4-car sets)
- Operators: Kintetsu Railway
- Depots: Saidaiji, Takayasu, Myojo, Tomiyoshi
- Lines served: Kintetsu Namba Line; Kintetsu Nara Line; Kintetsu Kyoto Line; Kintetsu Kashihara Line; Kintetsu Osaka Line; Kintetsu Nagoya Line; Kintetsu Yamada Line; Kintetsu Toba Line; Kintetsu Shima Line; Hanshin Main Line

Specifications
- Car length: 20,800 mm (68 ft 3 in) (end cars); 20,500 mm (67 ft 3 in) (intermediate cars)
- Width: 2,800 mm (9 ft 2 in)
- Height: 4,150 mm (13 ft 7 in) (motor cars); 4,135 mm (13 ft 6.8 in) (trailers)
- Doors: Two plug doors per side
- Maximum speed: 130 km/h (80 mph)
- Traction system: 2-level PWM variable-frequency (using IGBT)
- Traction motors: MB-5097B three phase induction motor
- Power output: 230 kW (310 hp) × 4 per motor car
- Acceleration: 2.5 km/(h⋅s) (1.6 mph/s)
- Deceleration: 4.0 km/(h⋅s) (2.5 mph/s)
- Electric system(s): 1,500 V DC overhead line
- Current collection: Pantograph
- Bogies: Bolsterless; KD-314B (motor); KD-314C (trailer)
- Braking system(s): Electronically controlled pneumatic brakes
- Safety system(s): Kintetsu ATS (old/new); Hanshin ATS
- Multiple working: 12400/12410/12600 series; 22000 series; 30000 series
- Track gauge: 1,435 mm (4 ft 8 1/2 in)

Notes/references
- Specification sources

The Kintetsu 22600 series "Ace" (近鉄22600系「Ace」) is a limited express electric multiple unit (EMU) train type operated by Kintetsu Railway since 1 April 2009.

Based on the earlier 22000 series design, each set features AC power outlets for passenger use, and a smoking compartment at one end of each set. Compared with the earlier 22000 series, seat pitch has been increased by 50 mm (2 in) to 1,050 mm (41 in).

== Interior ==
Passenger accommodation consists of 2+2 abreast seating throughout. The seats have a 1,050 mm (41 in) seat pitch, a 50 mm (2 in) increase over the seat pitch of the earlier 22000 series. Several amenities, such as AC power outlets and footrests, are provided. The "Sa 22700" cars are equipped with universal-access toilets and men's toilets, and the "Ku 22900" cars are equipped with men's, women's, and unisex toilets. The "Ku 22900" cars also feature smoking compartments.

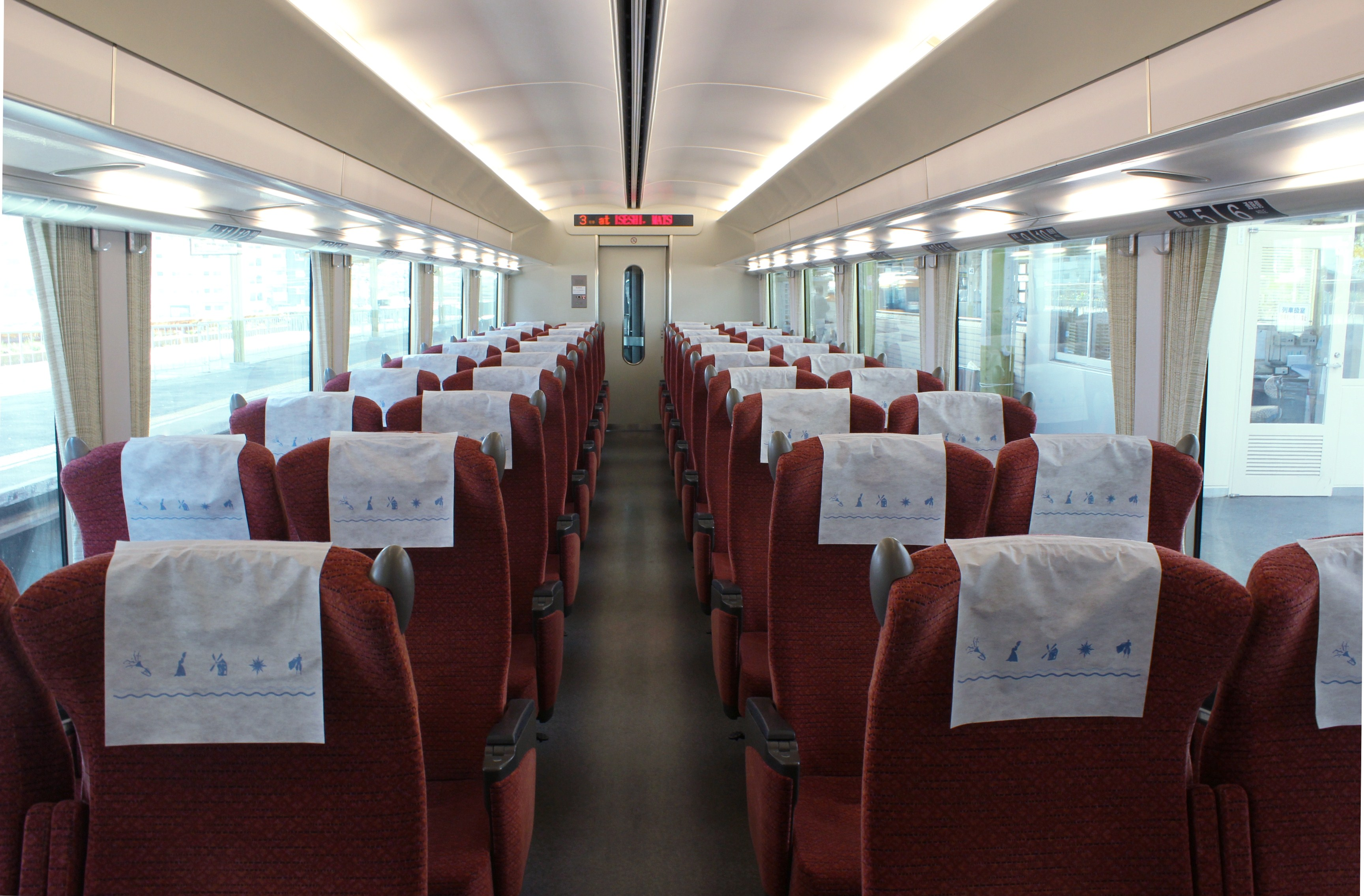
Interior

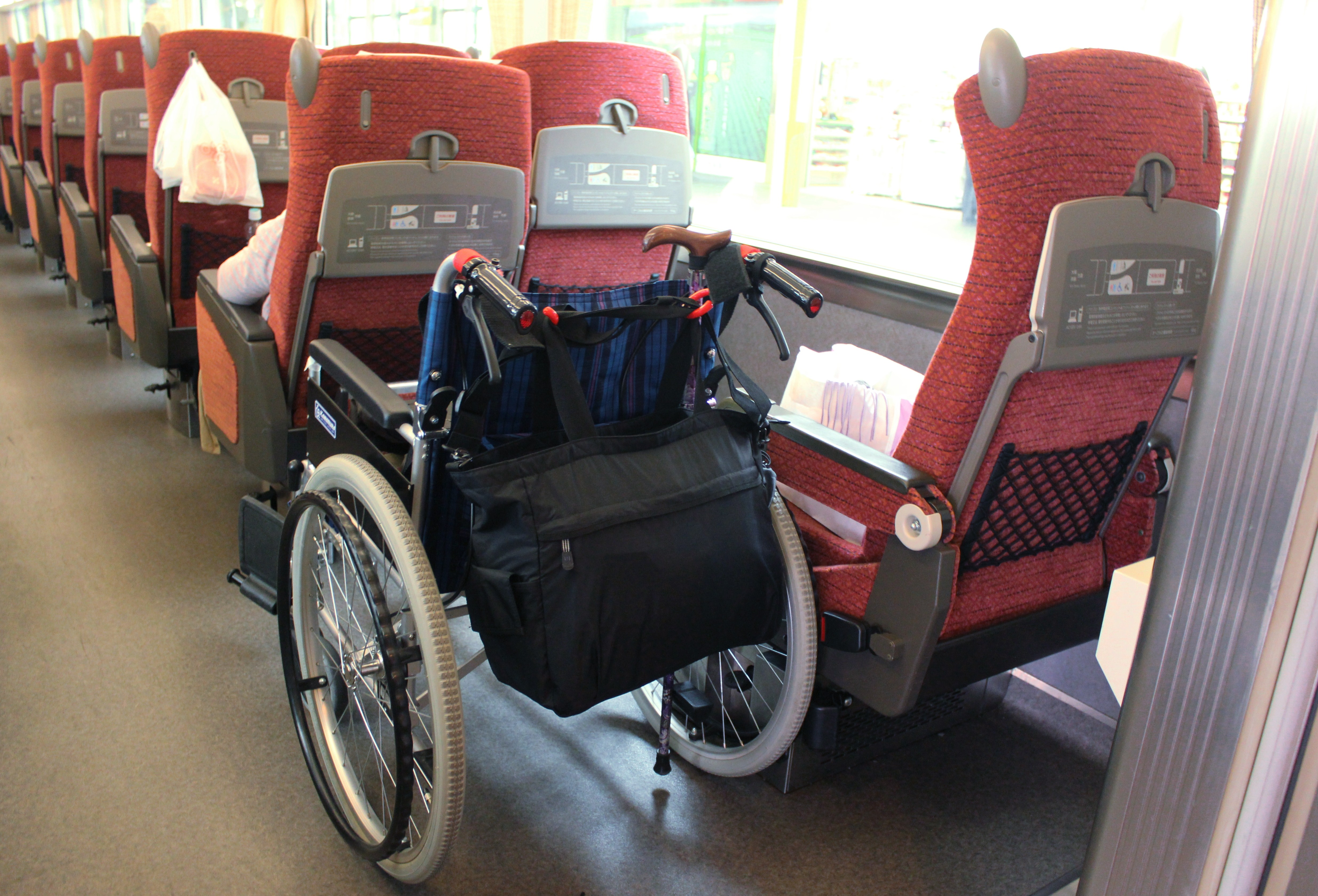
Wheelchair space

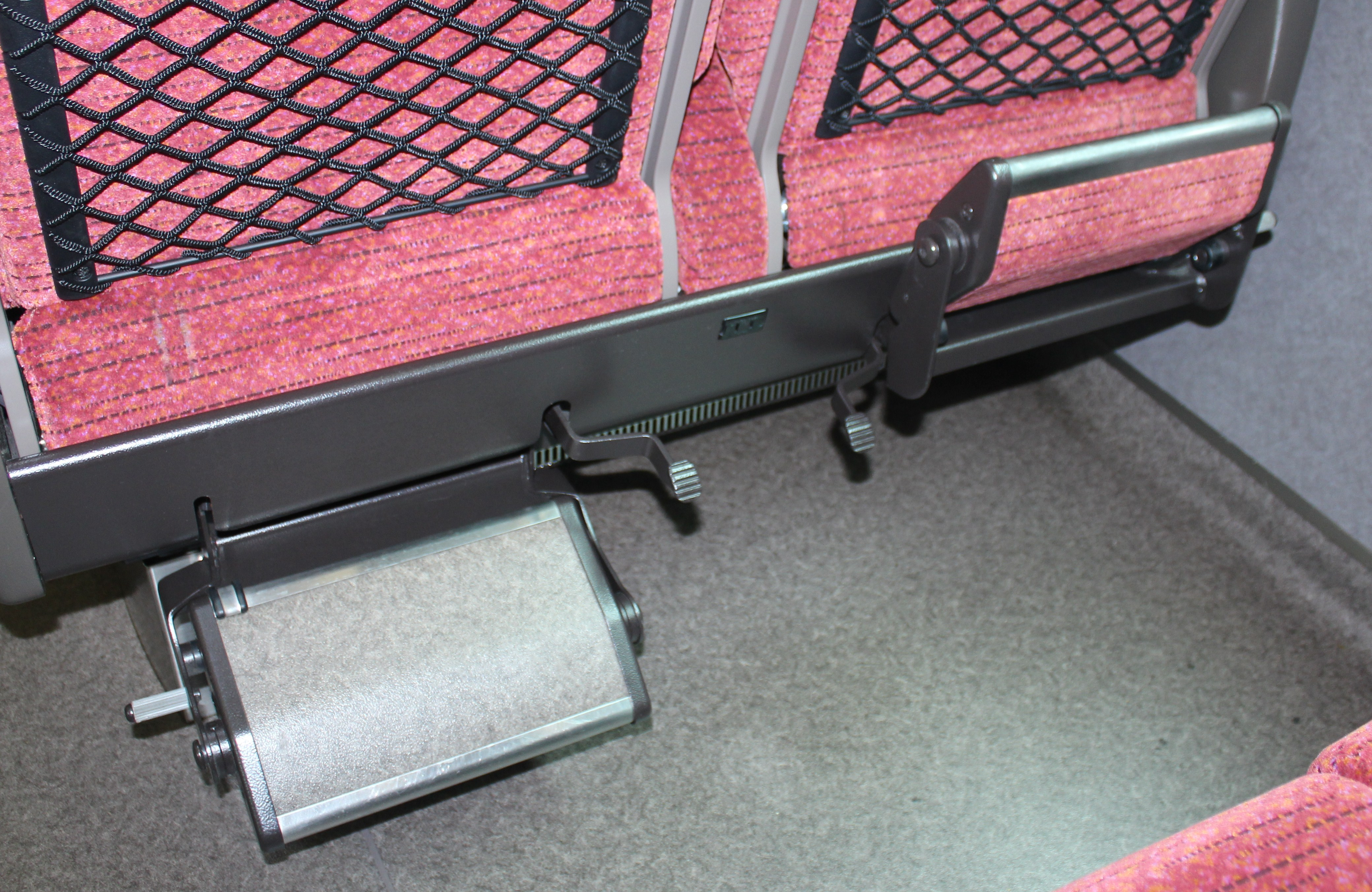
Footrests and power outlets

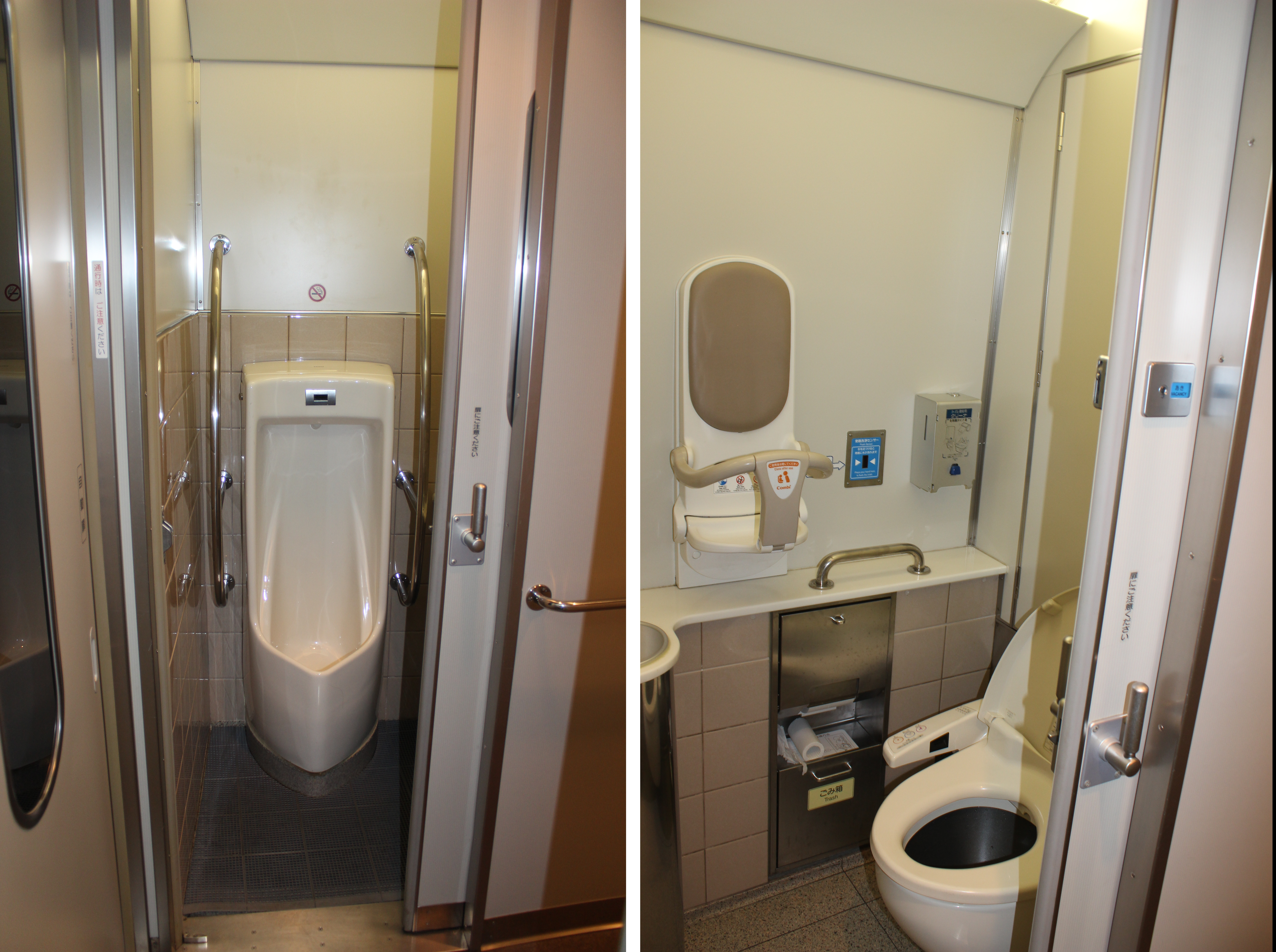
Men's toilet (left); unisex toilet (right)

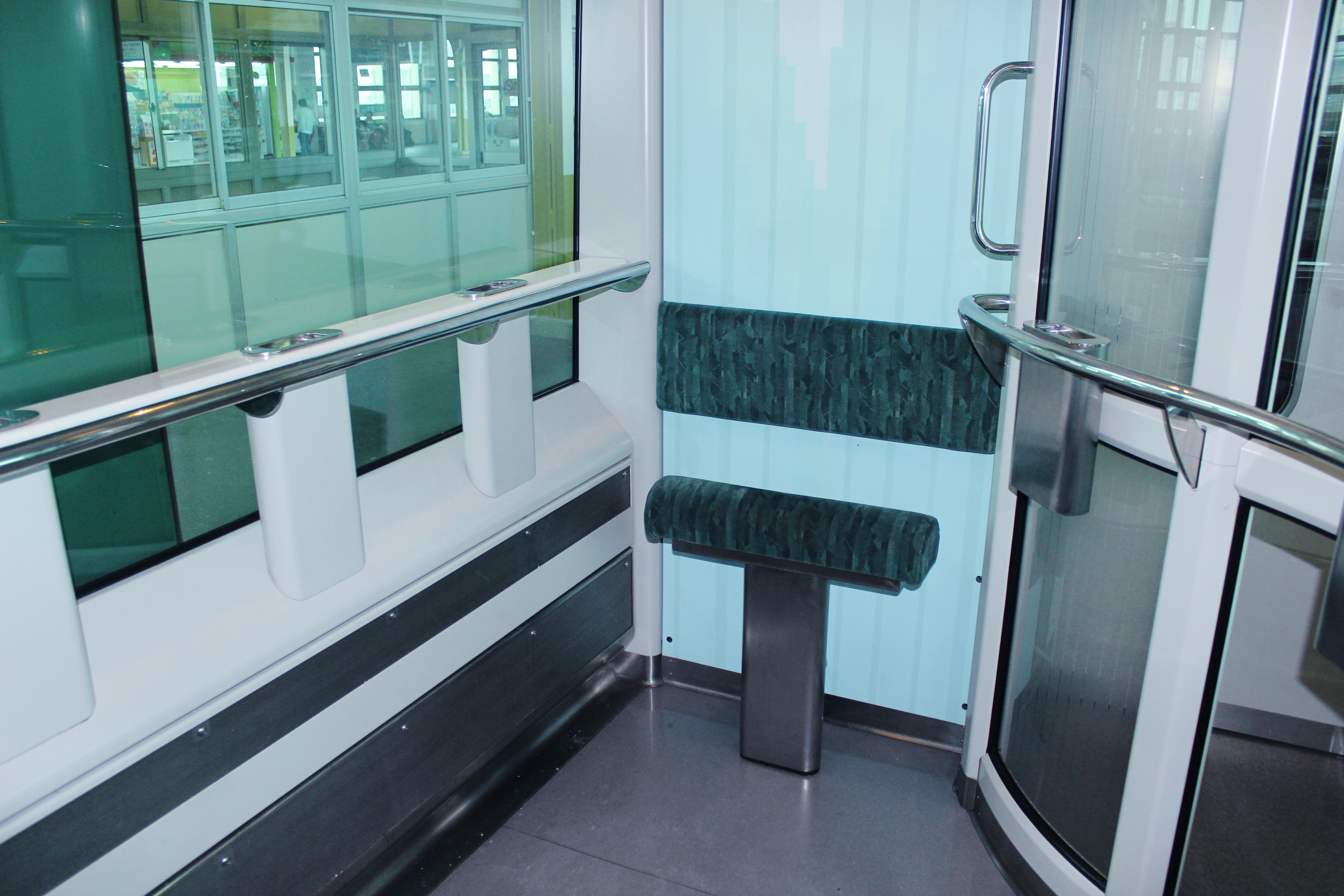
Smoking compartment

== Formations ==
=== 4-car sets ===
The 4-car sets (AF01–AF02) are formed as follows.

	← Osaka Namba Kintetsu Nagoya →			
Car No.	4	3	2	1
Designation	Mo 22600 (Mc)	Sa 22700 (T)	Mo 22800 (M)	Ku 22900 (Tc)
Capacity	56	54	56	40
Weight (t)	47.0	39.0	44.0	43.0

- Car 1 is equipped with a smoking compartment.
- Cars 1 and 3 are equipped with toilets.
- Cars 2 and 4 are each equipped with one PT7126-A single-arm pantograph.
- Car 3 is equipped with two wheelchair spaces.

=== 2-car sets ===
The 2-car sets (AT51 onward) are formed as follows.

	← Namba Nagoya →	
Car No.	2	1
Designation	Mo 22600 (Mc')	Ku 22900 (Tc')
Capacity	56	40
Weight (t)	47.0	43.0

- Car 1 is equipped with men's, women's, and unisex toilets (one of each) and a smoking compartment.
- Car 2 is equipped with two PT7126-A single-arm pantographs.

== History ==
Details of the 22600 series were first announced on 11 December 2008. Initially, 10 vehicles were introduced, at a cost of approximately 1.9 billion yen, formed as two 4-car sets and one 2-car set. A further 22 vehicles (eleven 2-car sets) were delivered from Kinki Sharyo between 2009 and 2010.

In 2010, the 22600 series received the Laurel Prize, presented annually by the Japan Railfan Club.

On 23 January 2014, Kintetsu and Hanshin Electric Railway both announced plans to operate through-service chartered trains, primarily on Saturdays and holidays, between Kobe-Sannomiya Station on the Hanshin Main Line and Kashikojima Station on the Kintetsu Shima Line, using 22600 series trainsets. These services commenced on 22 March 2014.

In 2015, Kintetsu announced plans to introduced a new livery for its general-purpose limited express fleet, replacing the previous orange and navy blue livery with a white, gold, and yellow livery. Two-car set AT56 was the first set to receive the updated colour scheme, first bearing the new livery in July 2016.

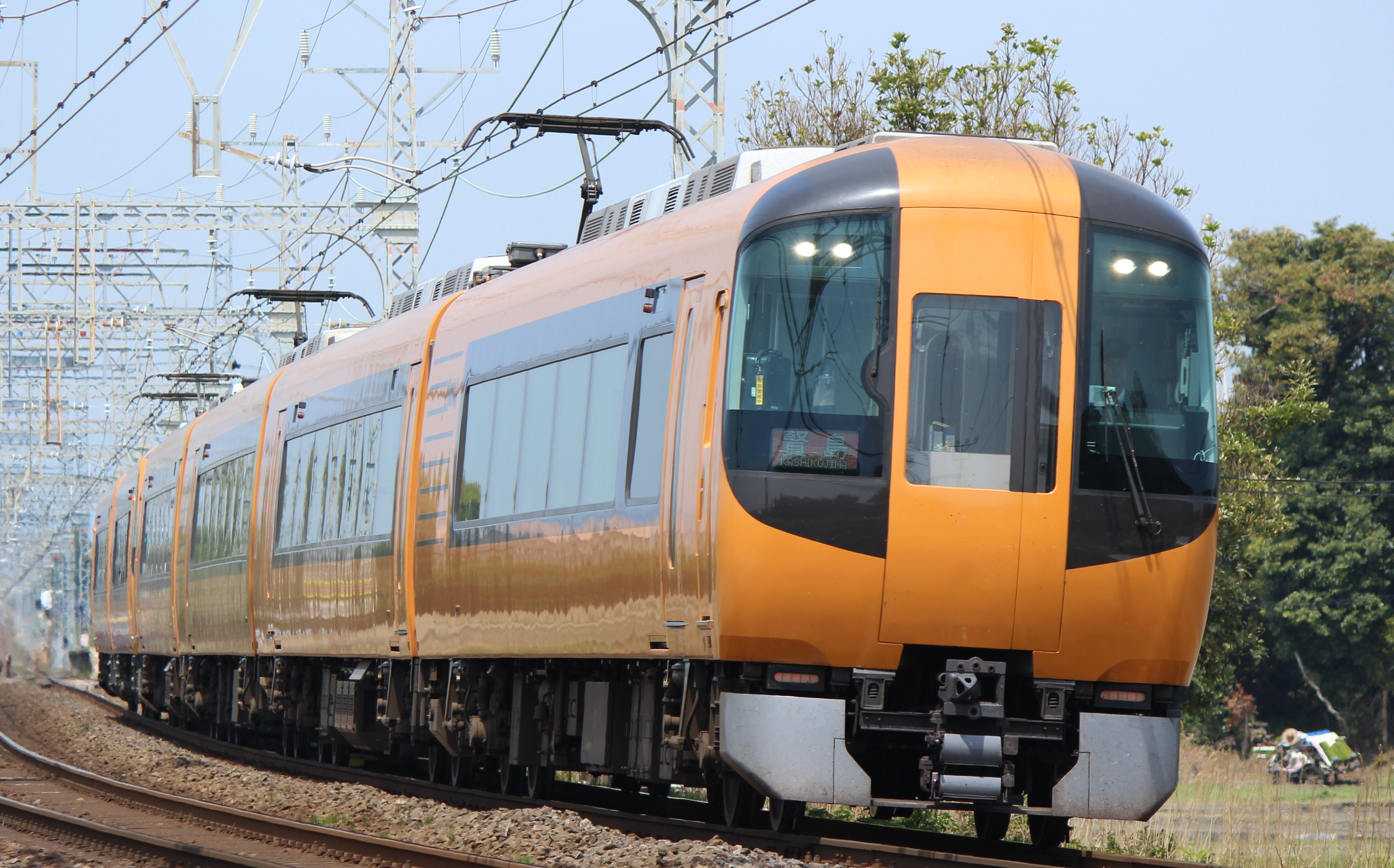
A 22600 series set in the original livery, April 2013

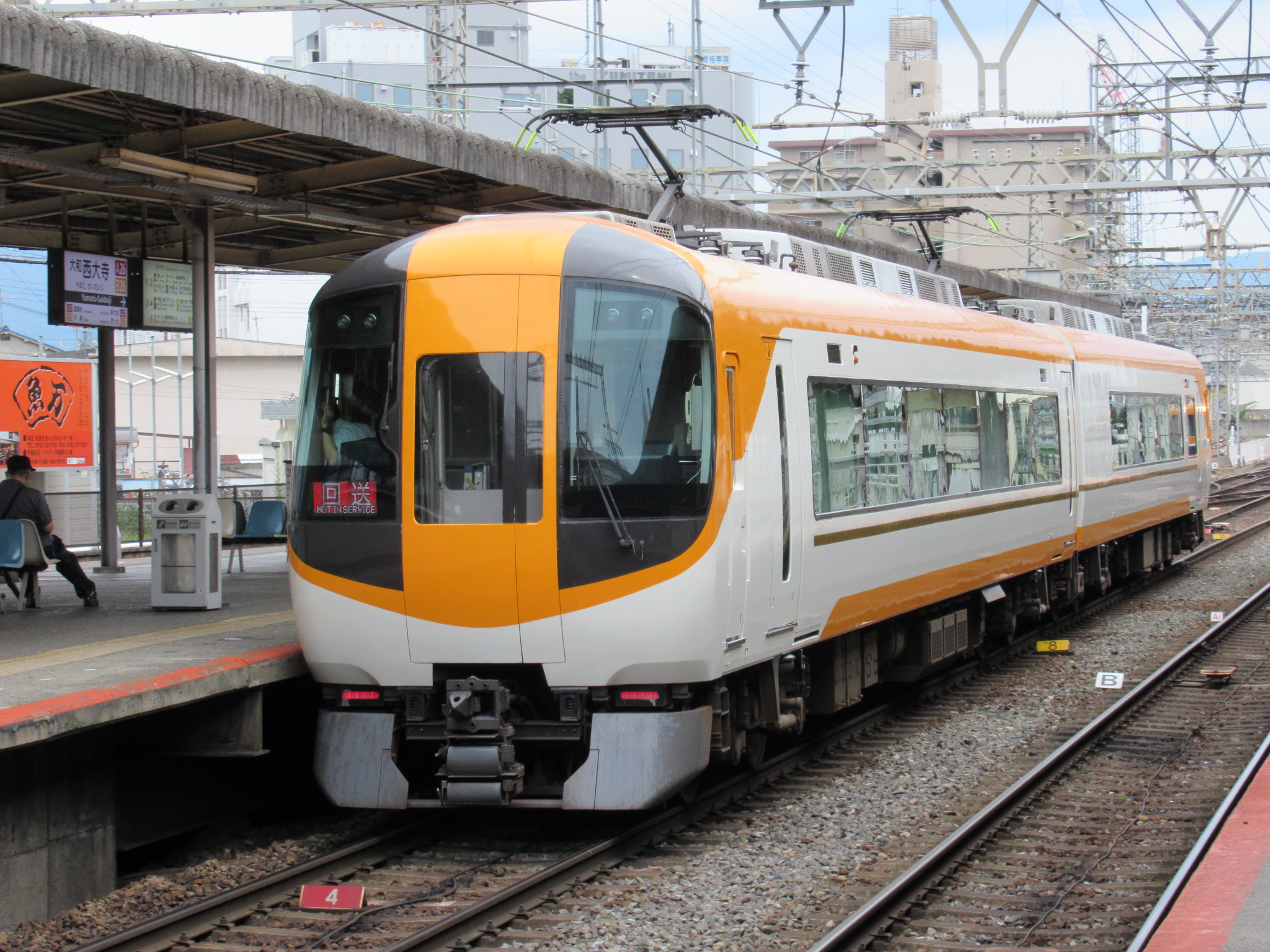
A 22600 series set in the updated livery, July 2017

== See also ==
- Kintetsu 16600 series, a narrow-gauge derivative of the 22600 series
