= Kintetsu 22000 series =

Japanese train type

Kintetsu 22000 series "ACE"
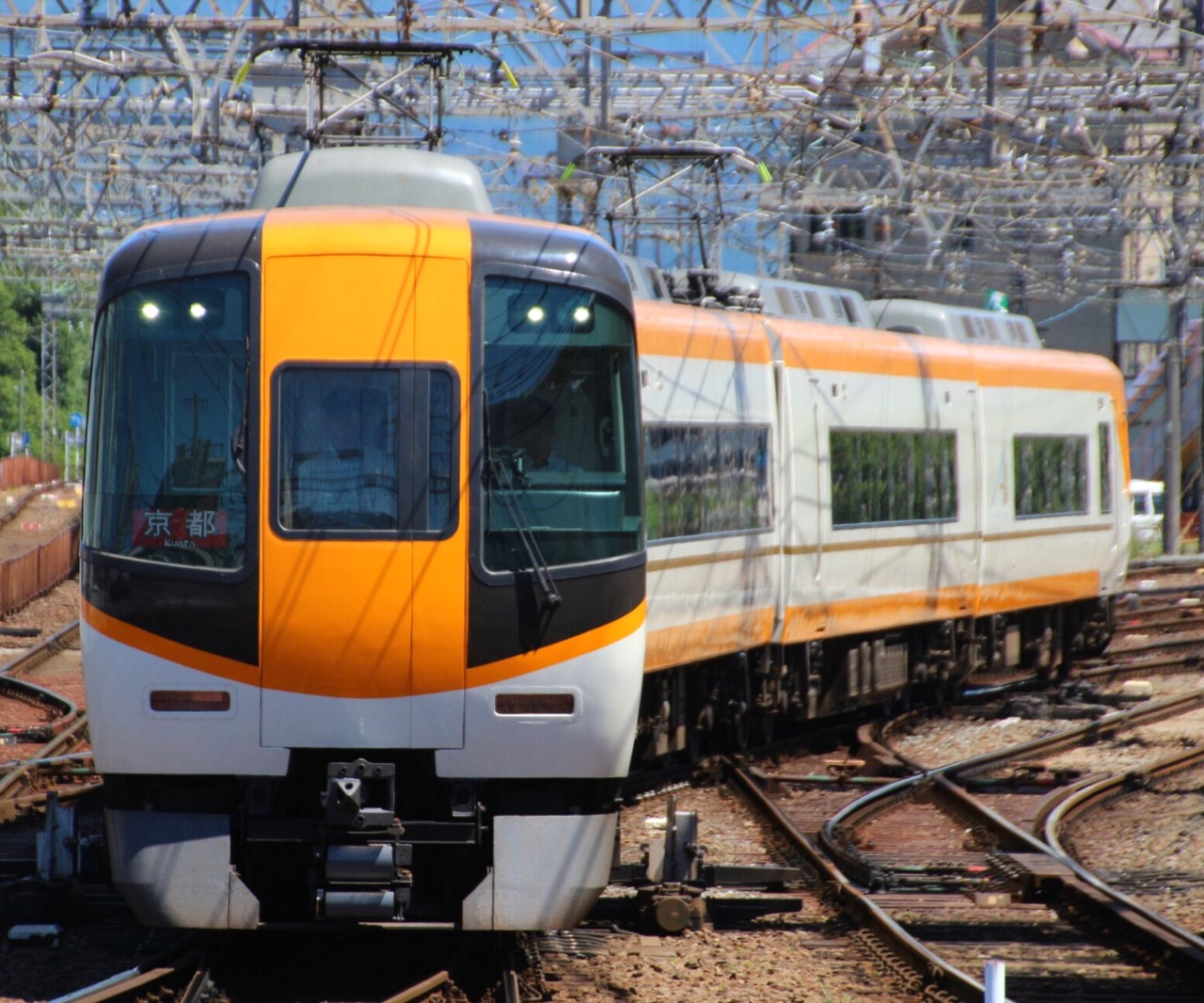
- A 4-car 22000 series EMU on the Kintetsu Kyoto Line
- In service: 1992–present
- Manufacturer: Kinki Sharyo
- Replaced: 11400 series
- Entered service: 19 March 1992
- Refurbished: 2015-
- Number built: 86 vehicles (28 sets)
- Number in service: 86 vehicles (28 sets)
- Formation: 2/4 cars per trainset
- Fleet numbers: AS03 – AS04, AS08 – AS09, AS13, AS21 – AS28, AL01 – AL02, AL05 – AL07, AL10 – AL12, AL14 – AL20
- Operators: Kintetsu Railway
- Depots: Saidaiji, Takayasu, Myojo, Tomiyoshi
- Lines served: Kintetsu Namba Line; Kintetsu Nara Line; Kintetsu Kyoto Line; Kintetsu Kashihara Line; Kintetsu Osaka Line; Kintetsu Nagoya Line; Kintetsu Yamada Line; Kintetsu Toba Line; Kintetsu Shima Line

Specifications
- Car body construction: Steel
- Car length: 20,800 mm (68 ft 3 in) (end cars); 20,500 mm (67 ft 3 in) (intermediate cars)
- Width: 2,800 mm (9 ft 2 in)
- Height: 4,150 mm (13 ft 7 in) (motor cars); 4,135 mm (13 ft 6.8 in) (trailers)
- Doors: plug doors
- Maximum speed: 130 km/h (80 mph)
- Traction system: Variable frequency (GTO)
- Power output: 135 kW per motor
- Acceleration: 2.5 km/(h⋅s) (1.6 mph/s)
- Deceleration: 4.0 km/(h⋅s) (2.5 mph/s)
- Electric system(s): 1,500 V DC, overhead line
- Current collection: Pantograph
- Bogies: KD304
- Safety system(s): ATS
- Multiple working: 12200, 12400, 22600, 30000
- Track gauge: 1,435 mm (4 ft 8 1/2 in)

The Kintetsu 22000 series "ACE" (近鉄22000系「ACE」) is a limited express electric multiple unit (EMU) train type operated by the private railway operator Kintetsu Railway since 1992.

== Formations ==
As of 1 April 2012, the fleet consists of 15 four-car sets and 13 two-car sets.

=== 4-car sets ===
The four-car sets are formed as shown below. All cars are motored.

Designation	Mc	M	M	Mc
Numbering	22100	22200	22300	22400
Weight (t)	44.0	41.0	43.0	42.0
Capacity	60	58	60	56

The 22100 and 22300 cars are each fitted with one scissors type pantograph.

=== 2-car sets ===
The two-car sets are formed as shown below. All cars are motored.

Designation	Mc	Mc
Numbering	22100	22400
Weight (t)	44.0	42.0
Capacity	60	56

The 22100 cars are each fitted with two scissors type pantographs.

== Bogies ==
All cars are mounted on motored bolsterless KD304 bogies with an axle spacing of 2,200 mm (87 in) and 860 mm (34 in) diameter wheels.

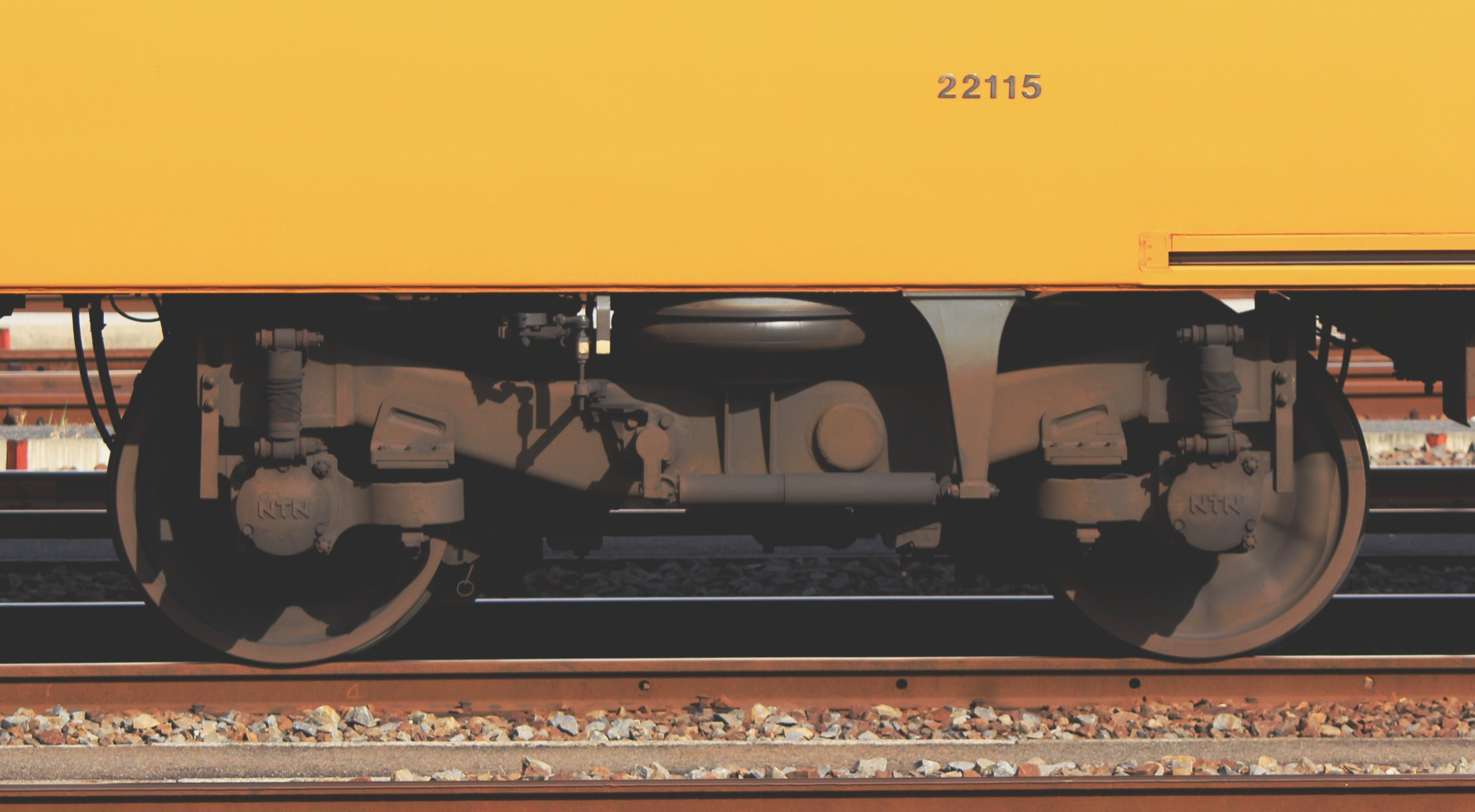
KD304 bogie

== Interior ==
Seating is arranged 2+2 abreast with a seat pitch of 1,000 mm (39 in).

== Refurbishment ==
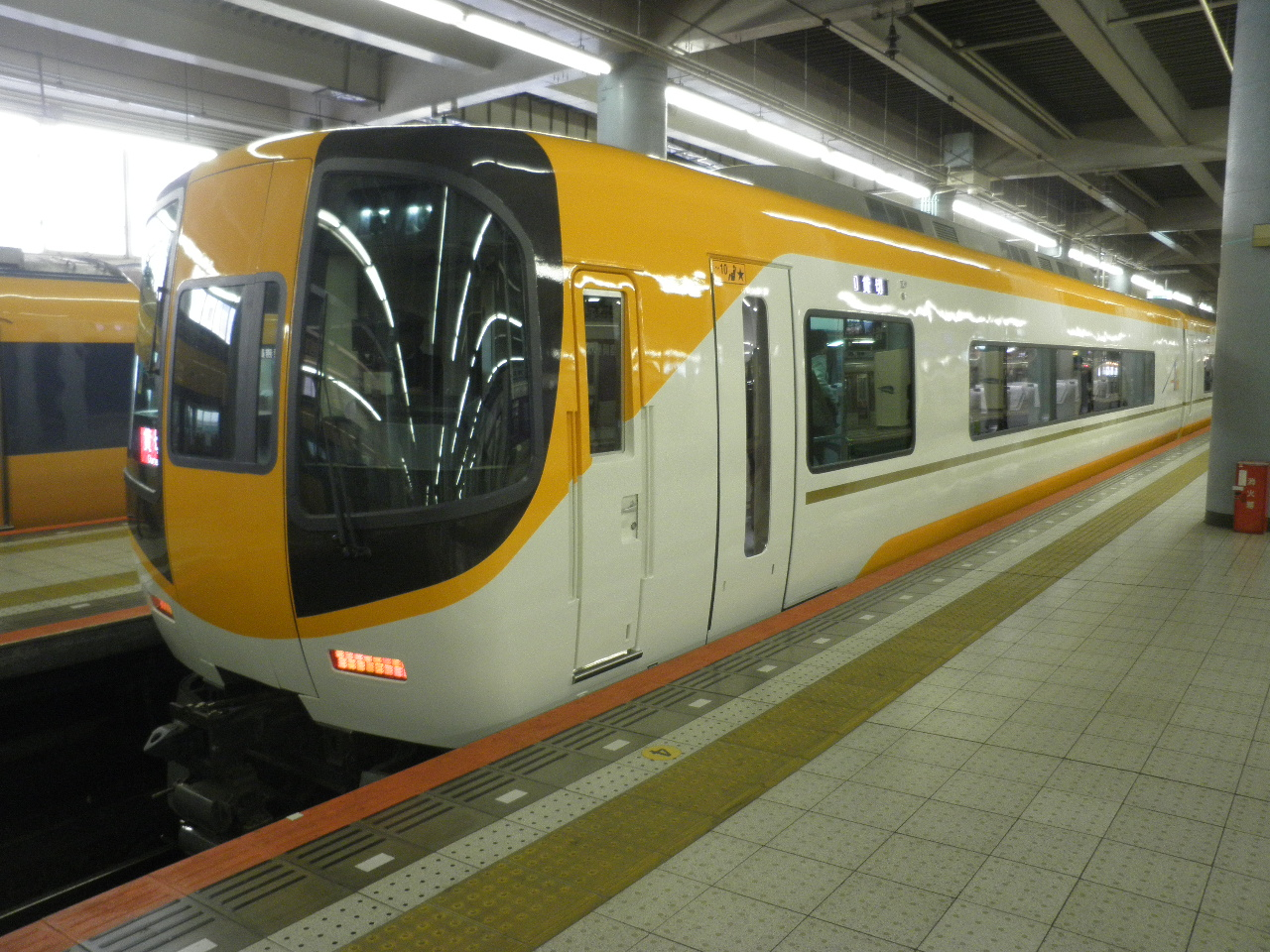
A refurbished set in December 2015

The entire fleet is scheduled to undergo a programme of refurbishment from 2015, with new interiors and a new yellow and white livery. The first trainset treated, AL10, was completed in November 2015 and returned to service on 13 December.
