= 22000 series =

22000 series may refer to:

- Kintetsu 22000 series EMU
- Nankai 22000 series EMU
