= Kintetsu 15400 series =

Japanese train type

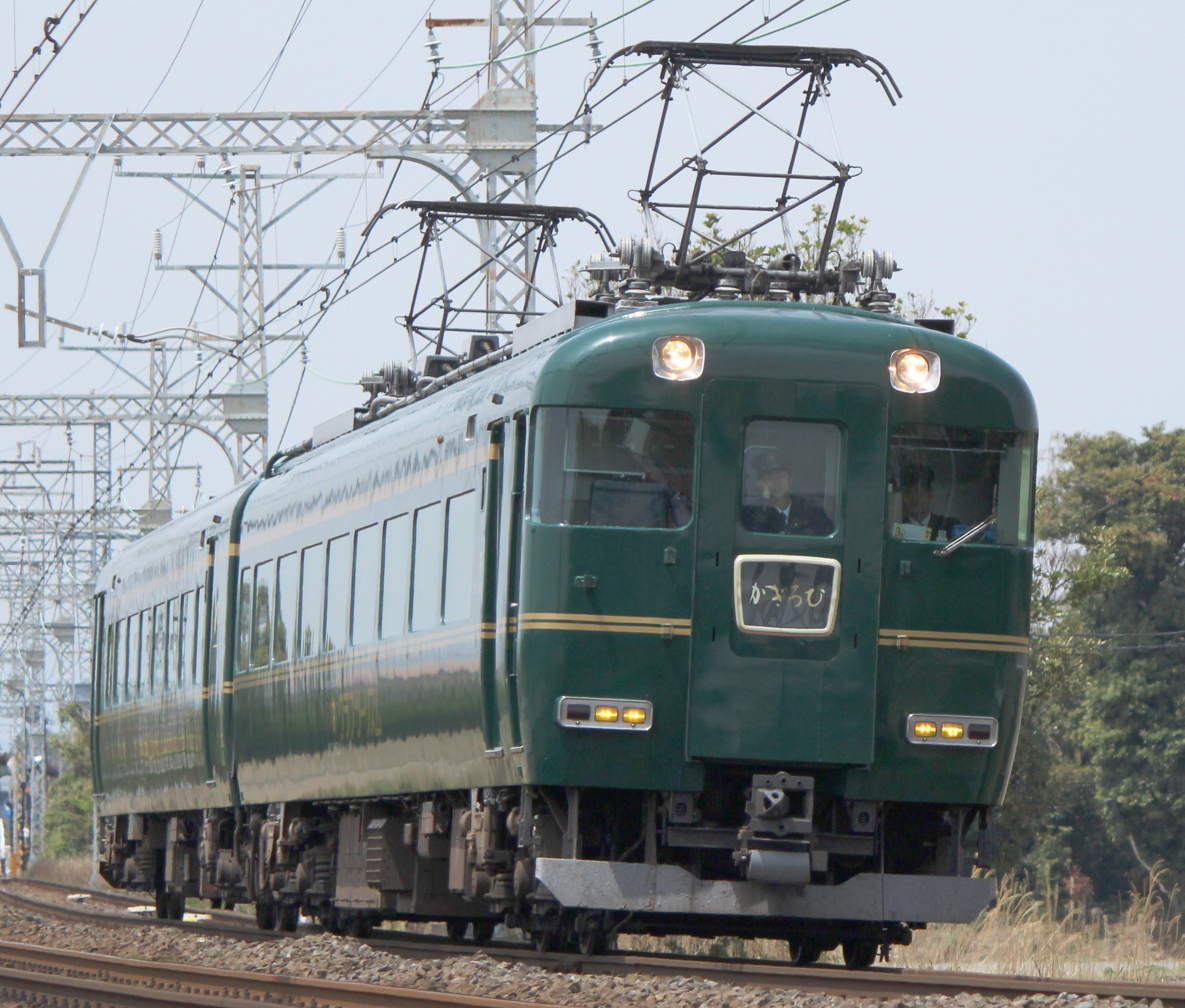
- 15400 series Kagirohi EMU, April 2013
- In service: December 2011–present
- Family name: Kagirohi
- Number built: 4 vehicles (2 sets)
- Formation: 2 cars per trainset
- Fleet numbers: PN51–PN52
- Capacity: 94
- Operators: Kintetsu Railway
- Depots: Tomiyoshi

Specifications
- Car length: 20,500 mm (67 ft 3 in)
- Width: 2,800 mm (9 ft 2 in)
- Height: 4,150 mm (13 ft 7 in)
- Maximum speed: 120 km/h (75 mph)
- Traction system: Resistor control
- Acceleration: 2.5 km/(h⋅s) (1.6 mph/s)
- Deceleration: 4.0 km/(h⋅s) (2.5 mph/s)
- Electric system(s): 1,500 V DC
- Current collection: Overhead line
- Track gauge: 1,435 mm (4 ft 8 1/2 in)

The Kintetsu 15400 series (近鉄15400系) is an electric multiple unit (EMU) train type in Japan rebuilt from two former Kintetsu 12200 series EMUs in 2011 for use on tourist charter services in the Osaka and Nagoya areas under the name "Kagirohi" (かぎろひ) operated by the Kintetsu Corporation group company Club Tourism since 23 December 2011.

== Design ==
Two former Kintetsu 12200 series 2-car EMU sets (Mo 12241 + Ku 12341 and Mo 12242 + Ku 12342) were rebuilt in 2011 to become new 15400 series sets. These are repainted in a new dark green livery with gold lining.

== Formation ==
The two 2-car sets are formed as follows, with the Mo 15400 car at the Osaka end.

Designation	Mc	Tc
Numbering	Mo 15400	Ku 15300
Weight (t)	39.3	34.7
Seating capacity	48	46

The Mc cars are fitted with two PT42 lozenge-type pantographs.

== Interior ==
Passenger accommodation consists of pairs of rotating, reclining seats, arranged 2+2 abreast with a seat pitch of 980 mm (39 in). The rebuilt trains feature carpeted floors and new toilets with heated seats.

== History ==
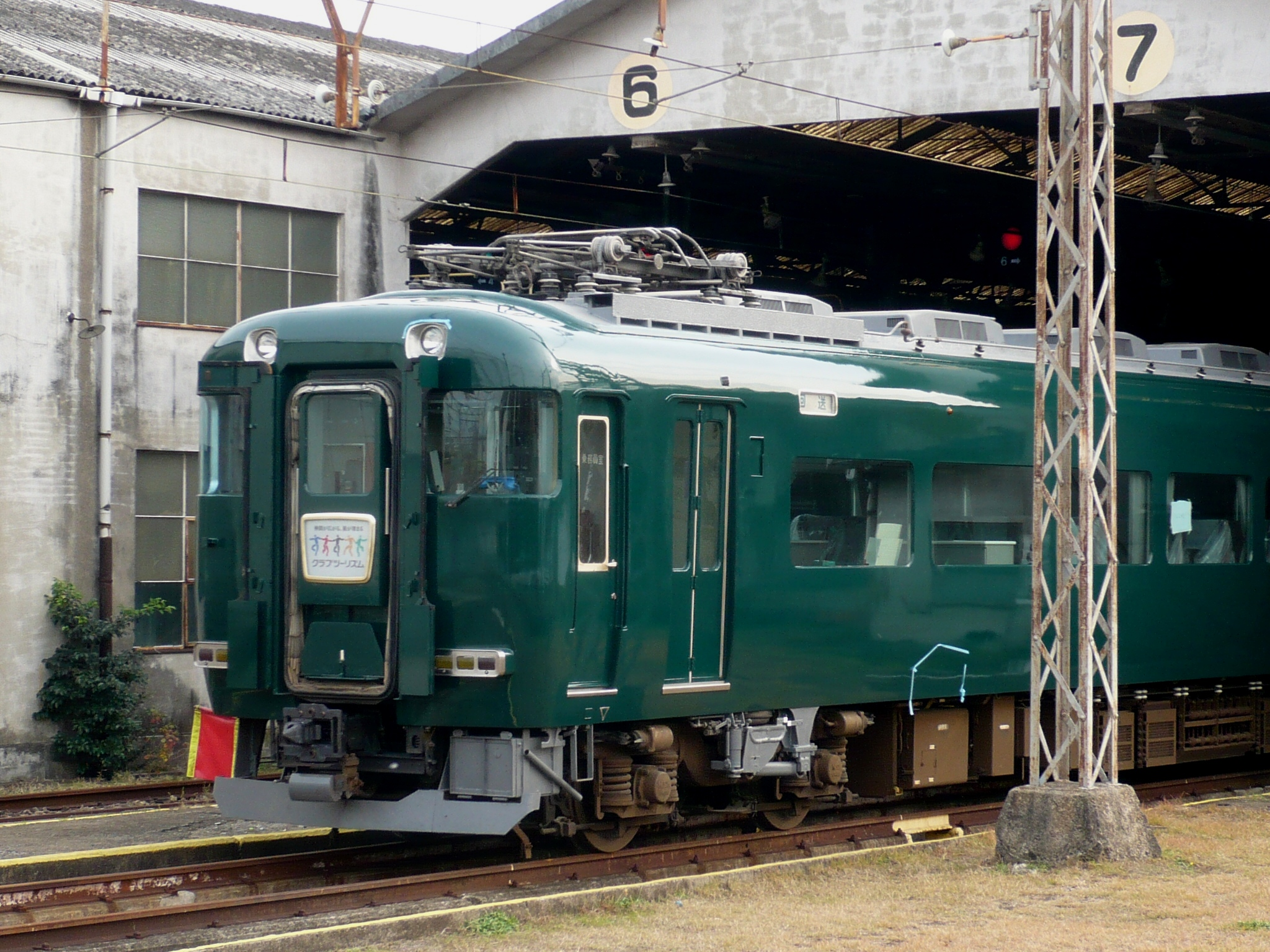
15400 series set undergoing repainting, November 2011

The 15400 series train was officially unveiled in a ceremony at Ōsaka Uehommachi Station on 15 December 2011, at which the train's new name, "Kagirohi", was also announced.

The train is scheduled to enter revenue service from 23 December 2011.

== See also ==
- Joyful Train, the generic name for excursion train sets operated by the JR Group
