= Kintetsu 19200 series =

Japanese electric multiple unit train type

Kintetsu 19200 series Aoniyoshi
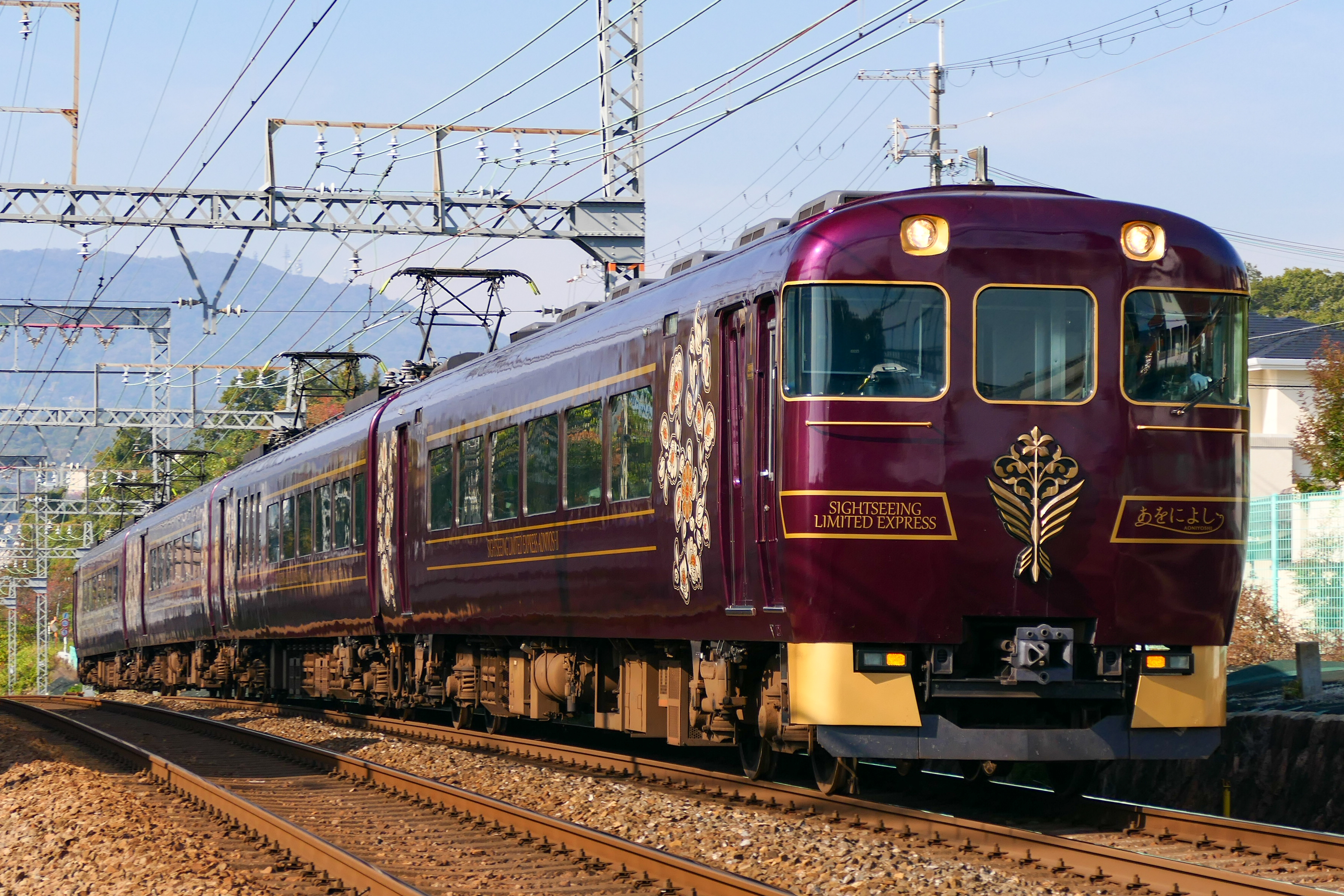
- The 19200 series set in November 2023
- In service: 2022–present
- Constructed: December 1974 (fact that conversion in 2022)
- Entered service: 29 April 2022
- Number built: 4 vehicles (1 set) — conversion from 12200series
- Number in service: 4 vehicles (1 set)
- Formation: 4 cars per trainset
- Fleet numbers: SA01
- Capacity: 84
- Operator: Kintetsu Railway

Specifications
- Electric systems: 1,500 V DC overhead line
- Current collection: Pantograph
- Track gauge: 1,435 mm (4 ft 8 1/2 in)

The Kintetsu 19200 series (近鉄19200系, Kintetsu 19200-kei), branded Aoniyoshi (あをによし), is a limited express sightseeing electric multiple unit (EMU) train type operated by the private railway operator Kintetsu Railway in Japan since 2022. The set was converted from 12200 series set NS56.

== Operations ==
The 19200 series set is normally used from Friday to Wednesday each week and on certain Thursdays. One return service between Ōsaka Namba and Kyōto via Kintetsu Nara and two return services between Kintetsu Nara and Kyōto operate each day. On 12 October 2022, Kintetsu Railway announced that a third return service between Kintetsu Nara and Kyōto would be added for each operating day from the start of the revised timetable on 17 December of that year.

== Design ==
During the conversion period, the windows at the seating areas of car 2 were redesigned to be 1.2 metres tall and 2 metres long, and the passenger doors of car 3 were replaced with sliding doors. The set received a metallic purple livery with gold lining and side decorations inspired by the Shōsōin treasures.

== Formation ==
The set is formed as shown below.

Car No.	4	3	2	1
Designation	Mc	T	M	Tc
Numbering	19201	19351	19251	19301
Original numbering	12256	12156	12056	12356
Seating capacity	28	20	12	24
Facilities	Library	Toilets, wheelchair space	Sales counter	Western-style toilet

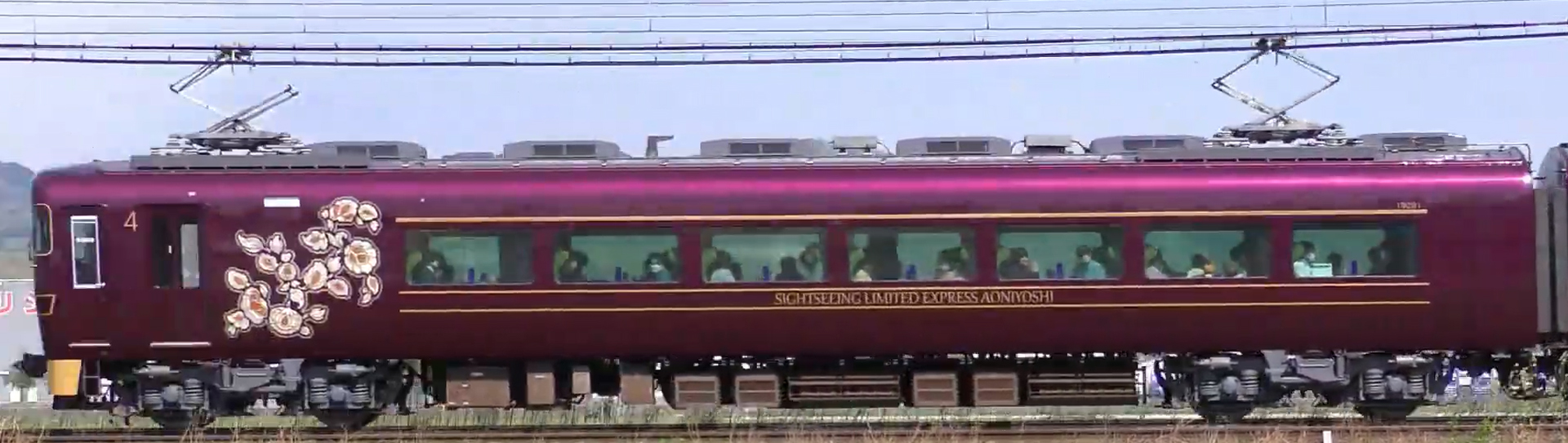
Car 4

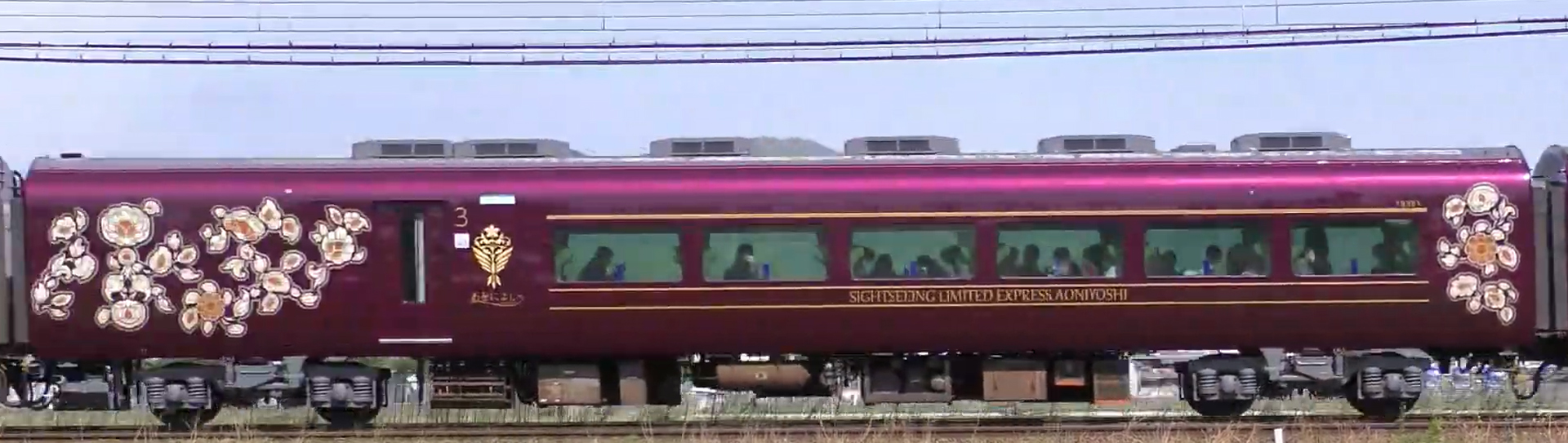
Car 3

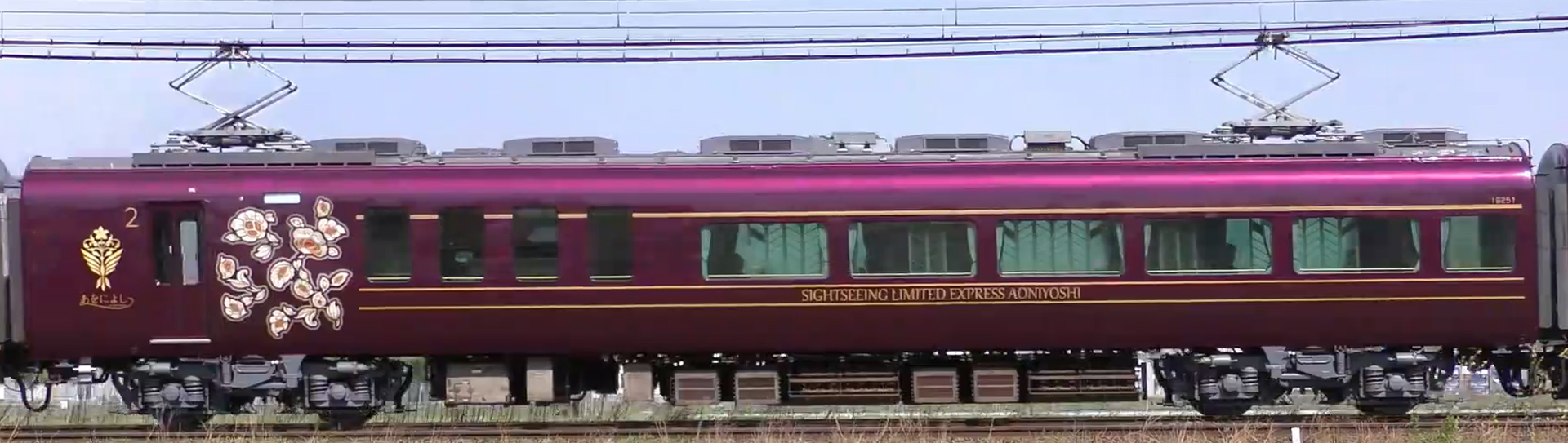
Car 2

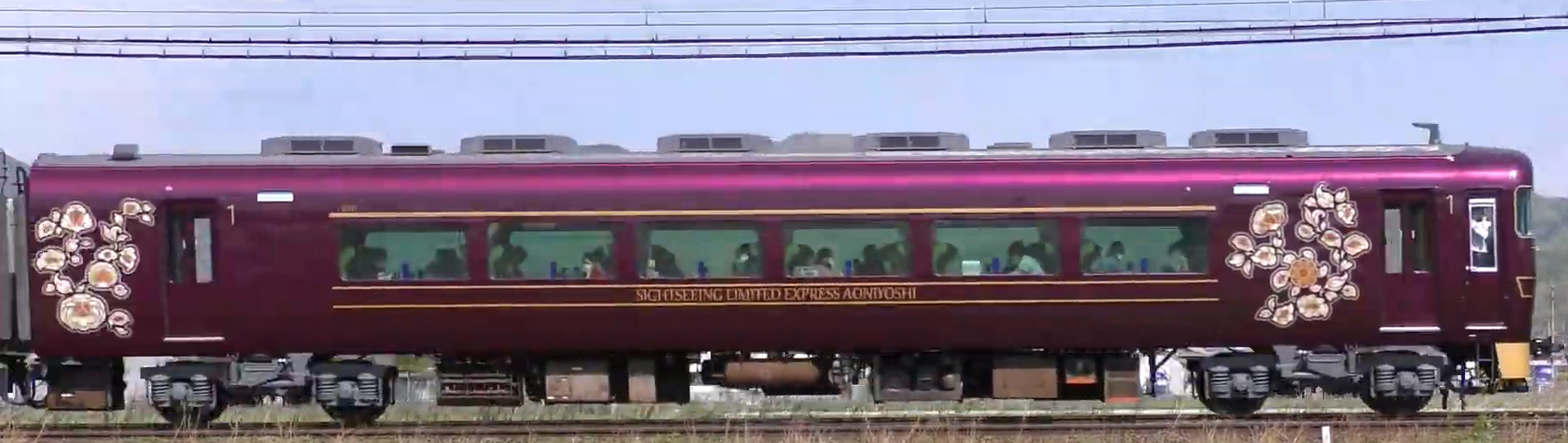
Car 1

== Interior ==
Cars 1, 3 and 4 have a 1+1 seating layout with the seats on one side arranged diagonally towards the windows and the seats on the other side arranged in a transverse layout. Car 2 has semi-private compartments with adjustable seats that can accommodate groups of three or four passengers each.

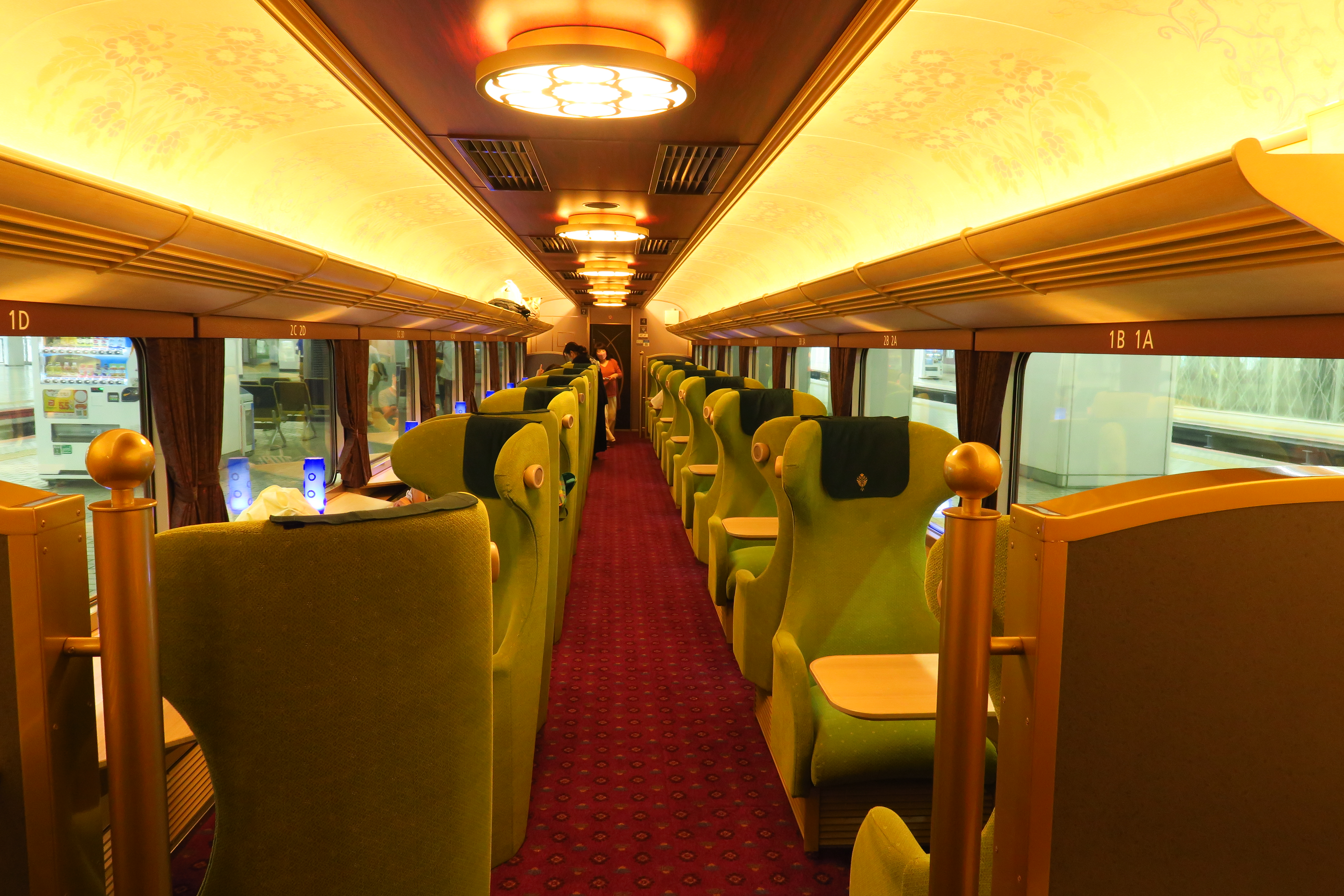
Interior of car 4 in September 2022

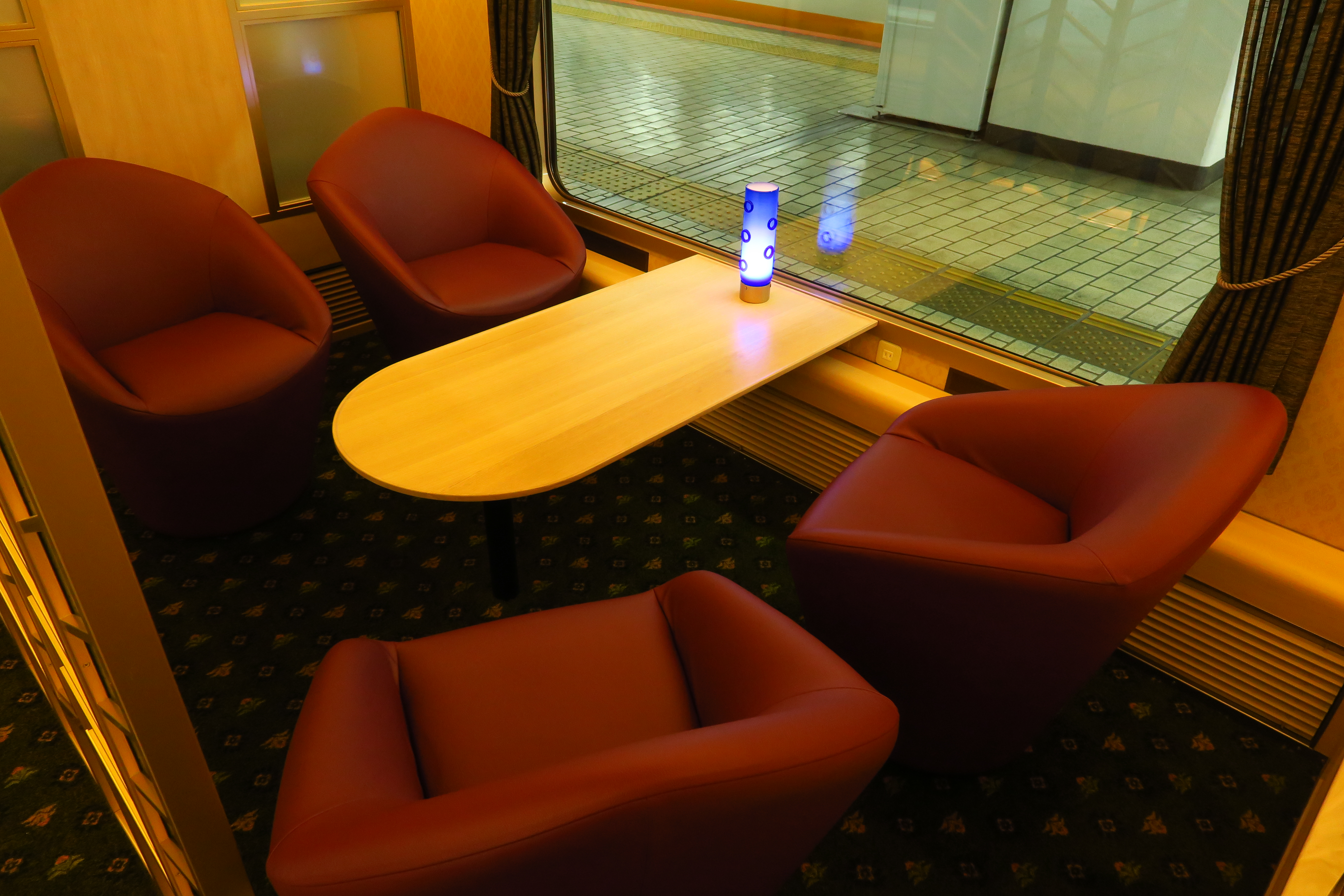
Semi-private compartment in car 2 in September 2022

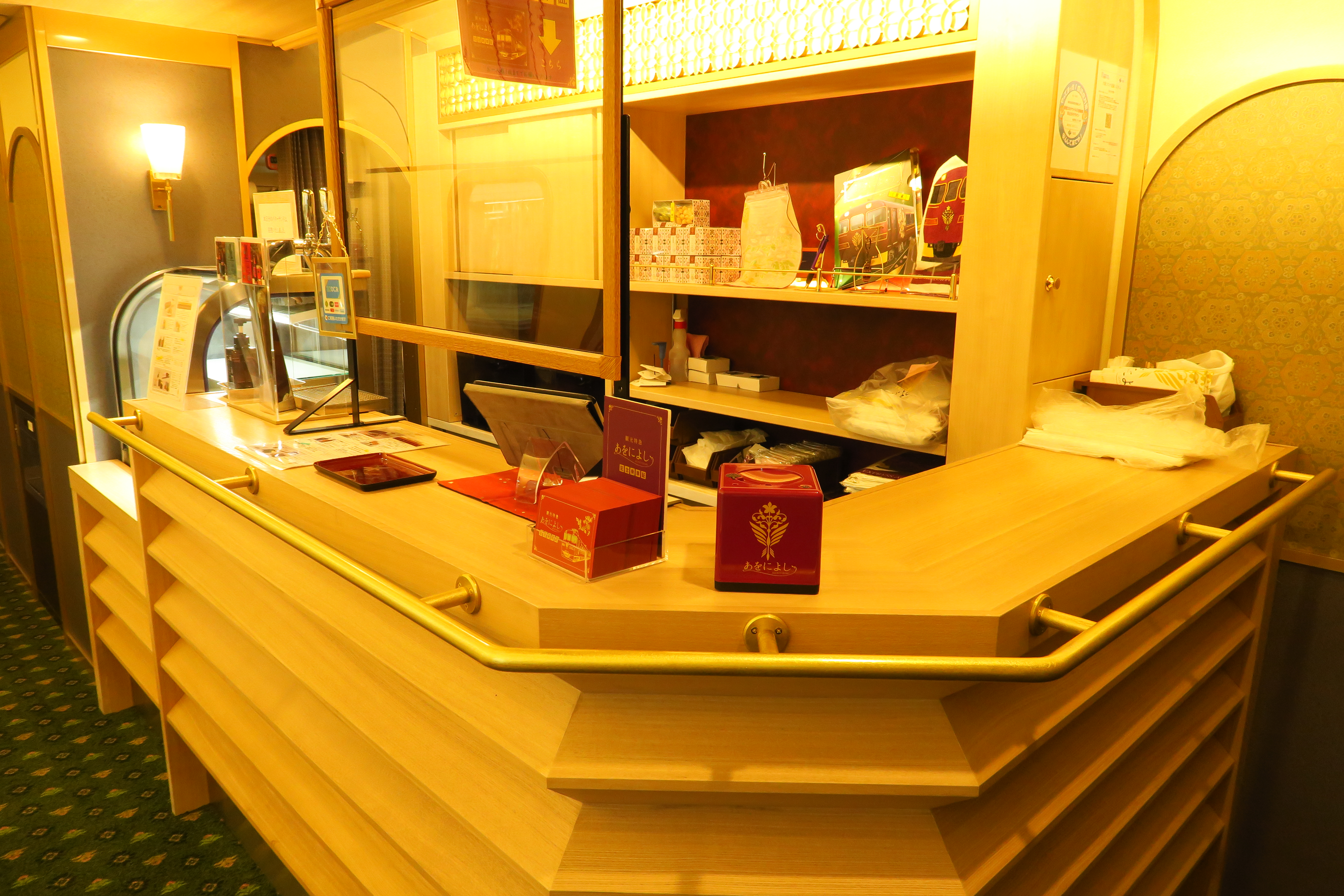
In-car sales counter in car 2 in September 2022

== History ==
Details of the converted limited express sightseeing train type were first officially announced in October 2021. The total cost of the refurbishment was approximately 330 million yen.

The 19200 series set entered service on 29 April 2022 with a departure ceremony at Ōsaka Namba Station and another ceremony at Kintetsu Nara Station.
