= Kintetsu 30000 series =

Japanese electric multiple unit train type

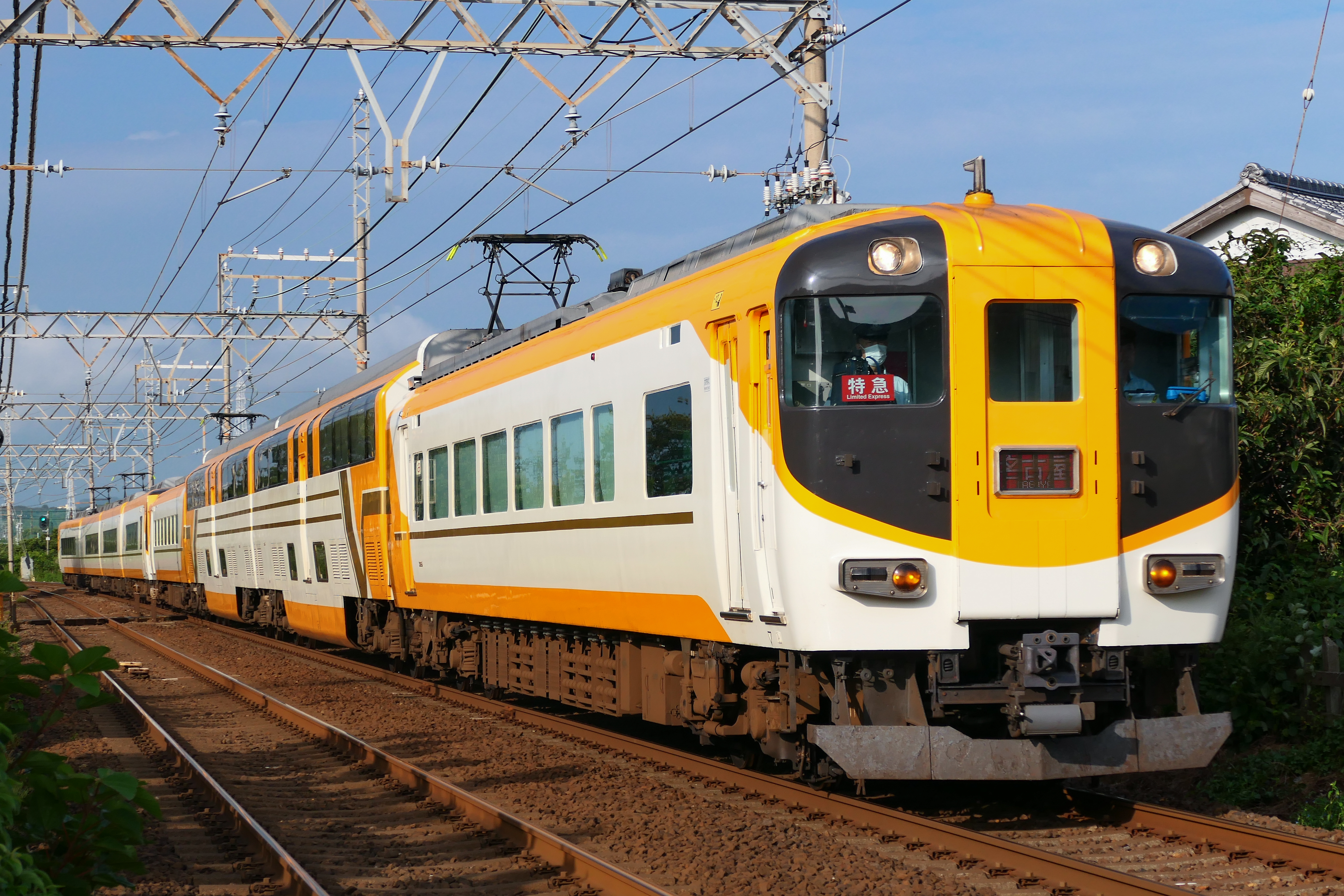
- A 30000 series set leading an eight-car consist in 2023
- In service: 1978–present
- Manufacturer: Kinki Sharyo
- Family name: Vista Car III (Original); Vista EX (Post-refurbishment)
- Replaced: 10100 series
- Constructed: 1978–1985
- Entered service: December 1978
- Refurbished: 1996–2000, 2010–2012
- Number built: 60 vehicles (15 sets)
- Number in service: 60 vehicles (15 sets)
- Formation: 4 cars per trainset
- Fleet numbers: V01-V15
- Operator: Kintetsu Railway

Specifications
- Car body construction: Steel
- Maximum speed: 120 km/h (75 mph)
- Traction system: Resistor control
- Traction motors: Mitsubishi Electric MB-3127-A motor
- Acceleration: 2.5 km/(h⋅s) (1.6 mph/s)
- Electric systems: 1,500 V DC overhead line
- Current collection: Pantograph
- Bogies: KD-83 (motored), KD-83A (trailer)
- Safety system: Kintetsu ATS
- Track gauge: 1,435 mm (4 ft 8 1/2 in)

Notes/references
- This train won the 22nd Blue Ribbon Award in 1979.

The Kintetsu 30000 series (近鉄30000系, Kintetsu 30000-kei) is a limited express electric multiple unit (EMU) train type operated by Kintetsu Railway since 1978.

== Design ==
The 30000 series sets were built as four-car sets with the two intermediate cars being bilevel cars. The end cars are based on the 12400 series trains which entered service from 1977.

== Operations ==
As of 2025, 15 four-car sets are in service. Some sets operate in multiple with other four- or two-car general-use limited express train types and two 30000 series sets occasionally couple together in revenue service.

== Formations ==
Sets are formed as shown below.

Designation	Mc1	T1	T2	Mc2
Numbering	30200	30100	30150	30250

== Interior ==
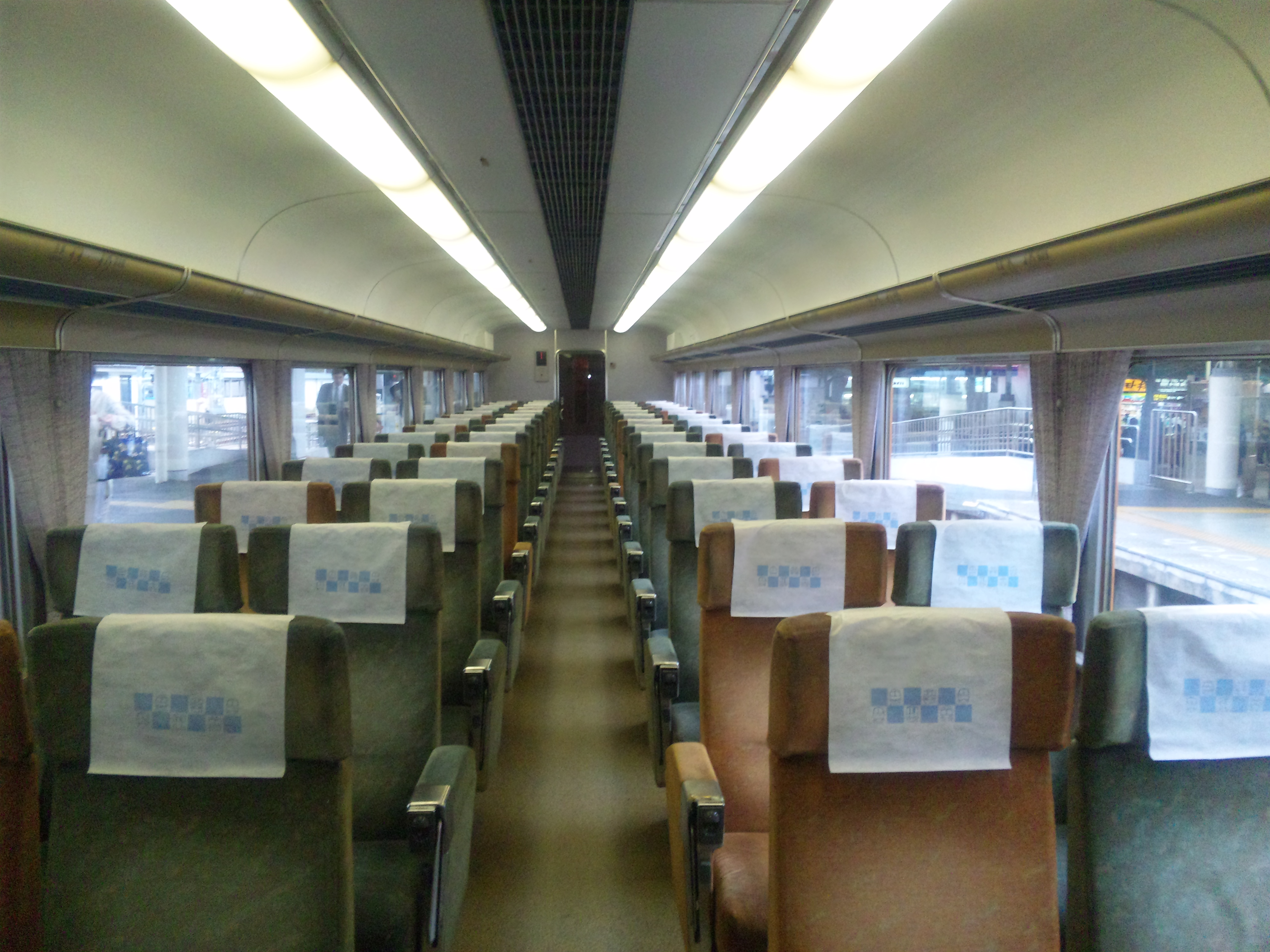
Interior view of a refurbished end car in April 2010

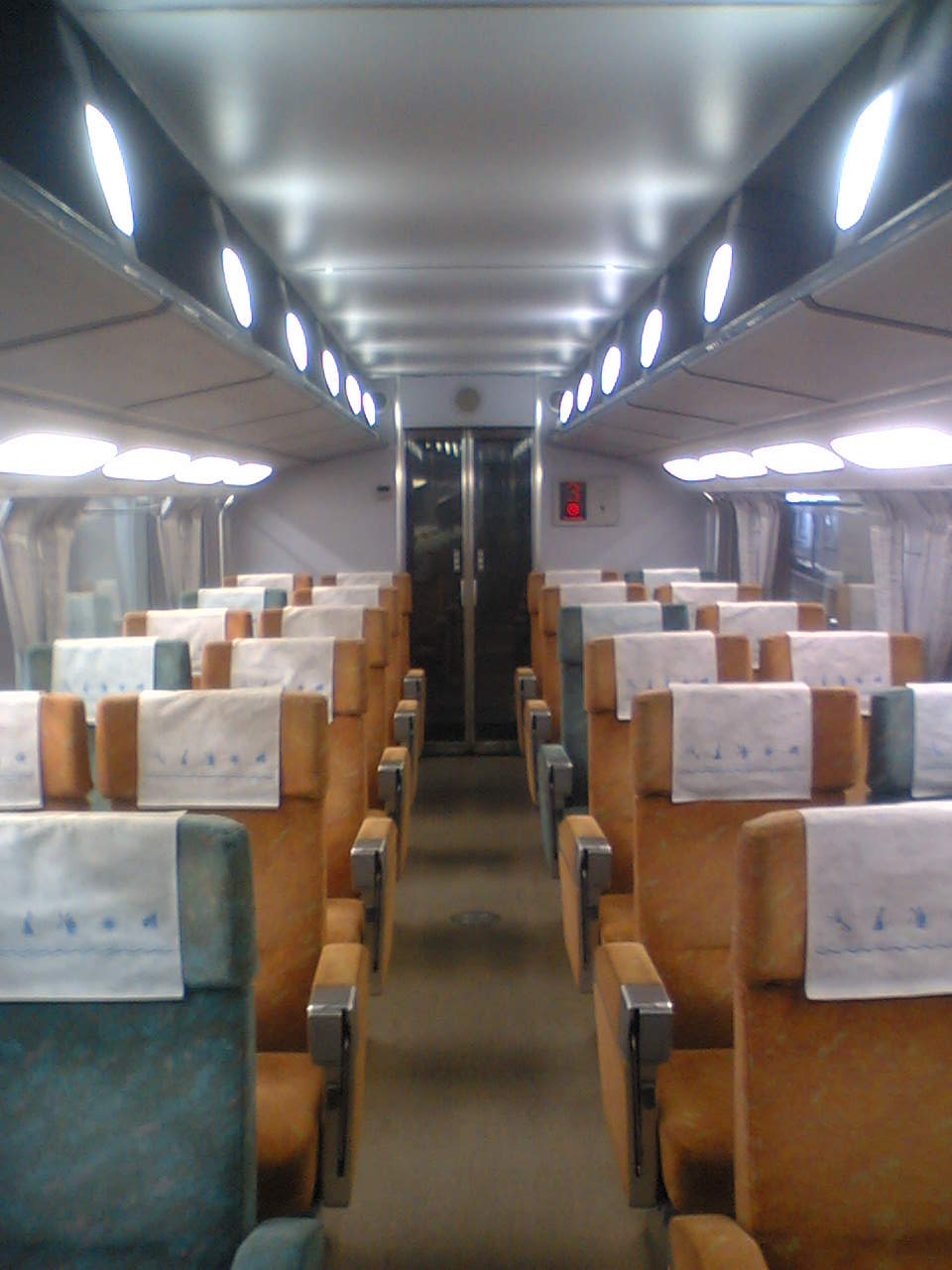
Upper deck seating of a refurbished bilevel car in April 2007

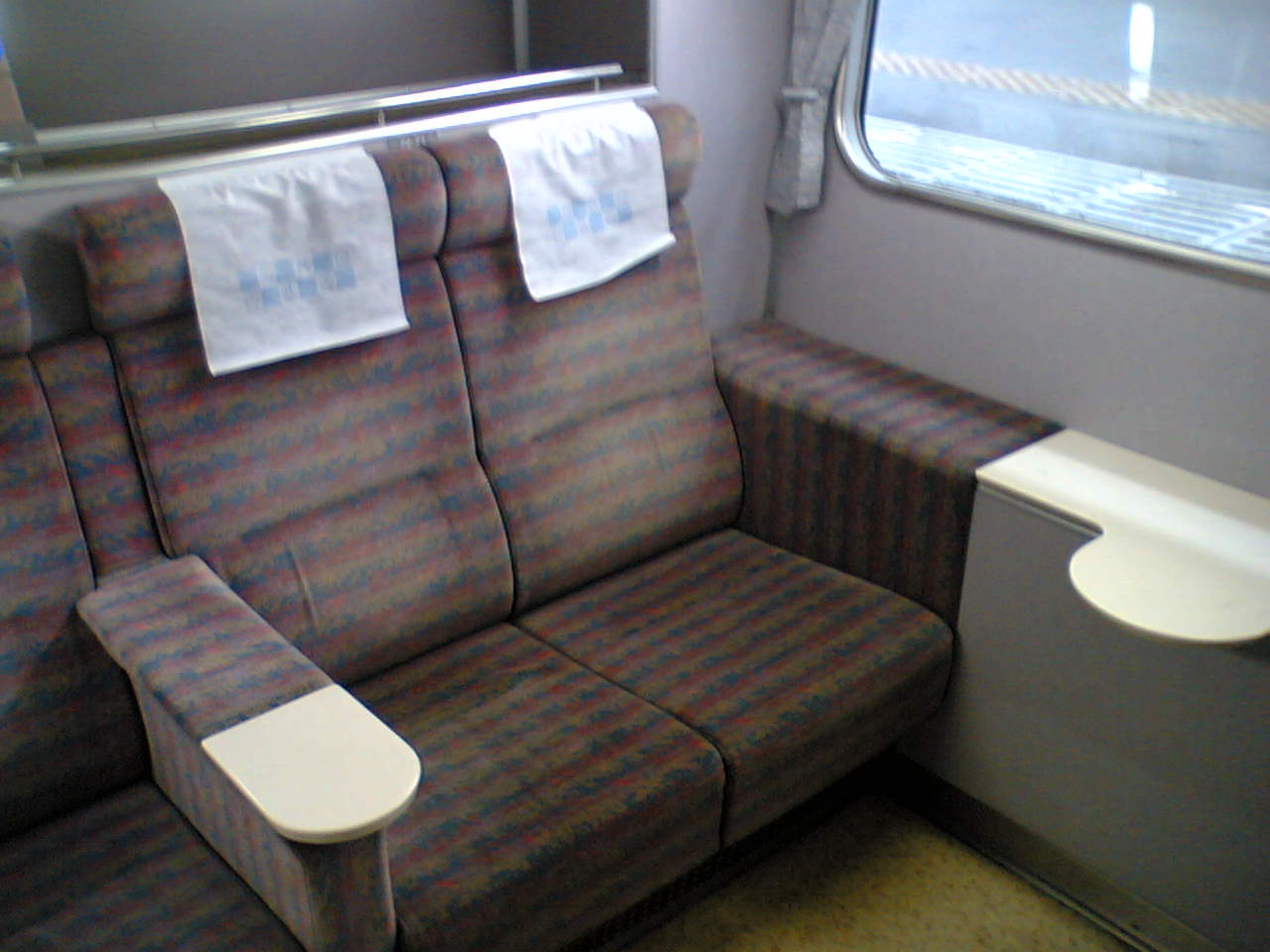
Lower deck seating of a refurbished bilevel car in July 2007

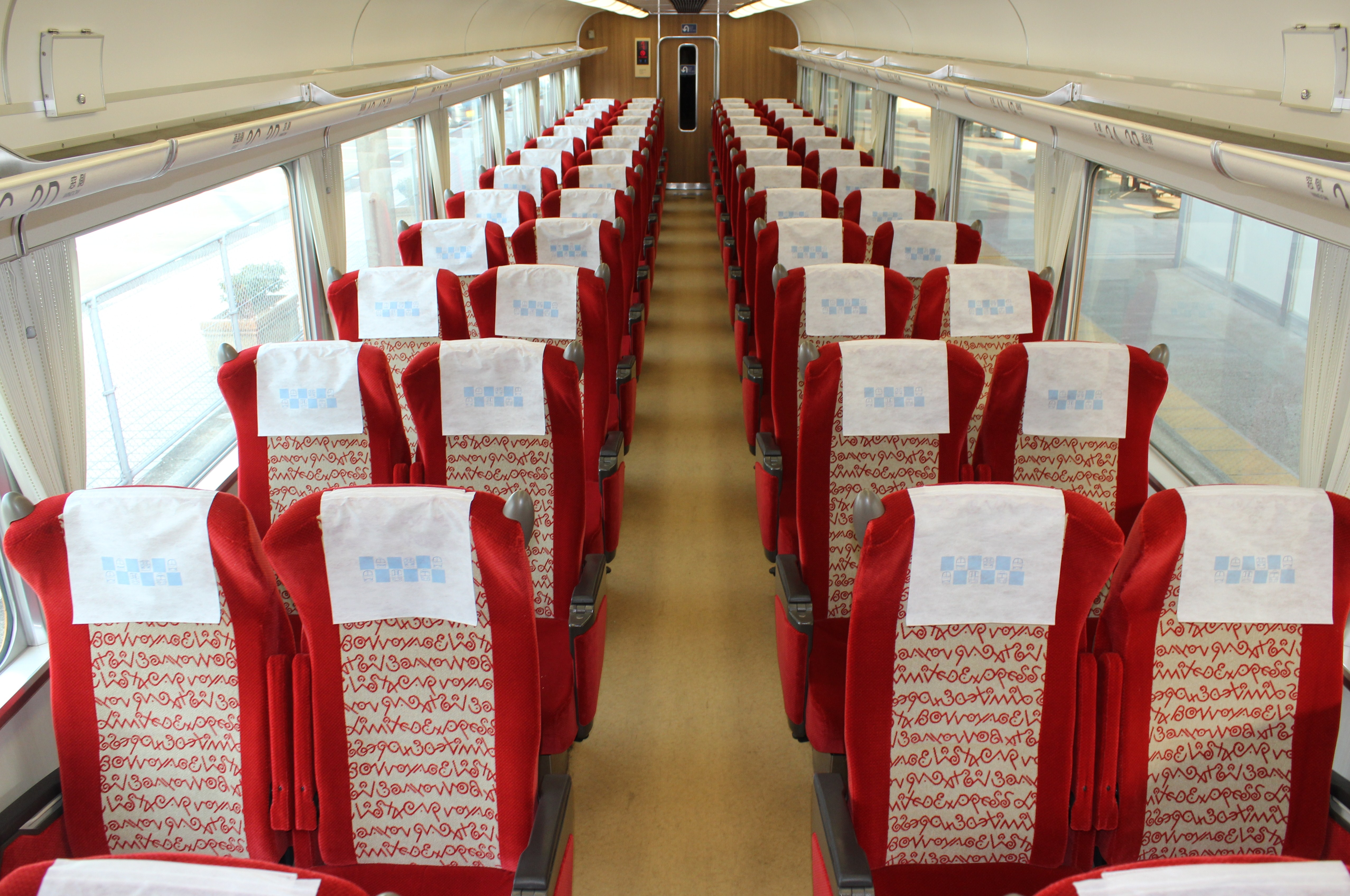
Interior view of a twice-refurbished end car in April 2013

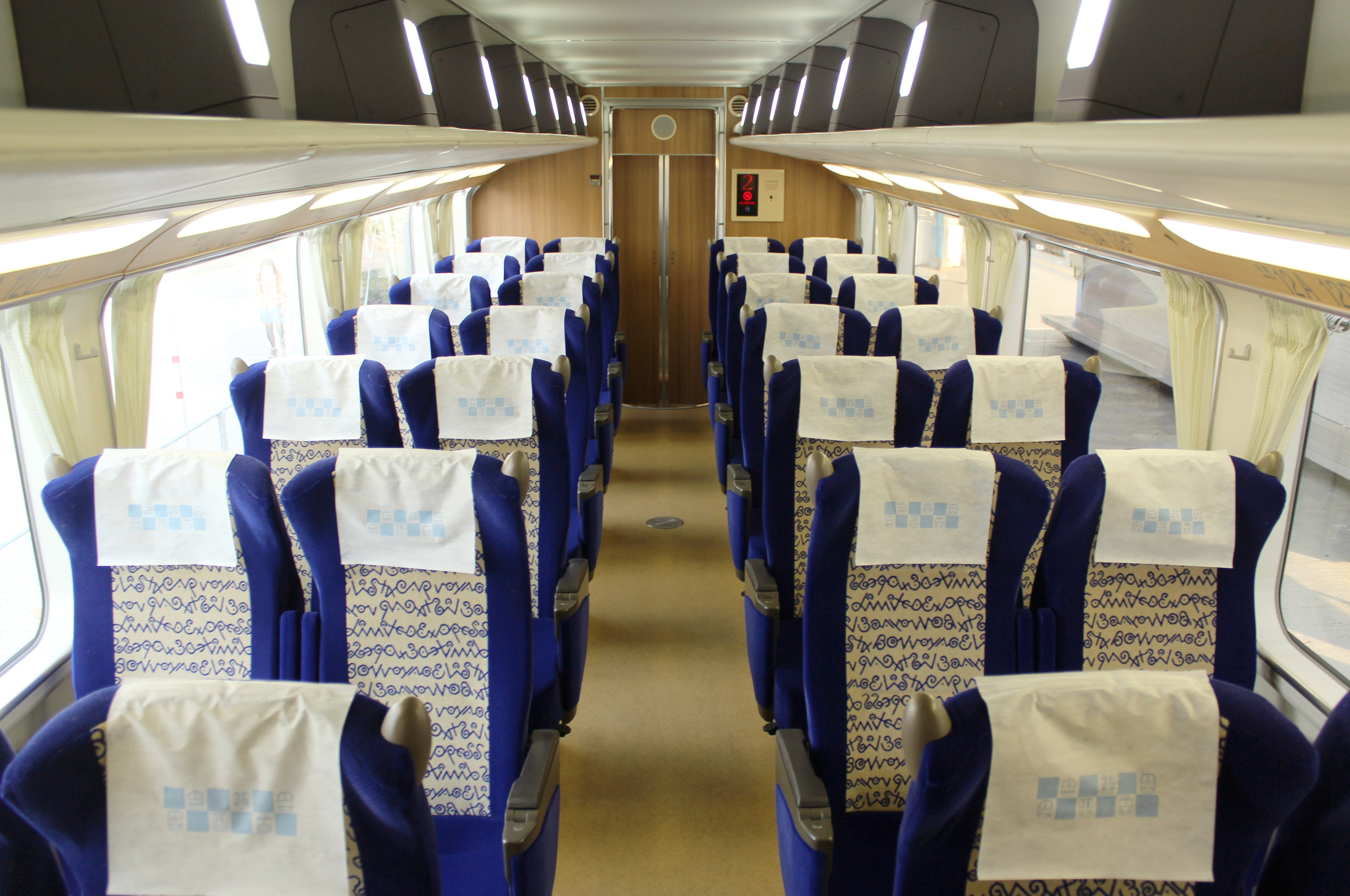
Upper deck seating of a twice-refurbished bilevel car in April 2013

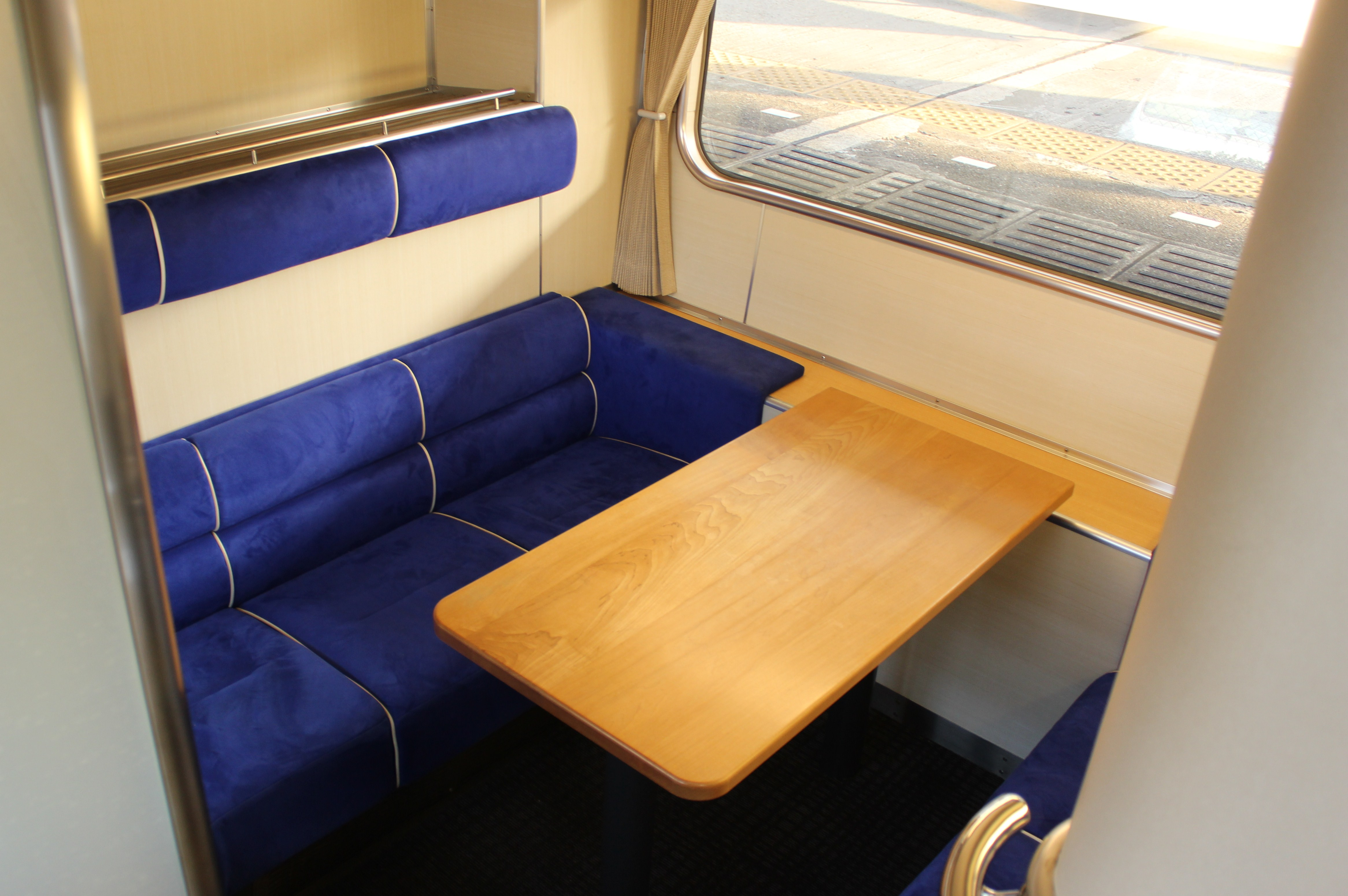
Compartment seating of a twice-refurbished bilevel car in April 2013

== History ==
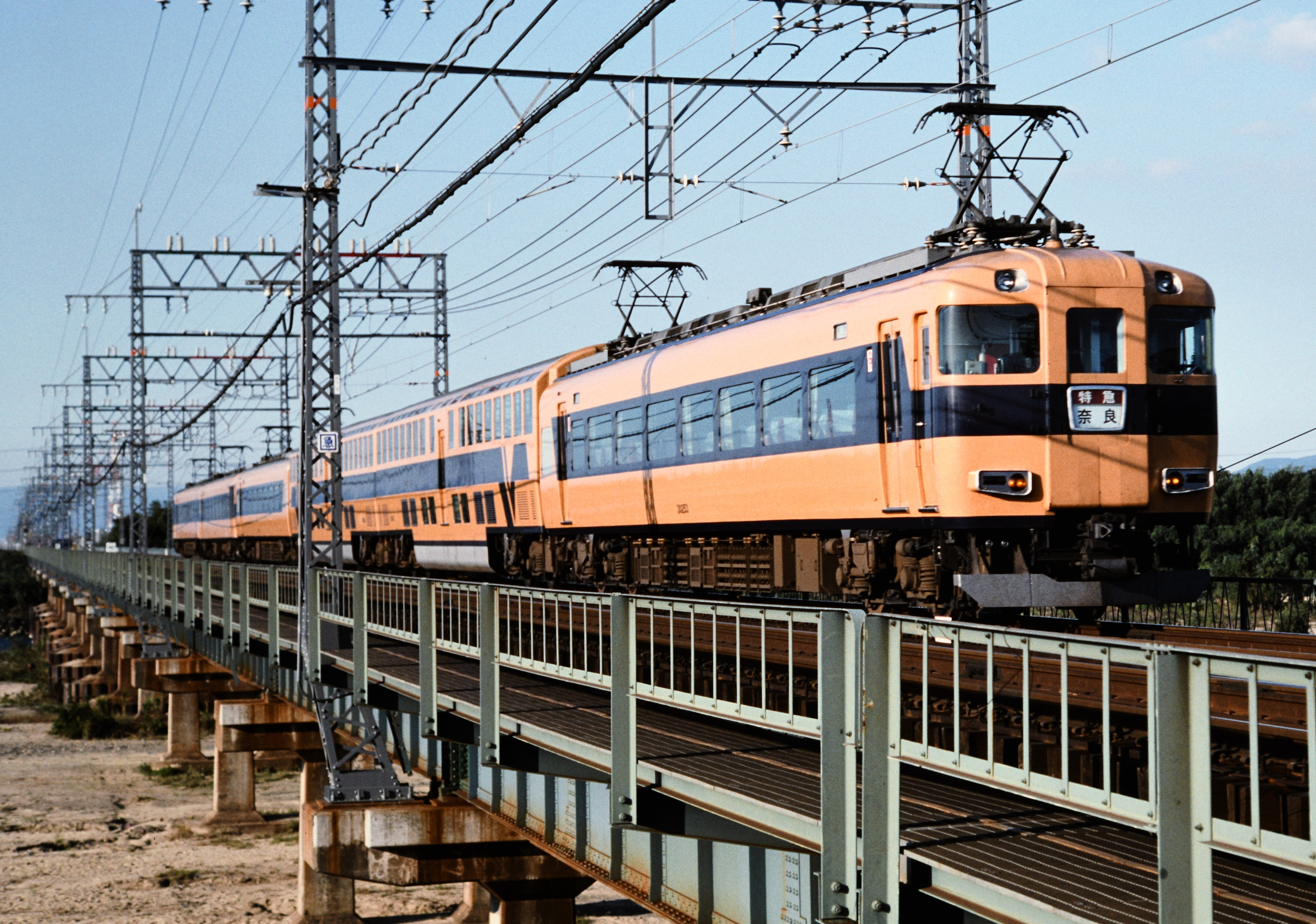
A 30000 series set in original style in 1990

The first set was delivered from the Kinki Sharyo factory in November 1978. The 30000 series fleet entered service from December of that year. The train type was the recipient of the Blue Ribbon Award in 1979.

In 1988, the fleet underwent modifications to be capable of operating at a maximum speed of 120 km/h (75 mph).

On 12 November 2015, Kintetsu announced that its general-use limited express trains would receive a new white, gold, and yellow livery. The first set to be repainted, V09, returned to service in July 2016.

=== Refurbishment ===
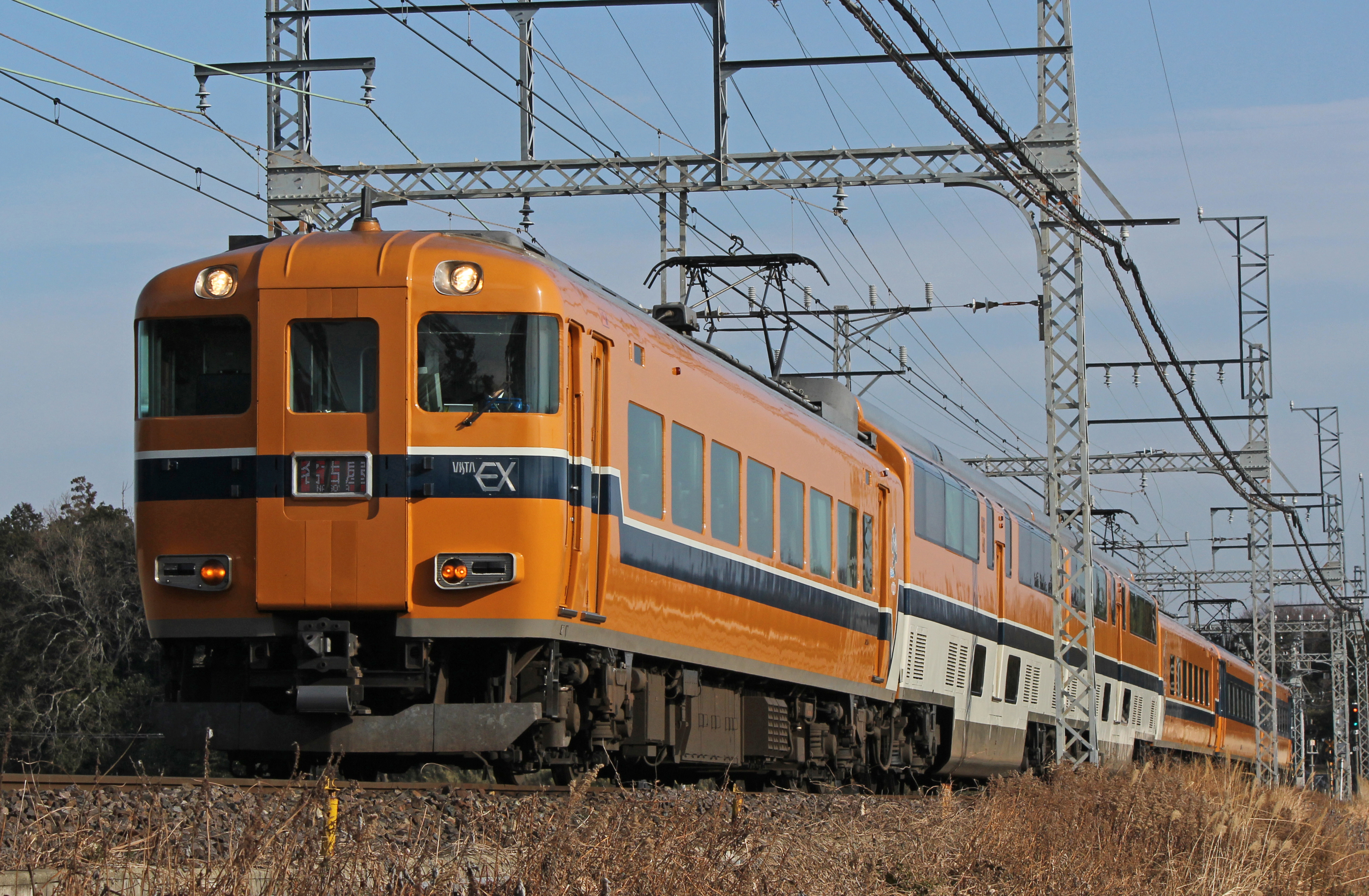
A refurbished 30000 series set in 2014

Since 1996, the fleet underwent a programme of refurbishment. The upper deck of the bilevel cars was rebuilt with continuous curved windows. Following the refurbishment, the 30000 series trains are nicknamed "Vista EX".

From 2010, the entire fleet underwent another programme of refurbishment which included converting the lower deck seating areas of the bilevel cars to compartment seating similar to those in yacht cabins.
