= Kintetsu 12200 series =

Japanese train type

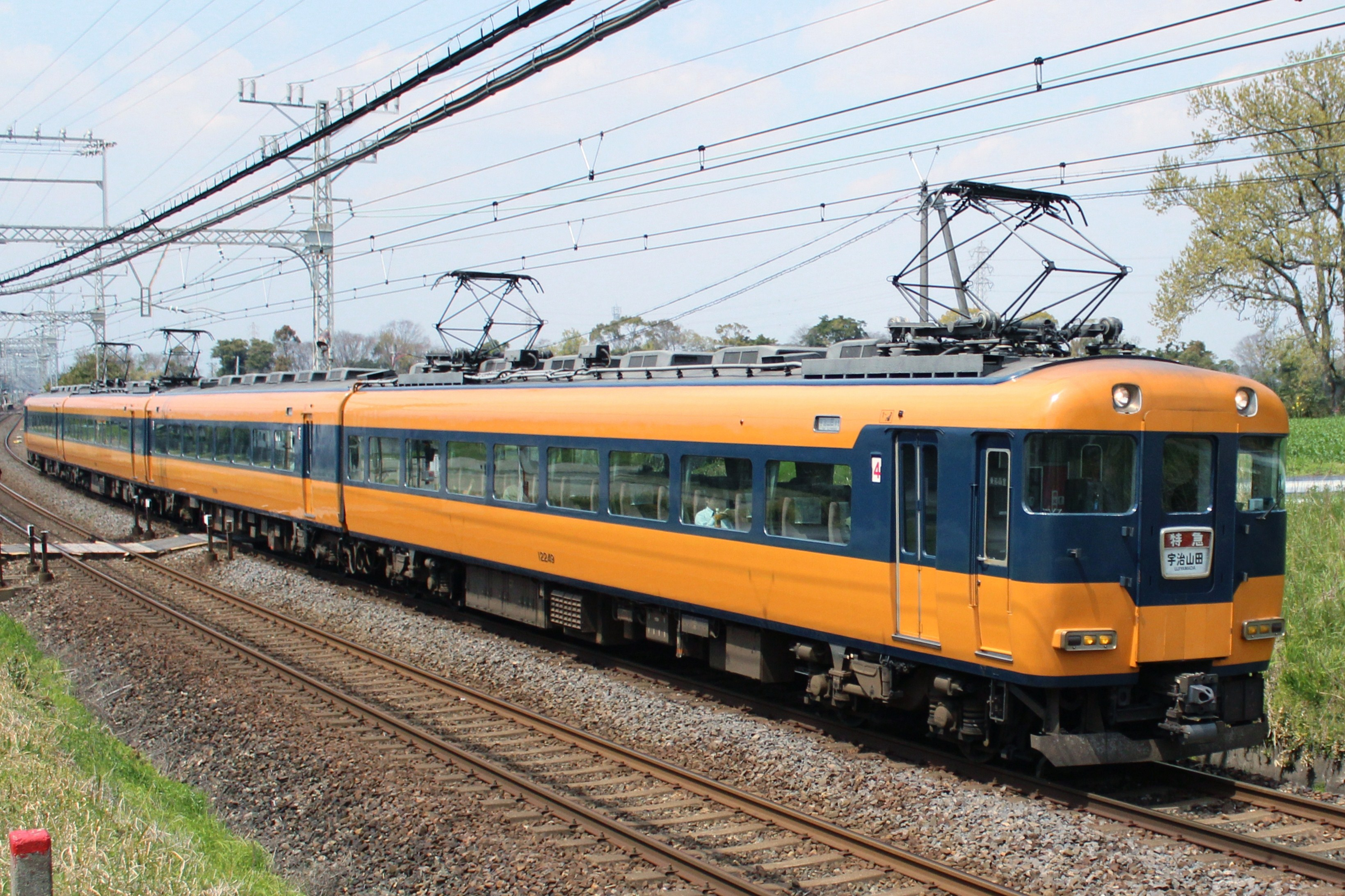
- A 12200 series train in April 2013
- In service: 1969–2021
- Manufacturer: Kinki Sharyo
- Family name: New Snack Car
- Constructed: 1969–1976
- Entered service: 1969
- Number built: 168 vehicles
- Formation: 2 or 4 cars per trainset
- Fleet numbers: N01–N32, N41–N42, NS33–NS40, NS43–NS56
- Operator: Kintetsu Railway
- Lines served: Kyoto Line; Osaka Line; Nagoya Line

Specifications
- Car length: 20,500 mm (67 ft 3 in)
- Width: 2,800 mm (9 ft 2 in)
- Height: 4,150 mm (13 ft 7 in)
- Electric system: 1,500 V DC overhead lines
- Current collection: Pantograph
- Track gauge: 1,435 mm (4 ft 8 1/2 in)

The Kintetsu 12200 series (近鉄12200系) was an electric multiple unit (EMU) train type operated by Kintetsu Railway in Japan from 1969 to 2021.

== History ==
A total of 168 cars were built between 1969 and 1976. As of January 2021, 24 cars were still in service. Regular limited-express operation ended in February 2021. A farewell run scheduled for 7 August 2021 had to be postponed due to COVID-19. The final farewell run took place on 20 November 2021.

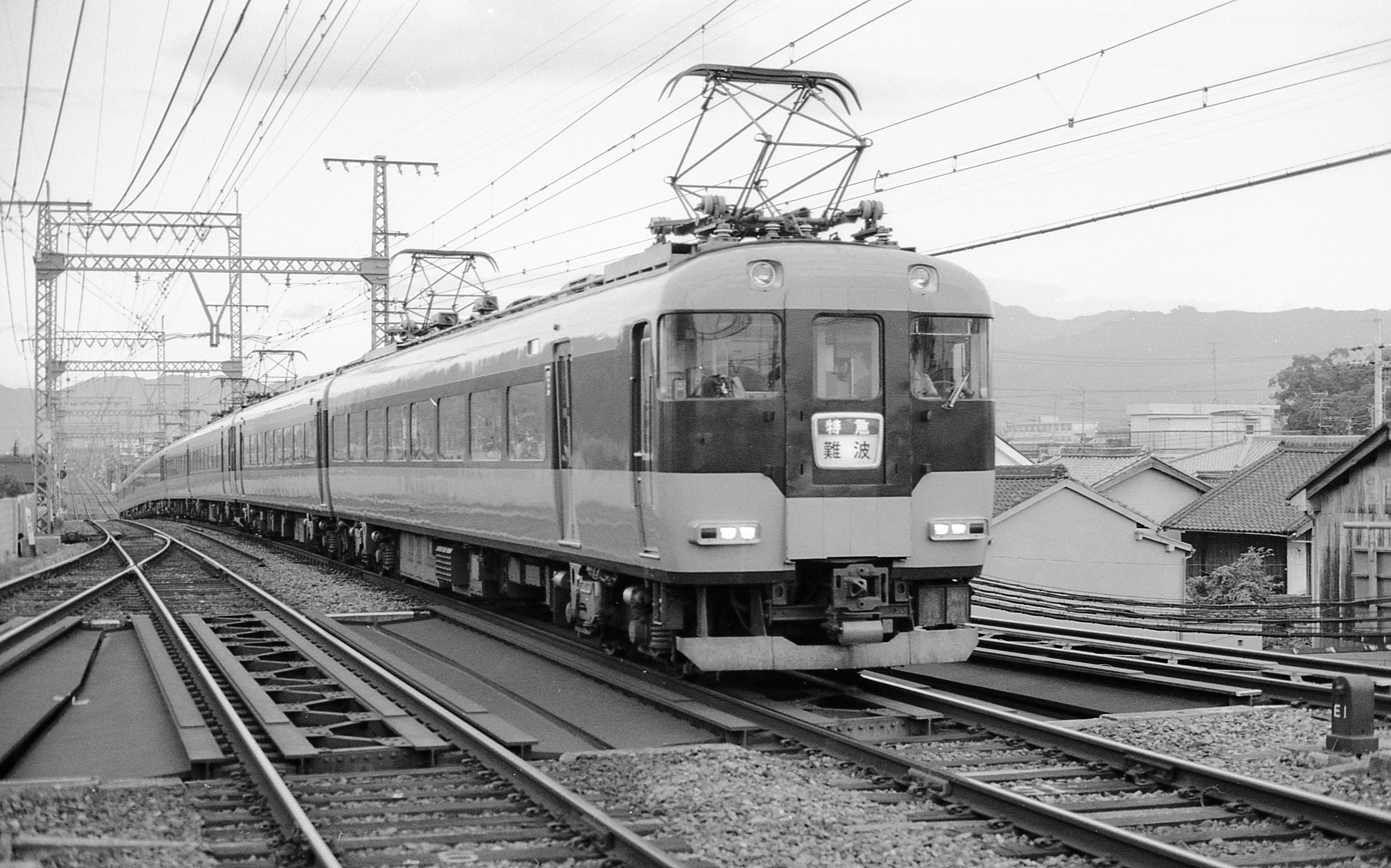
A 12200 series train in July 1984

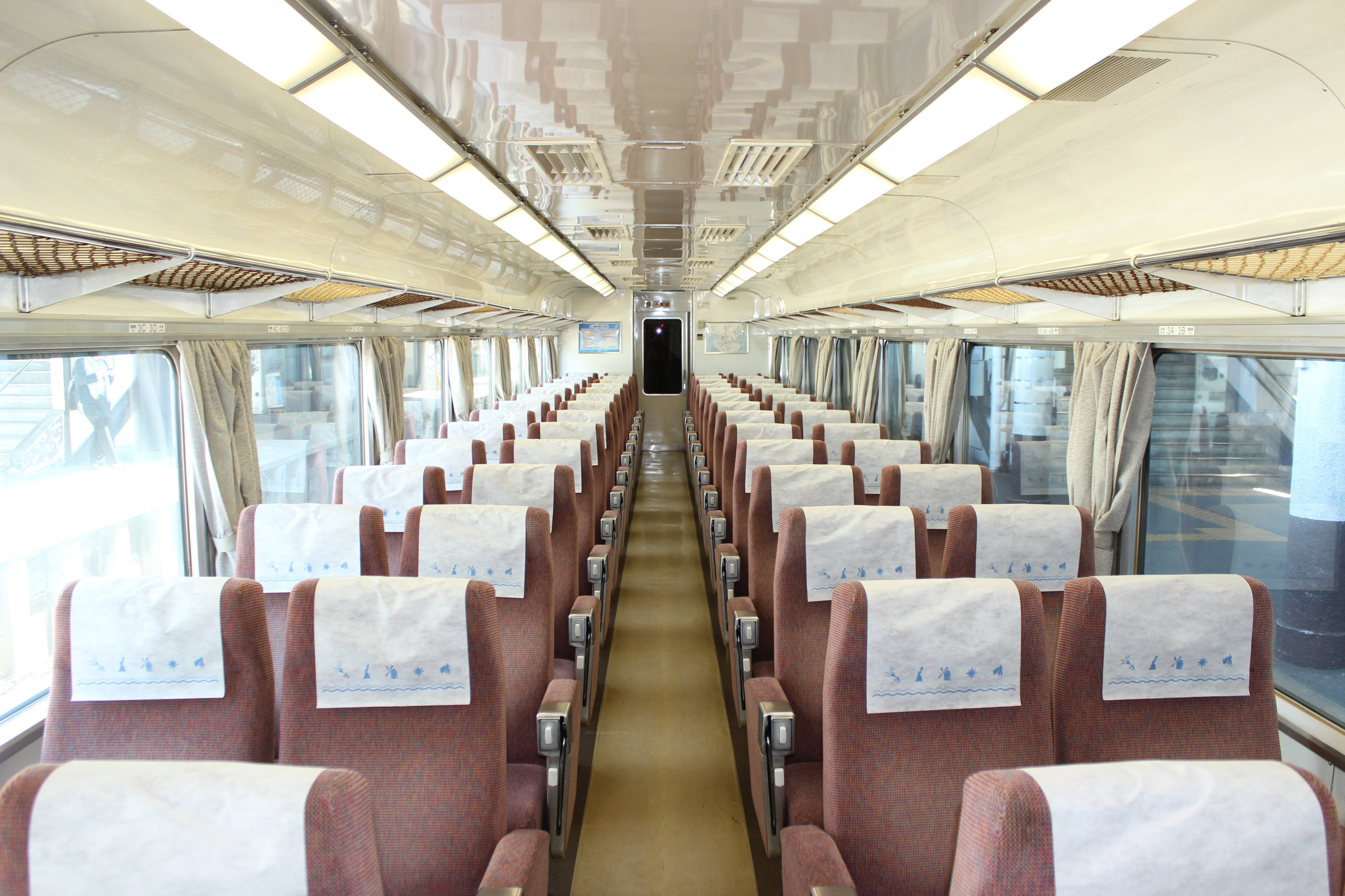
Interior

== Rebuilds ==
Some 12200 series trains were rebuilt into 15200 series and 15400 series trains.

Four-car set NS56 was refurbished for Aoniyoshi Limited Express services between Ōsaka Namba, Kintetsu Nara and Kyōto as the 19200 series, which began operating on 29 April 2022.
