= 松原市 =

松原市 may refer to:

- Songyuan, a city in Jilin, China
- Matsubara, Osaka, a city in Osaka, Japan
