= Kō Site =

Archaeological site in Fujiidera, Japan

- 国府遺跡 (Japanese)
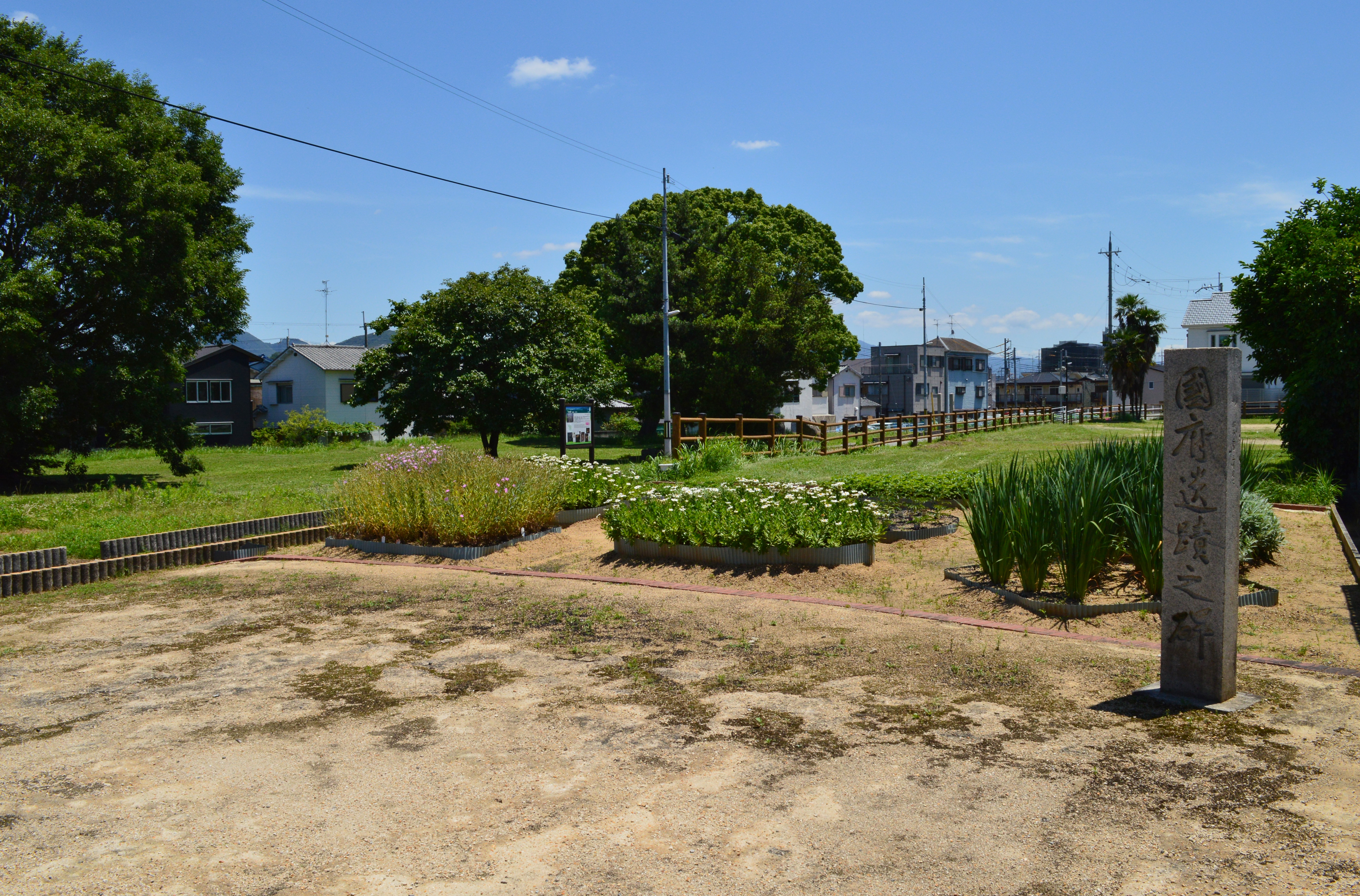
- Kō Site

- Kō Site Kō Site (Japan)
- Interactive map of Kō Site
- 34°34′32.0″N 135°37′15.8″E
- Periods: Japanese Paleolithic through Heian periods
- Location: Fujiidera, Osaka, Japan
- Region: Kansai region

Site notes
- Public access: Yes (park)

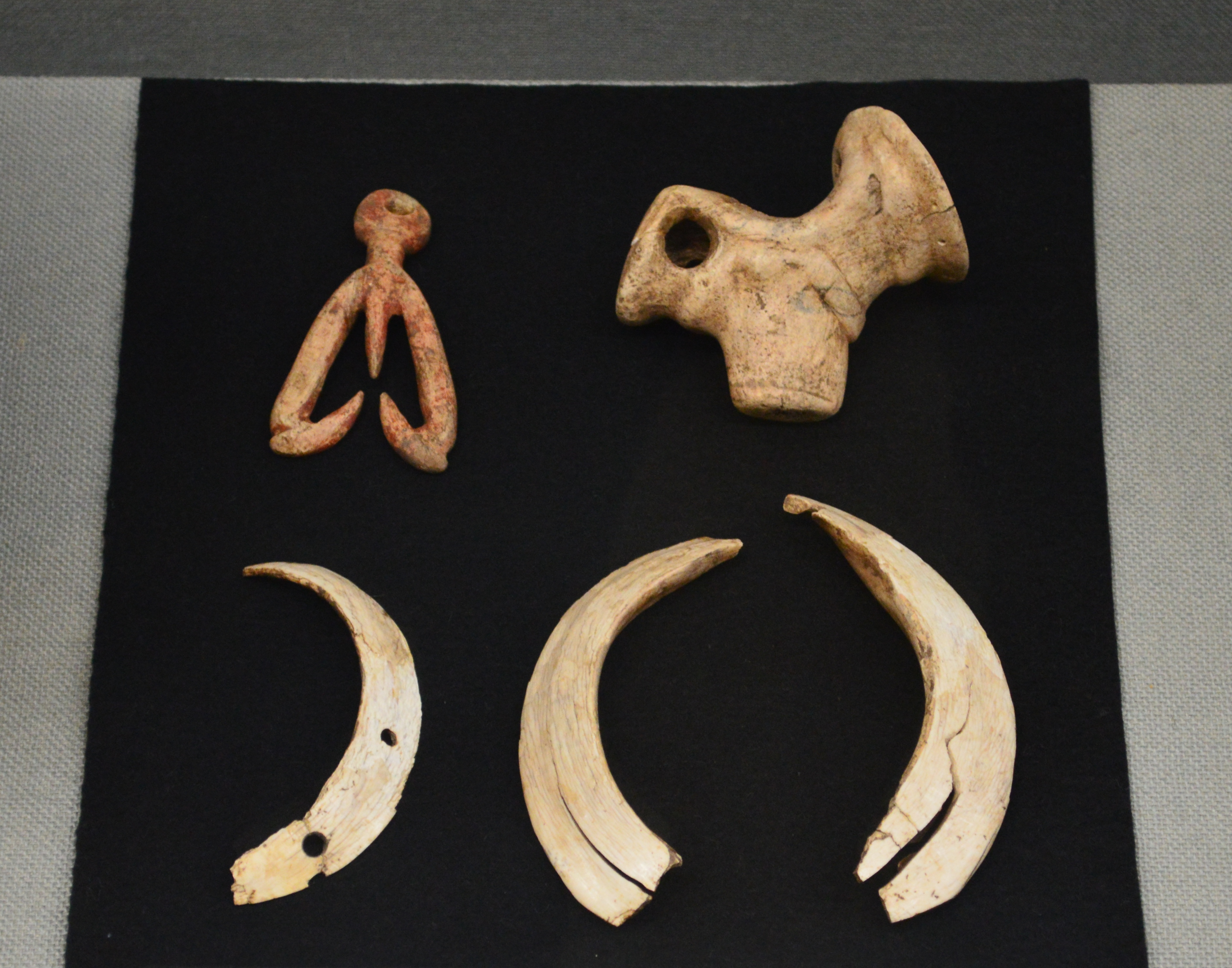
Artifacts found at the Kō Site

The Kō Site (国府遺跡, Kō iseki) is a complex archaeological site located in the Sosha neighborhood of the city of Fujiidera, Osaka Prefecture, in the Kansai region of Japan. It was designated a National Historic Site of Japan in 1974.

== Overview ==
Kō Site is located near the northeastern terrace cliff of the Habikino hill, west of the confluence of the Yamato and Ishikawa rivers. The site cameo academic attention in 1916 with the collection of stone tools that may have been in the Japanese Paleolithic period. At that time, it was believed by mainstream archaeologists that Japan did not have a Paleolithic period but the discovery of characteristic knife-shaped stone tools confirmed as this as a Paleolithic site. In upper layers the stratigraphy, human bones of the Jōmon and Yayoi periods, the underground storage pits of the Yayoi period, salt-making pottery of the Kofun period, and the remains of a Buddhist temple built in the Asuka period, indicate a pattern of continuous settlement and human activity over many thousands of years. The uppermost layers contained the remains of the Nara period provincial capital of Kawachi Province and included shards of porcelain, glazed pottery, earthenware, etc., as well as earthenware from into the Heian period have been excavated. Currently, a part of the site is maintained as a park. It is located about a 10-minute walk from Hajinosato Station on the Kintetsu Railway Minami Osaka Line.

== See also ==
- List of Historic Sites of Japan (Osaka)
