= Nunose Station =

Railway station in Matsubara, Osaka Prefecture, Japan

Nunose Station 布忍駅
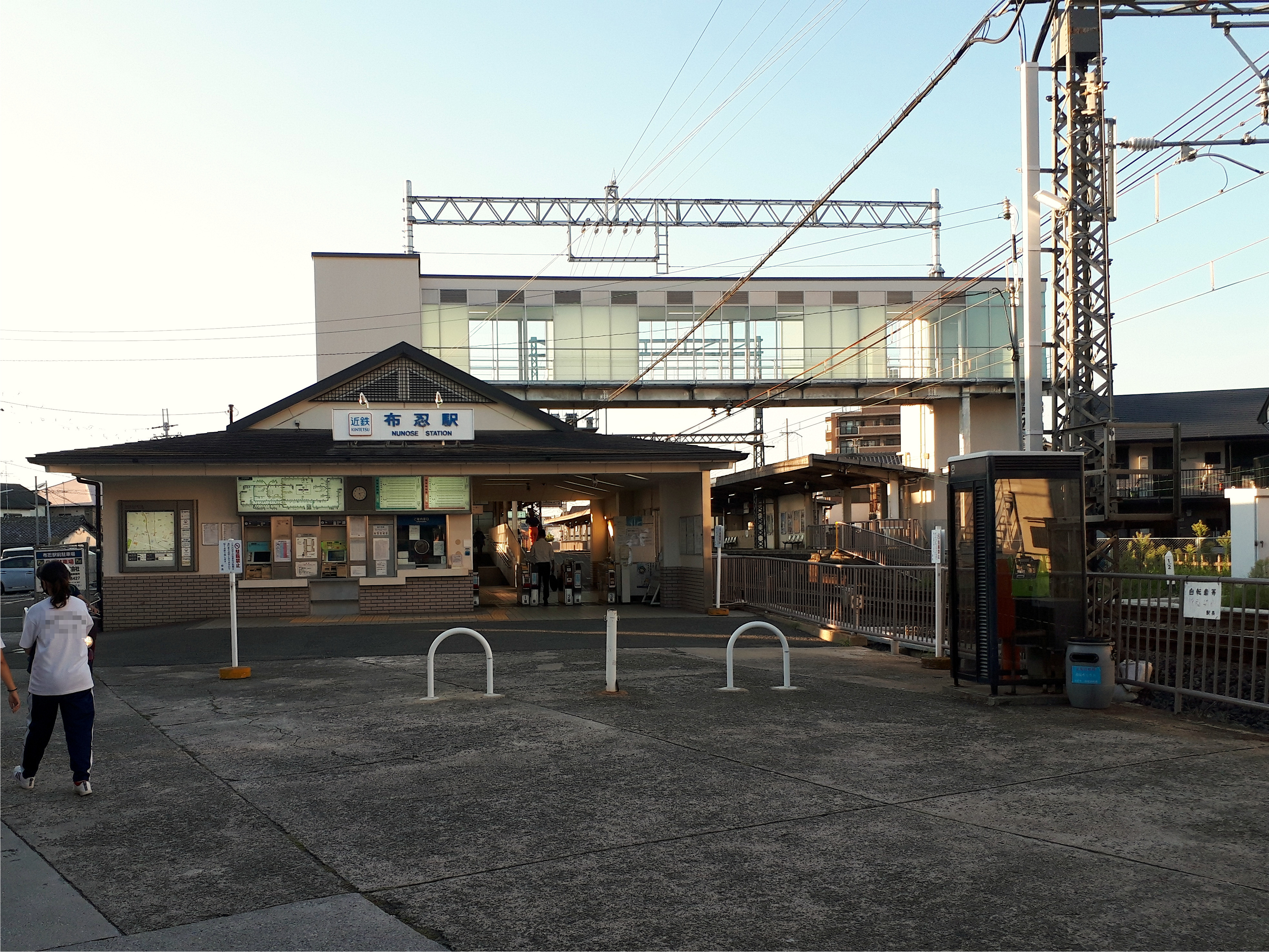
- Nunose Station in September 2020

General information
- Location: 2-1, Kitashimmachi 1-chōme, Matsubara-shi, Osaka-fu 580-0025; Japan
- Coordinates: 34°34′39″N 135°32′22″E
- Operator: Kintetsu Railway
- Line: Minami Osaka Line
- Distance: 8.3 km (5.2 mi) from Ōsaka Abenobashi
- Platforms: 2 side platforms
- Connections

Other information
- Station code: F08
- Website: Official website

History
- Opened: April 18, 1922; 104 years ago

Passengers
- FY2018: 5,057 daily
Location
- Location within Osaka Prefecture Location within Japan

Nunose Station (布忍駅, Nunose-eki) is a passenger railway station in located in the city of Matsubara, Osaka Prefecture, Japan, operated by the private railway operator Kintetsu Railway.

== Lines ==
Nunose Station is served by the Minami Osaka Line, and is located 8.3 rail kilometers from the starting point of the line at Ōsaka Abenobashi Station.

== Station layout ==
The station consists of two ground-level island platforms connected by an underground passage.

=== Platforms ===
1	■ Minami Osaka Line	for Fujiidera, Furuichi, Kashiharajingū-mae, Yoshino, and Kawachinagano
2	■ Minami Osaka Line	for Ōsaka Abenobashi

== Adjacent stations ==
«	Service	»
Minami Osaka Line
Kawachi-Amami	Local	Takaminosato
Semi-Express: Does not stop at this station
Suburban Express: Does not stop at this station
Express: Does not stop at this station
Limited Express: Does not stop at this station

== History ==
Nunose Station opened on April 18, 1922.

== Passenger statistics ==
In fiscal 2018, the station was used by an average of 5,057 passengers daily.

== Surrounding area ==
- Nunose Shrine
- Nishiyoke River
- Matsubara City Matsubara Third Junior High School
- Matsubara City Nunoshino Elementary School

== See also ==
- List of railway stations in Japan
