= Eganoshō Station =

Railway station in Habikino, Osaka Prefecture, Japan

Eganoshō Station 恵我ノ荘駅
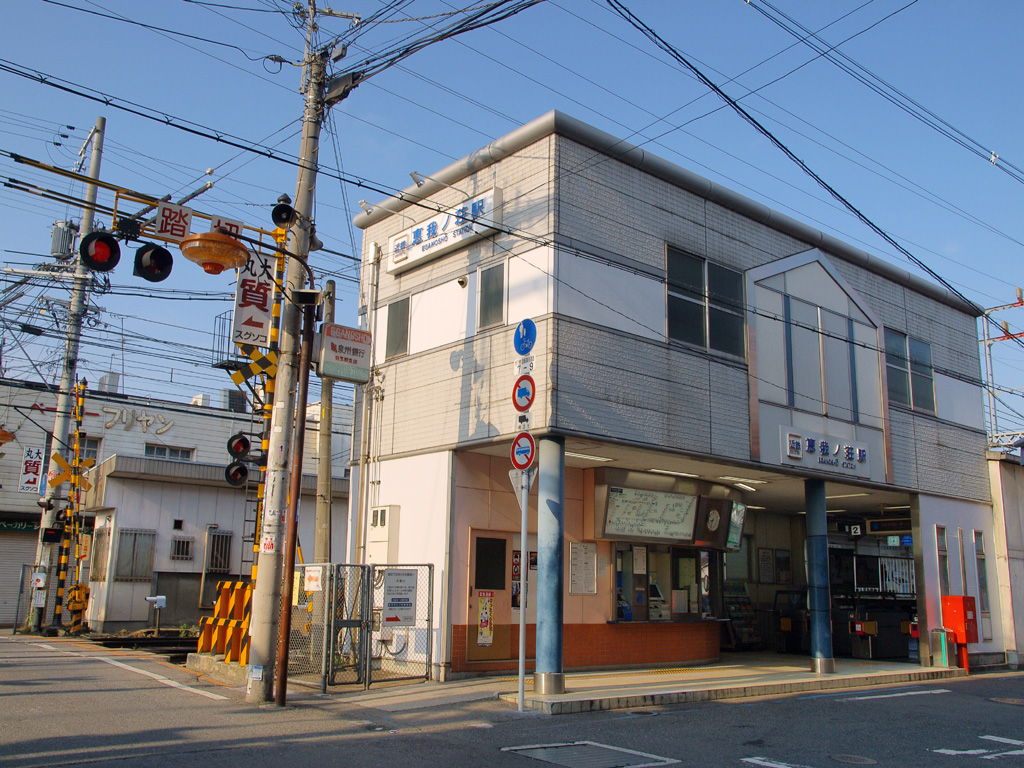
- Eganoshō Station

General information
- Location: 1-23, Minamieganoshō 8-chōme, Habikino-shi, Osaka-fu 583-0885; Japan
- Coordinates: 34°34′24″N 135°34′24″E
- Operator: Kintetsu Railway
- Line: Minami Osaka Line
- Distance: 11.6 km (7.2 mi) from Ōsaka Abenobashi
- Platforms: 2 side platforms
- Connections: Bus stop

Other information
- Station code: F11
- Website: Official website

History
- Opened: June 1, 1924; 102 years ago

Passengers
- FY2019: 10,677 daily
Location
- Location within Osaka Prefecture Location within Japan

Eganoshō Station (恵我ノ荘駅, Eganoshō-eki) is a passenger railway station in located in the city of Habikino, Osaka Prefecture, Japan, operated by the private railway operator Kintetsu Railway.

== Lines ==
Eganoshō Station is served by the Minami Osaka Line, and is located 11.6 rail kilometers from the starting point of the line at Ōsaka Abenobashi Station.

== Station layout ==
The station was consists of two opposed side platforms. There is no connection between platforms, and passengers wishing to change platforms must exit the station, cross by a level crossing, and reenter. The station is unattended.

=== Platforms ===
1	■ Minami Osaka Line	for Fujiidera, Furuichi, Kashiharajingū-mae, Yoshino, and Kawachinagano
2	■ Minami Osaka Line	for Ōsaka Abenobashi

== Adjacent stations ==
«	Service	»
Minami Osaka Line
Kawachi-Matsubara	Local	Takawashi
Semi-Express: Does not stop at this station
Suburban Express: Does not stop at this station
Express: Does not stop at this station
Limited Express: Does not stop at this station

== History ==
Eganoshō Station opened on June 1, 1924.

== Passenger statistics ==
In fiscal 2019, the station was used by an average of 10,677 passengers daily.

== Surrounding area ==
- Yoshimura Family Residence (National Important Cultural Property)
- Otsukayama Kofun
- Osaka Prefectural Otsuka High School
- Habikino City Eganosho Elementary School
- Habikino City Takawashi Elementary School

== See also ==
- List of railway stations in Japan
