= Fujii-dera =

Buddhist temple in Fujiidera, Osaka, Japan

- 葛井寺
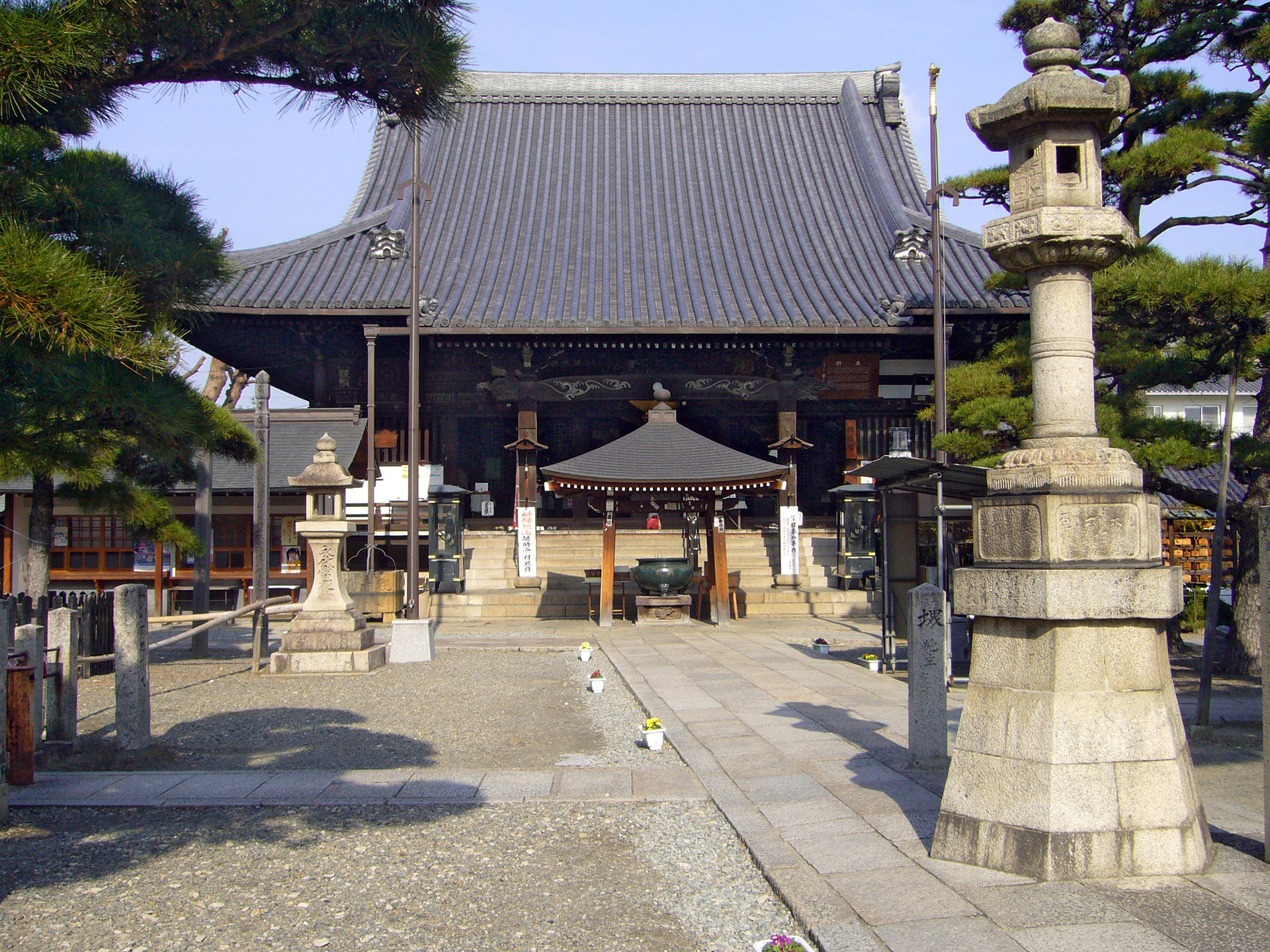
- Fujii-dera-ji Hondō

- Location within Osaka Prefecture Location within Japan

Religion
- Affiliation: Buddhist
- Deity: Senjū Jūichimen Kannon
- Rite: Shingon-shū Omuro-ha
- Status: functional

Location
- Location: 11-16-21 Fujiidera, Fujiidera-shi, Osaka-fu
- Interactive map of Fujii-dera
- Coordinates: 34°34′12.67″N 135°35′47.60″E

Architecture
- Founder: c. Gyōgi, Emperor Shōmu
- Completed: c.725

Website
- Official website
- National Treasure National Important Cultural Property

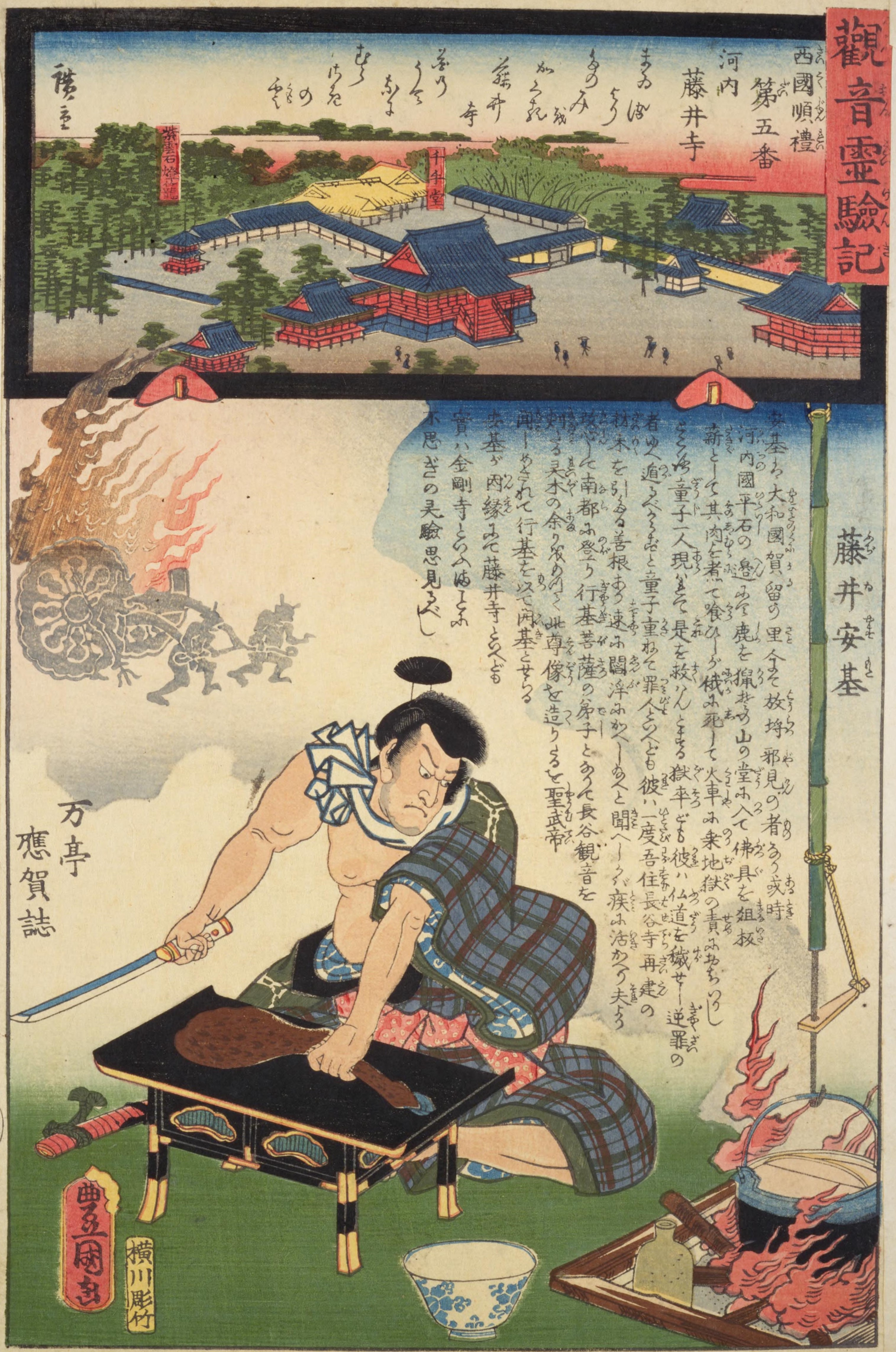
from the picture album "Kannon Reigen ki"

Fujii-dera (Japanese: 葛井寺) is a Buddhist temple located in the Fujiidera neighborhood of the city of Fujiidera, Osaka Prefecture Japan. It belongs to the Shingon-shū Omuro-ha sect of Japanese Buddhism and its honzon is a National Treasure statue of Senjū Jūichimen Kannon. The temple's full name is Shiun-san Fujii-dera (紫雲山 葛井寺). The temple is the 4th stop on the Saigoku Kannon Pilgrimage route.

== Overview ==
The origin of this temple is uncertain. According to temple legend, Gyōki founded the temple in 725 and it received the name of Kōkosan Fujii-dera (古子山葛井寺) or (Shiunsan Kōngōrin-ji) (紫雲山金剛琳寺) from Emperor Shōmu. It is believed to have originally been the clan temple of the Shirai clan, a toraijin clan descending from King Tatsuson of Baekje for served in many positions in the ancient Yamato government, and who changed their name to Fujii in 720. The temple was rebuilt in 807 by Prince Abo, the son of Emperor Heizei. His mother was Fujiko (a member of the Fujii clan), and Prince Abo's son, Ariwara no Narihira, constructed the inner sanctuary. While historical documents are scarce and unclear about the temple's history, the principal image of the temple, a seated Senjū Kannon statue, dates from the Nara period, and ancient roof tiles from the Nara period have been excavated within the temple grounds, suggesting that the temple was first built around the late 7th century. Furthermore, numerous Daian-ji-style roof tiles and Naniwa Palace-style roof tiles from the early 8th century have been unearthed, suggesting that the temple complex was renovated around this time. Historical documents indicate that a Fujii no Yasumoto had the temple repaired in 1096, and one the roof tiles excavated from the temple grounds is dated 1147.

During the Nanboku-chō period, the temple was used as a field headquarters for Kusunoki Masashige and was frequently subjected to fire and armed conflict. During the Muromachi period, Fujii-dera flourished as a branch of Kofuku-ji. Its temple complex was laid out in the Yakushi-ji-style with twin three-story pagodas, one on the east and west sides. However, in 1493, a civil war within the Hatakeyama clan led to a fire that destroyed the Rōmon Gate, Middle Gate, three-story pagoda, the Chinjū-sha Shrine, and the Oku-no-in complex, leaving only the main hall and one pagoda. This remaining pagoda was lost in an earthquake in 1510, and the current buildings were rebuilt by Toyotomi Hideyori in 1610. The current Main Hall was rebuilt in 1776 and Rōmon Gate in 1796.

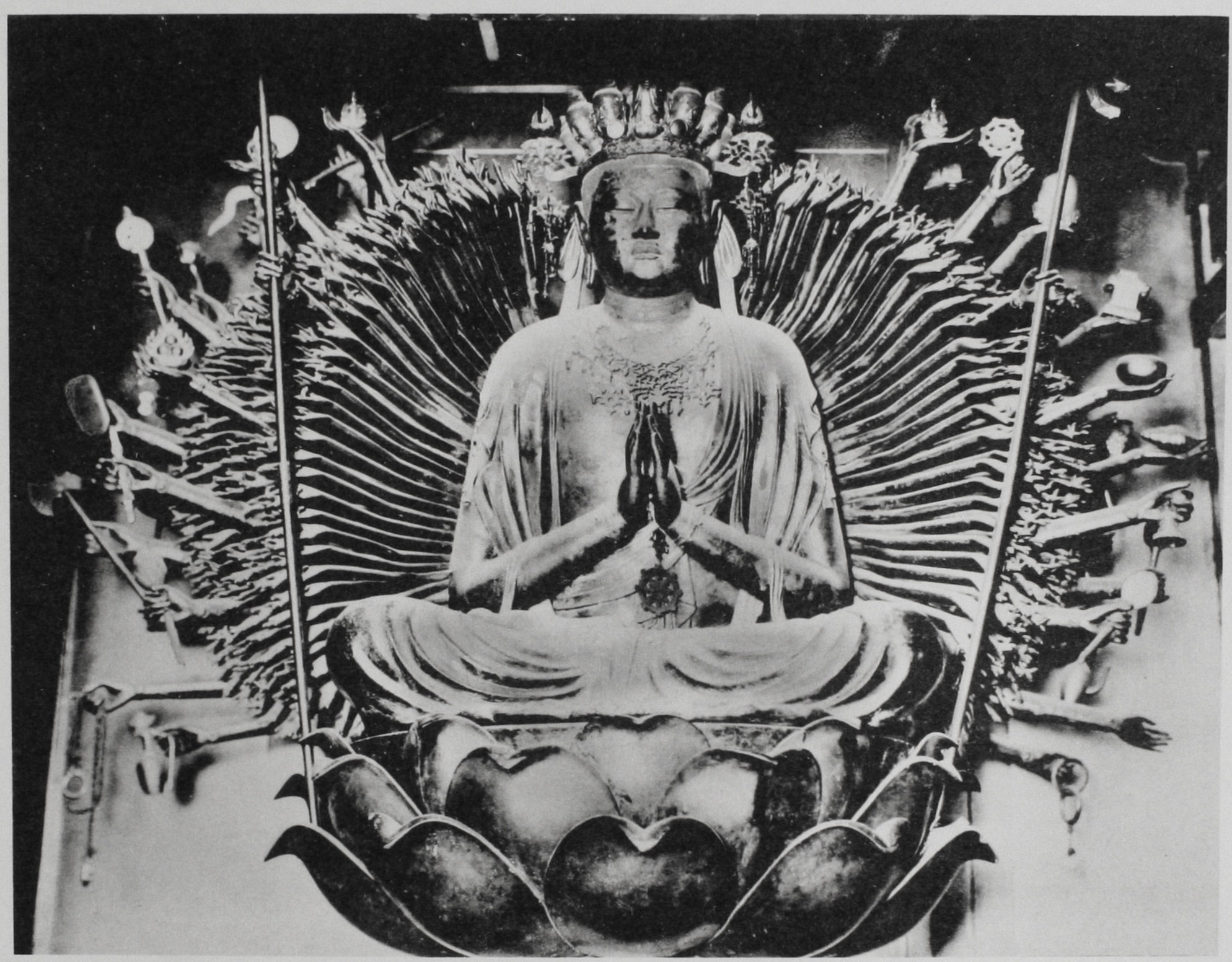
Senjū Kanon (NT)

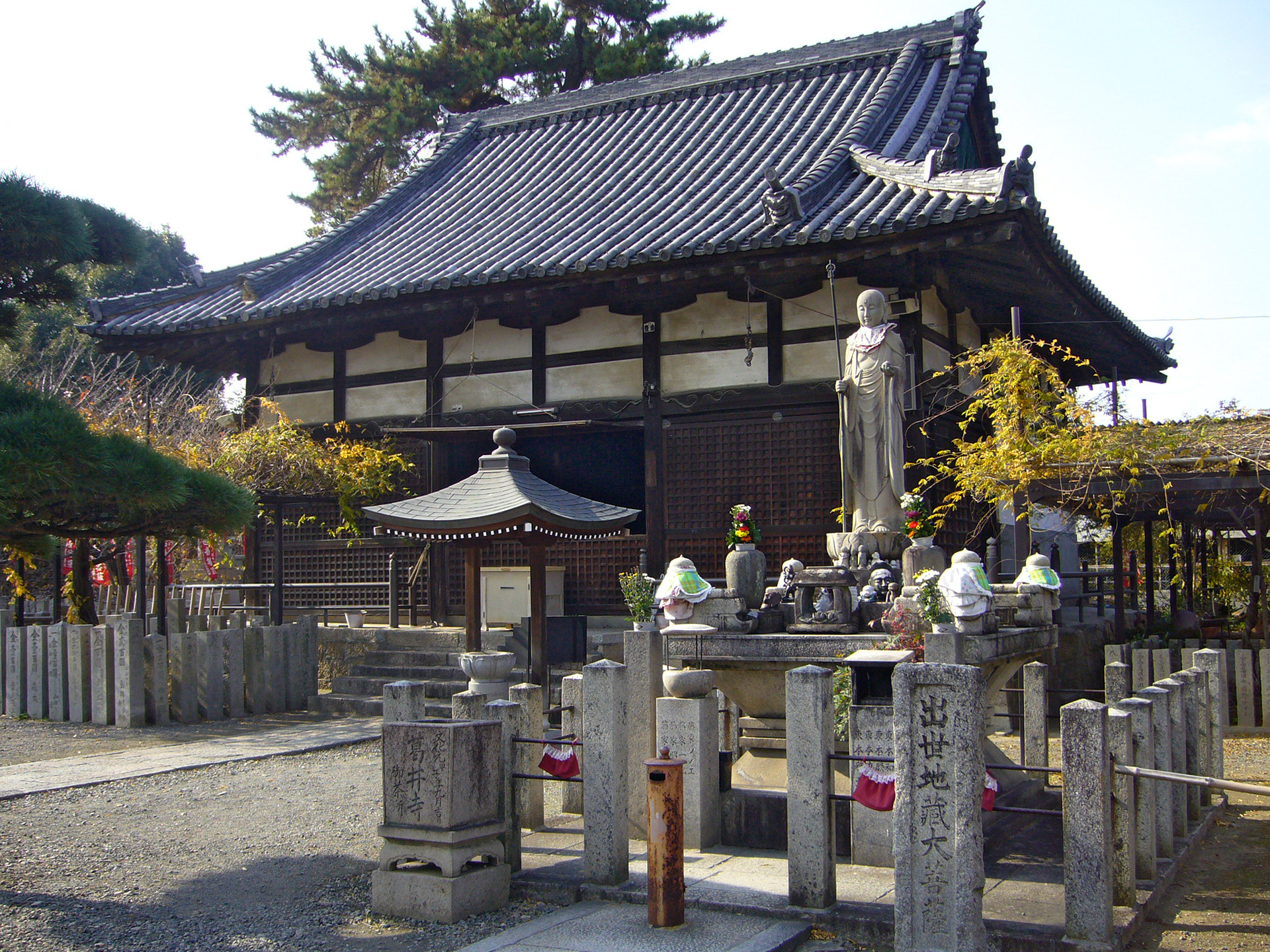
Amida-do and Shussei Jizō

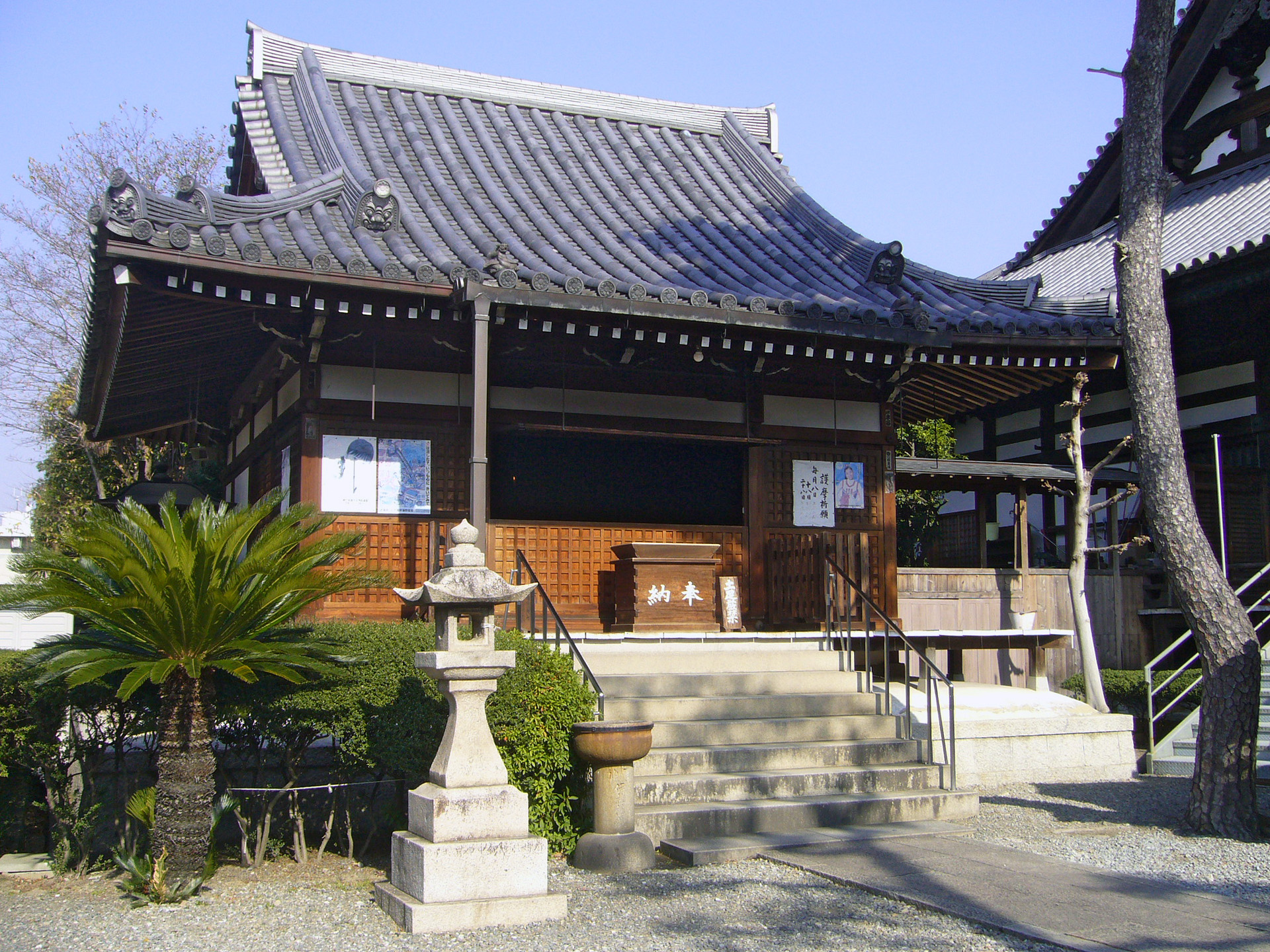
Goma-dō

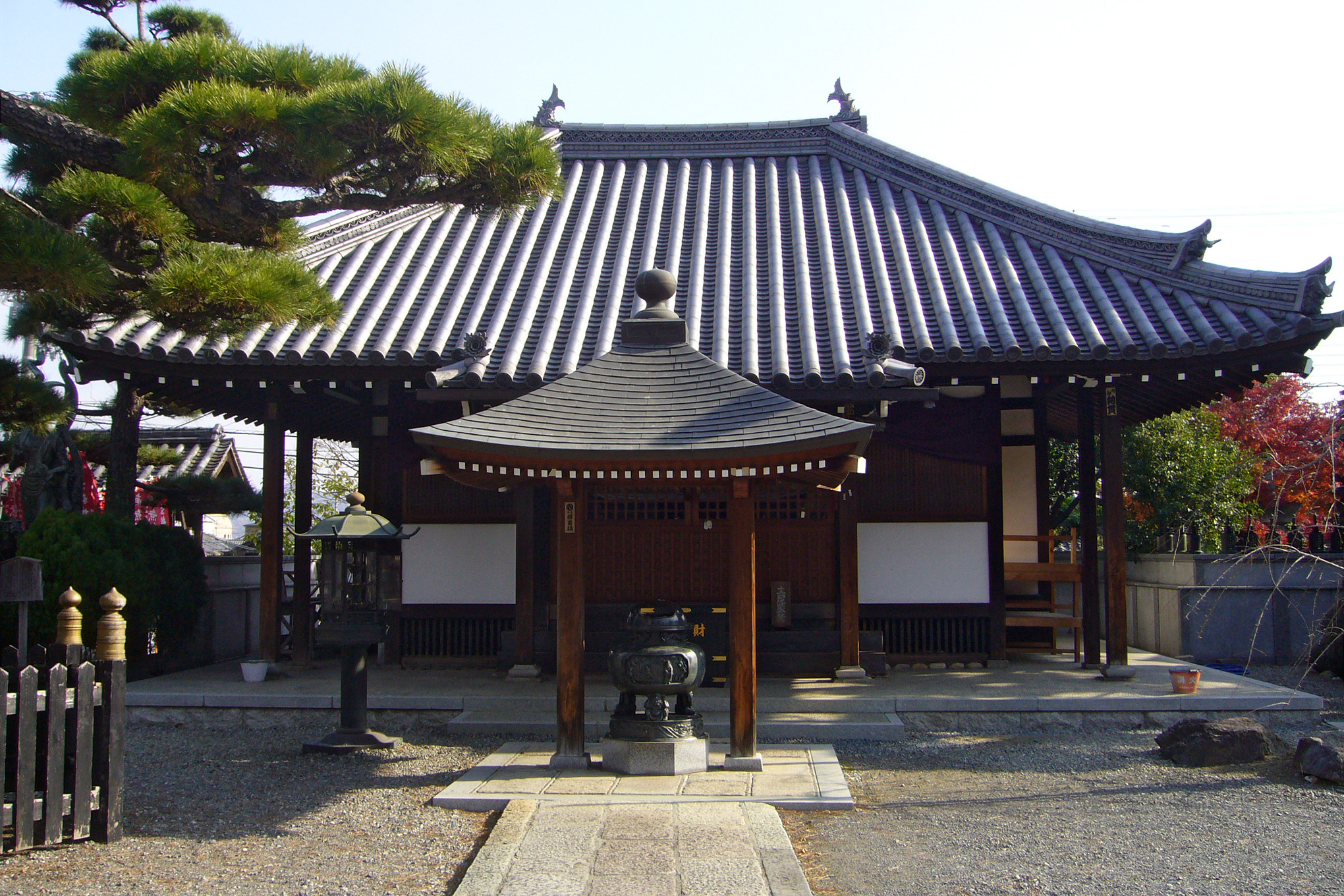
Daishi-dō

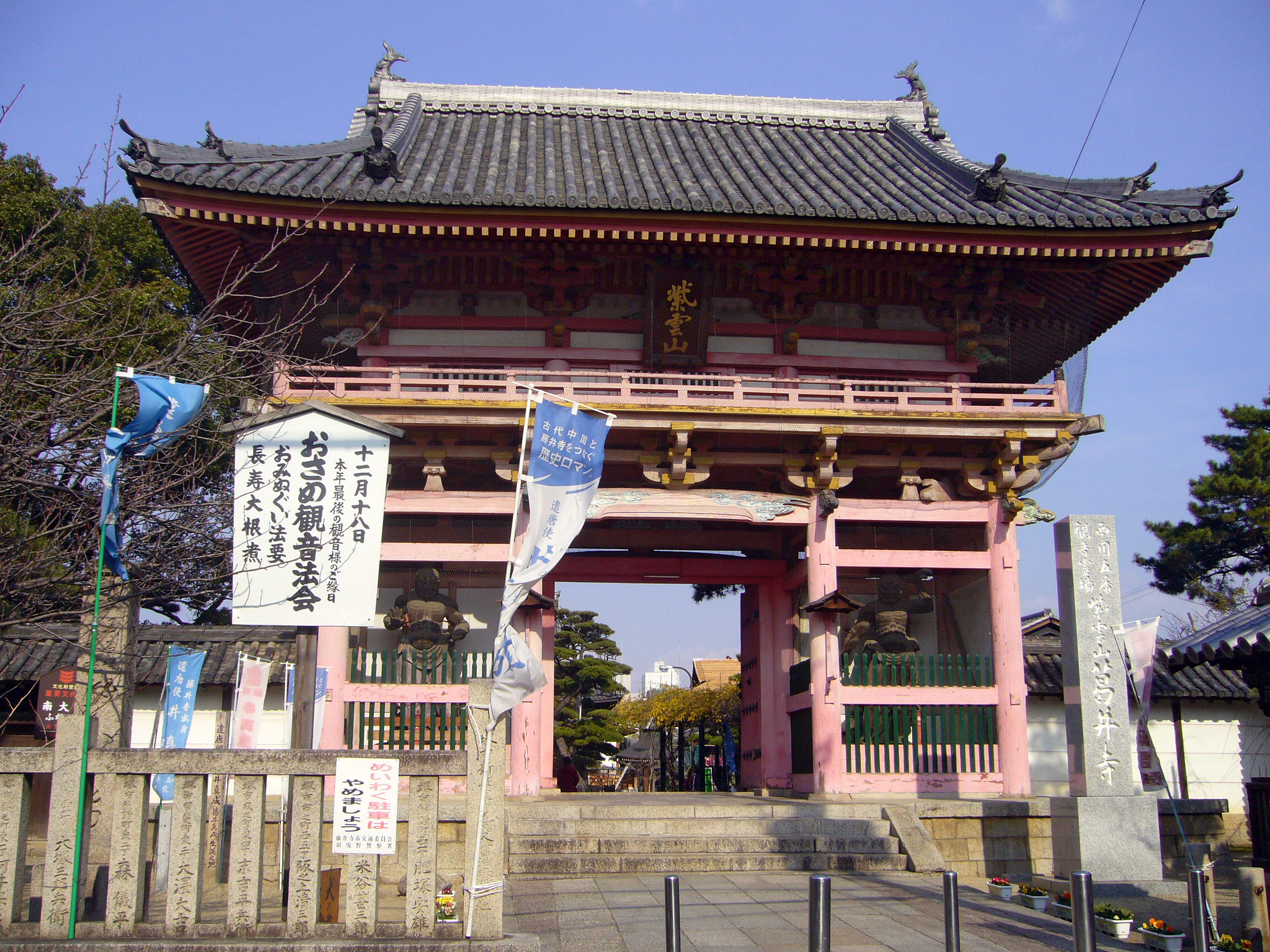
South Gate

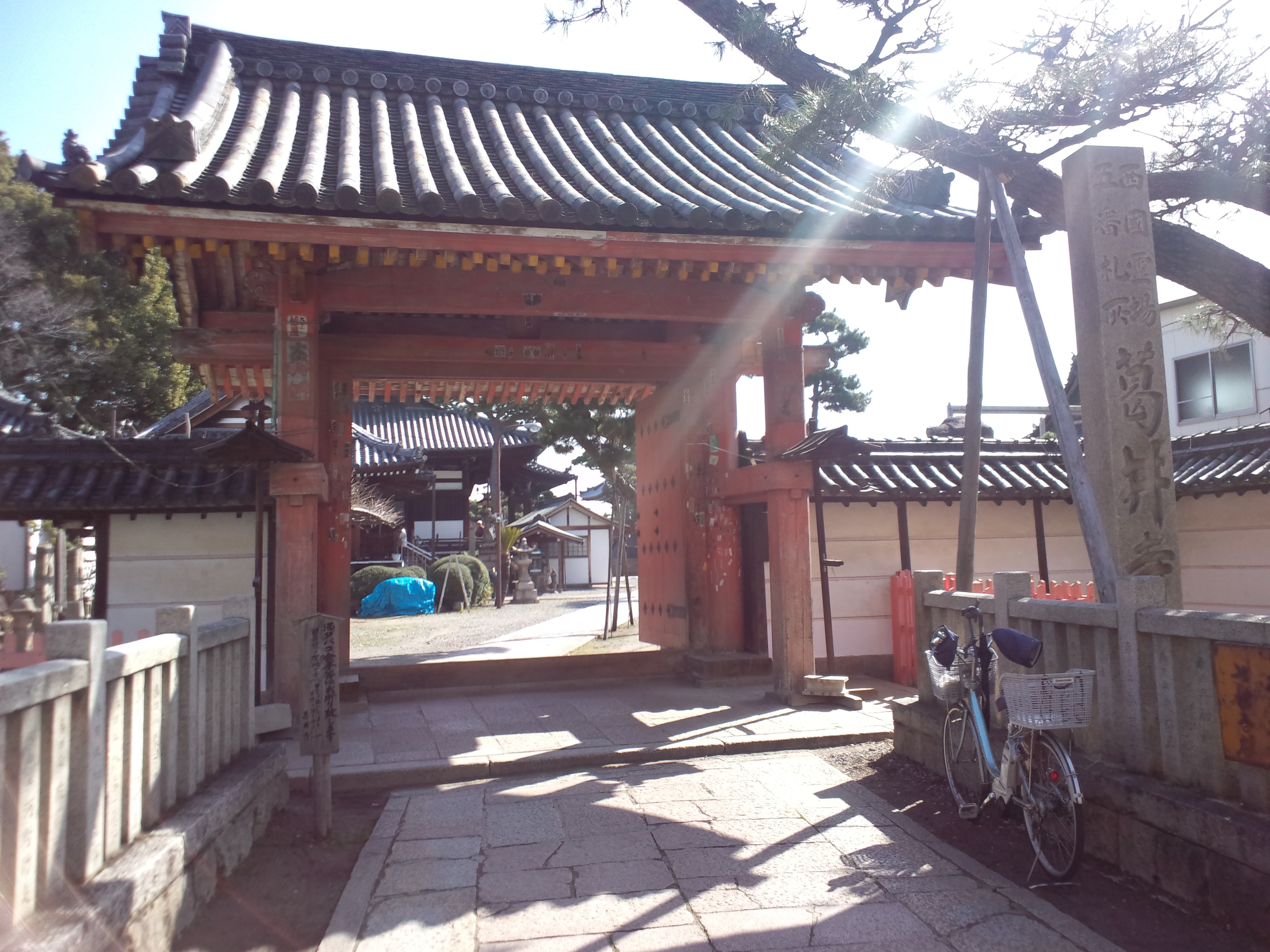
Western Gate

The temple is approximately a five-minute walk from Fujiidera Station on the Kintetsu Minami Osaka Line.

== Cultural Properties ==
=== National Treasure ===
- Dry Lacquer statue of seated Senjū Kannon (槇乾漆千手観音坐像), Tenpyō period; It is said that in 725, Emperor Shōmu, at the age of 42, had this statue commissioned to pray for protection from misfortune, and that the eye-opening ceremony was held by Gyōki. It is Japan's oldest Thousand-Armed Kannon statue and the only Tenpyō Buddha in Osaka Prefecture. It is one of the few Senjū Kannon statues to actually possess a thousand arms. Including the two hands clasped together in front of the chest, a total of 1,041 large and small side arms are spread out in a circle, making this the only Thousand-Armed Kannon statue known to have more than a thousand arms. During the Kamakura period, it was enshrined in a Hexagonal Treasure Hall. It sits on a five-tiered lotus throne with a treasure jar on an octagonal frame, and is 130.2 cm tall (to the top of the topknot) (144.2 cm tall including the Buddha face at the top). It was designated a National Treasure in 1938. The main body, including the hands in prayer, was made using the dry lacquer technique introduced from the Asian continent (the shape of the statue is created by layering hemp cloth with lacquer), and is combined with large and small side hands made of dry lacquer wood. The large and small side hands, excluding the hands in prayer, are attached to two supports erected behind the statue and are separate from the main body, but when viewed from the front, they appear to have a thousand arms sprouting from the statue.

=== National Important Cultural Properties ===
- West Gate (槇四脚門(西門)), Azuchi-Momoyama period (1601);

=== Osaka Prefecture Designated Tangible Cultural Properties ===
- Stone Lantern (石灯籠), Kamakura period; 230-cm tall
- Gilded bronze pagoda (金銅宝塔), pre-Kamakura period; 45-cm tall
- Fujii-dera Pilgrimage Mandala (葛井寺参詣曼荼羅), Muromachi period (1519)

=== Fujiidera City Designated Tangible Cultural Properties ===
- Wooden statue of standing Shō-Kannon Bosatsu (木造聖観音菩薩立像), Heian period; now at Osaka City Museum of Art
- Wooden statue of standing Jizo Bosatsu (地蔵菩薩立像), Heian period;
- Wooden statues of standing Amida Nyorai and 25 Bosatsu (阿弥陀如来及び二十五菩薩像), Edo period (1731);

== See also ==
- List of National Treasures of Japan (sculptures)
