= Fujiidera =

Fujiidera 藤井寺市
- City
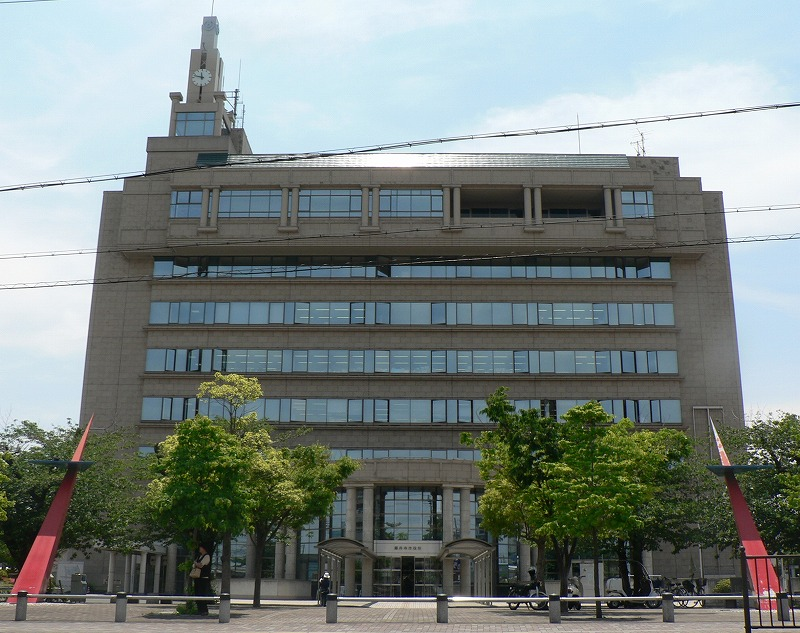
- Fujiidera city office

- Flag Emblem

- Location of Fujiidera in Osaka Prefecture

- Location in Japan
- Coordinates: 34°34′N 135°36′E
- Country: Japan
- Region: Kansai
- Prefecture: Osaka

Government
  - Mayor: Kazuhiko Iseki

Area
  - Total: 8.89 km^{2} (3.43 sq mi)

Population (January 31, 2022)
  - Total: 63,446
  - Density: 7,140/km^{2} (18,500/sq mi)
- Time zone: UTC+09:00 (JST)
- City hall address: 1-1-1 Ichioka, Fujiidera-shi, Ōsaka-fu 583-8583
- Website: Official website
- Symbols
- Flower: Chrysanthemum
- Tree: Ume

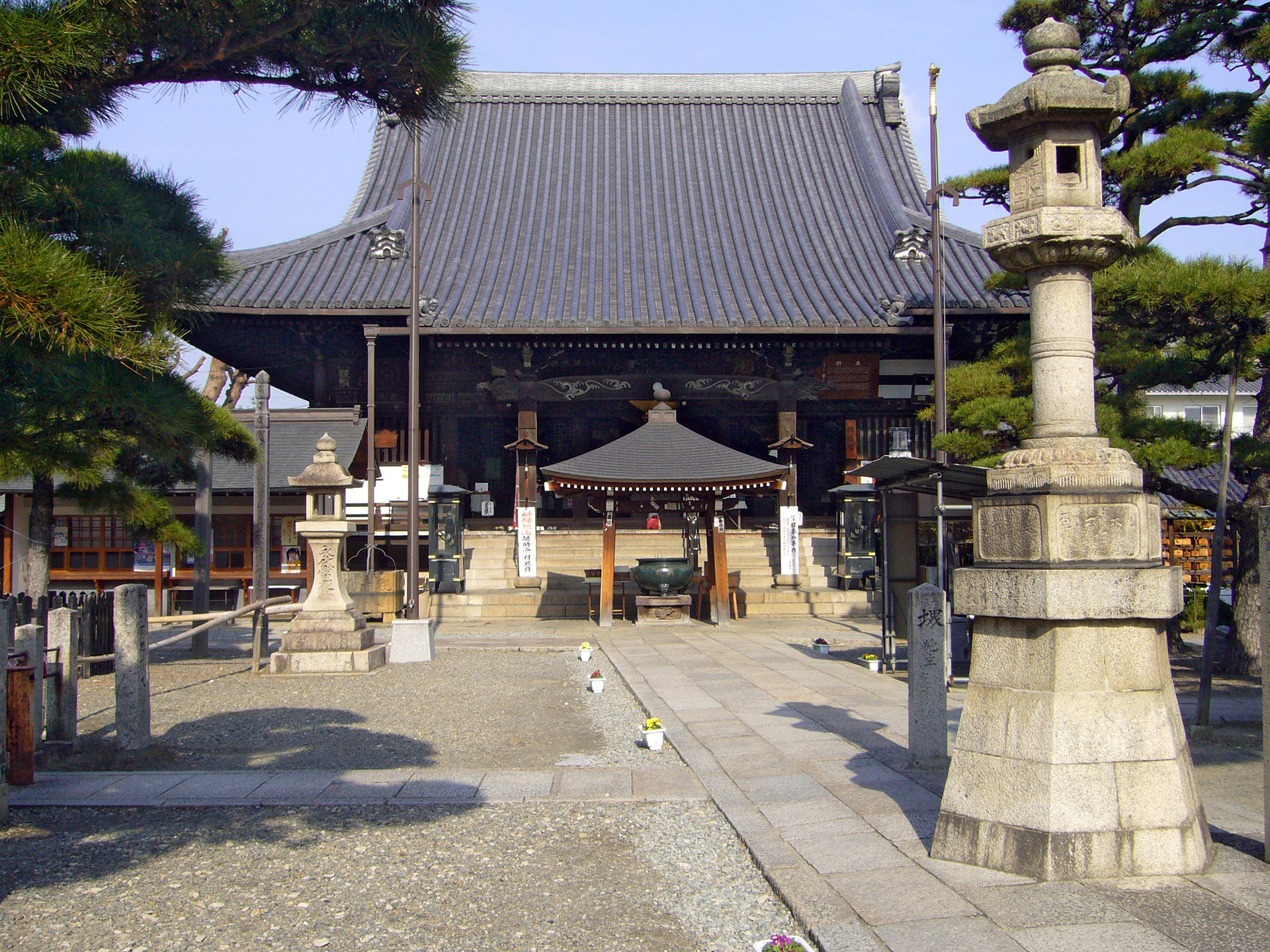
The temple of Fujii-dera, after which the city is named

Fujiidera (藤井寺市, Fujiidera-shi) is a city located in Osaka Prefecture, Japan. As of 31 January 2022, the city had an estimated population of 63,446 in 29501 households and a population density of 7100 persons per km^{2}. The total area of the city is 8.89 square kilometres (3.43 sq mi).

== Geography ==
Fujiidera is located in the southeastern part of the Osaka Plain, at the confluence of the Yamato and the Ishikawa rivers. The city area is almost flat and the rivers are bounded by high levees that protect low-lying areas from flooding. Sections of both river banks are maintained for recreation.

=== Neighboring municipalities ===
Osaka Prefecture

- Habikino
- Kashiwara
- Matsubara
- Yao

== Climate ==
Fujiidera has a humid subtropical climate (Köppen Cfa) characterized by warm summers and cool winters with light to no snowfall. The average annual temperature in Fujiidera is 14.9 °C. The average annual rainfall is 1475 mm with September as the wettest month. The temperatures are highest on average in August, at around 27.0 °C, and lowest in January, at around 3.5 °C.

== Demographics ==
Per Japanese census data, the population of Fujiidera has increased rapidly in the 1960s and 1970s, and at a slower rate until the year 2000.

Historical population
Year	Pop.	±%
1920	8,053	—
1930	10,413	+29.3%
1940	13,116	+26.0%
1950	17,911	+36.6%
1960	26,509	+48.0%
1970	50,414	+90.2%
1980	63,726	+26.4%
1990	65,922	+3.4%
2000	66,806	+1.3%
2010	66,174	−0.9%

== History ==
The area of the modern city of Fujiidera was within ancient Kawachi Province and was the location of the provincial capital of that province. The area was settled by immigrants from the Korean kingdom of Baekje, led by the Kudara no Konikishi clan, exiled descendants of the Baekje royal family during the late Asuka Period. Centuries later, it was the site of the Battle of Dōmyōji, during the 1615 Siege of Osaka. The village of Nagano was established within Tannan District and the villages of Koyama, Domyoji and Sawada within Shiki District with the creation of the modern municipalities system on April 1, 1889. Dōmyōji and Sawada subsequently merged on March 31, 1890. On April 1, 1896 the area became part of Minamikawachi District, Osaka and Nagano was renamed Fujiidera village the same year. Fujiidera annexed Koyama in 1915 and was promoted to town status on October 1, 1928. Dōmyōji was promoted to town status on January 1, 1951. On April 20, 1959, the towns of Fujiidera and Dōmyōji merged to become the town of Fujiidera-Dōmyōji. The town was renamed Misasagi on January 1, 1960. Misasagi was promoted to city status on November 1, 1966.

Fujiidera Stadium, a baseball stadium built in 1928 and last owned by the Kintetsu Buffaloes, was previously located in Fujiidera. The team used the stadium until 1996, before relocating to the newly built Osaka Dome for the 1997 season. Fujiidera Stadium was closed in 2005 and the site redeveloped.

== Government ==
Fujiidera has a mayor-council form of government with a directly elected mayor and a unicameral city council of 14 members. Fujiidera contributes one member to the Osaka Prefectural Assembly. In terms of national politics, the city is part of Osaka 14th district of the lower house of the Diet of Japan.

== Economy ==
Fujiidera is a regional commercial center, with a small amount of light manufacturing.

== Education ==
Fujiidera has seven public elementary schools and three public middle schools operated by the city government and three public high schools operated by the Osaka Prefectural Department of Education. There is one private elementary school, one private middle school and one private high school. The private Osaka Women's Junior College is also located in Fujiidera.

== Transportation ==
=== Railway ===
Kintetsu Railway - Kintetsu Minami Osaka Line

- Fujiidera - Hajinosato - Dōmyōji

Kintetsu Railway - Kintetsu Dōmyōji Line

- Dōmyōji

=== Highway ===
- Nishi-Meihan Expressway
- National Route 170

== Sister cities ==
- Huangshan City, Anhui Province, China

== Local attractions ==
- Domyoji-Tenmangu
- Dōmyō-ji
- Fujii-dera
- Furuichi Kofun Cluster, World Heritage Site
  - The tomb of Emperor Chūai, the 14th emperor of Japan
  - The tomb of Emperor Ingyo, the 19th emperor of Japan
- Kō Site, National Historic Site

== Noted people from Fujiidera ==
- Hananokuni Akihiro, former sumo wrestler
- Senri Oe, musician
- Makoto Sumikawa, actress
