= Kawachi-Matsubara Station =

Railway station in Matsubara, Osaka Prefecture, Japan

Kawachi-Matsubara Station 河内松原駅
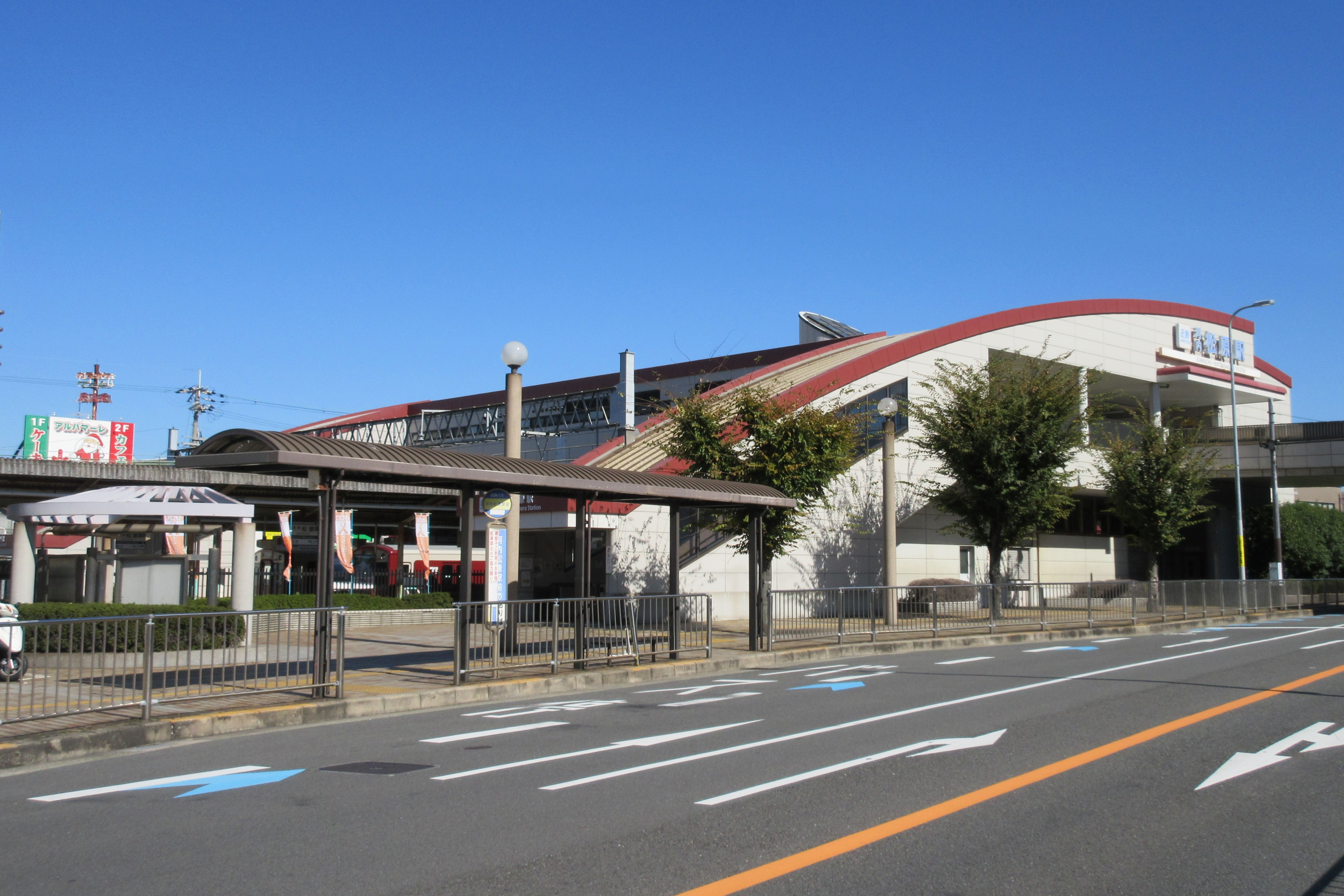
- Kawachi-Matsubara Station, November 2019

General information
- Location: 5-1, Ueda 3-chōme, Matsubara-shi, Osaka-fu 580-0016; Japan
- Coordinates: 34°34′32″N 135°33′26″E
- Operator: Kintetsu Railway
- Line: Minami Osaka Line
- Distance: 10.0 km (6.2 mi) from Ōsaka Abenobashi
- Platforms: 2 island platforms
- Connections

Other information
- Station code: F10
- Website: Official website

History
- Opened: April 18, 1922; 104 years ago

Passengers
- FY2018: 29,976 daily
Location
- Location within Osaka Prefecture Location within Japan

Kawachi-Matsubara Station (河内松原駅, Kawachi-Matsubara-eki) is a passenger railway station in located in the city of Matsubara, Osaka Prefecture, Japan, operated by the private railway operator Kintetsu Railway.

== Lines ==
Takawashi Station is served by the Minami Osaka Line, and is located 10.0 rail kilometers from the starting point of the line at Ōsaka Abenobashi Station.

== Station layout ==
The station consists of two ground-level island platforms connected by an elevated station building. Inside the wickets, there is a small kiosk selling pastries and sandwiches, as well as vending machines for drinks. The publicly-accessible portion outside the gates also contains a Family Mart convenience store and a Mr. Donut shop. The station building is linked to the south with elevated pedestrian decks over Prefectural Route 12 leading to the Youmenity Matsubara shopping complex and adjacent bus terminal.

=== Platforms ===
1, 2	■ Minami-Osaka Line	for Fujiidera, Furuichi, Kashiharajingū-mae, Yoshino, and Kawachinagano
3, 4	■ Minami-Osaka Line	for Ōsaka Abenobashi

== Adjacent stations ==
«	Service	»
Minami Osaka Line
Takaminosato	Local	Eganoshō
Ōsaka Abenobashi	Semi-Express	Fujiidera
Suburban Express: Does not stop at this station
Express: Does not stop at this station
Limited Express: Does not stop at this station

== History ==
Kawachi-Matsubara Station opened on April 18, 1922.

== Passenger statistics ==
In fiscal 2018, the station was used by an average of 29,976 passengers daily.

== Surrounding area ==
- Shibagaki Shrine
- Osaka Prefectural Ikuno High School
- Matsubara City Matsubara Junior High School
- Matsubara Elementary School
- Matsubara City Hall
- Youmenity Matsubara, a shopping mall across the station, connected by a sky bridge.

== See also ==
- List of railway stations in Japan
