= Takaminosato Station =

Railway station in Matsubara, Osaka Prefecture, Japan

Takaminosato Station 高見ノ里駅
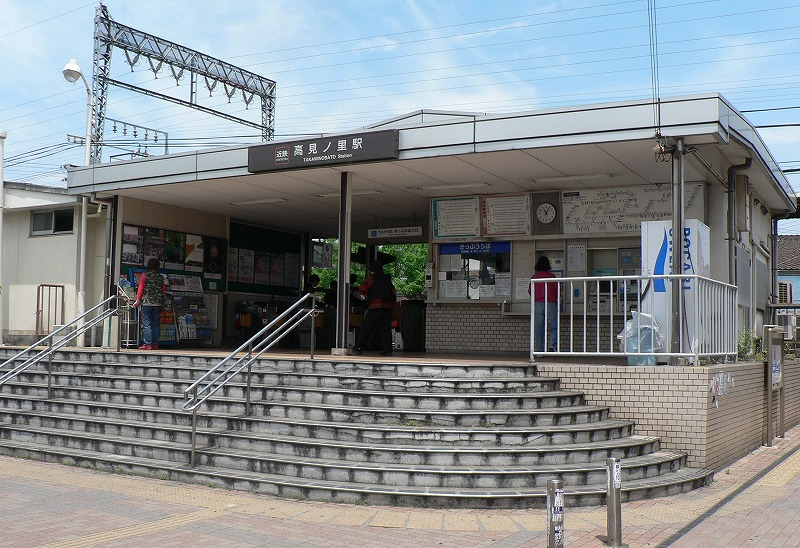
- Takaminosato Station, May 2007

General information
- Location: 1-1, Takamonosato 3-chōme, Matsubara-shi, Osaka-fu 580-0021; Japan
- Coordinates: 34°34′30″N 135°32′48″E
- Operator: Kintetsu Railway
- Line: Minami Osaka Line
- Distance: 9.1 km (5.7 mi) from Ōsaka Abenobashi
- Platforms: 2 side platforms
- Connections

Other information
- Station code: F09
- Website: Official website

History
- Opened: September 1, 1932; 93 years ago

Passengers
- FY2018: 6,619 daily
Location
- Location within Osaka Prefecture Location within Japan

Takaminosato Station (高見ノ里駅, Takaminosato-eki) is a passenger railway station in located in the city of Matsubara, Osaka Prefecture, Japan, operated by the private railway operator Kintetsu Railway.

== Lines ==
Takaminosato Station is served by the Minami Osaka Line, and is located 9.1 rail kilometers from the starting point of the line at Ōsaka Abenobashi Station.

== Station layout ==
The station consists of two ground-level side platforms connected by an underground passage.

=== Platforms ===
1	■ Minami Osaka Line	for Fujiidera, Furuichi, Kashiharajingū-mae, Yoshino, and Kawachinagano
2	■ Minami Osaka Line	for Ōsaka Abenobashi

== Adjacent stations ==
«	Service	»
Minami Osaka Line
Nunose	Local	Kawachi-Matsubara
Semi-Express: Does not stop at this station
Suburban Express: Does not stop at this station
Express: Does not stop at this station
Limited Express: Does not stop at this station

== History ==
Takaminosato Station opened on September 1, 1932.

== Passenger statistics ==
In fiscal 2018, the station was used by an average of 6,619 passengers daily.

== Surrounding area ==
- Hannan University Senior High School
- Matsubara City Cultural Hall
- Matsubara Library
- Matsubara Municipal Gymnasium

== See also ==
- List of railway stations in Japan
