= Osaka Women's Junior College =

Coordinates: 34°34′07″N 135°35′22″E

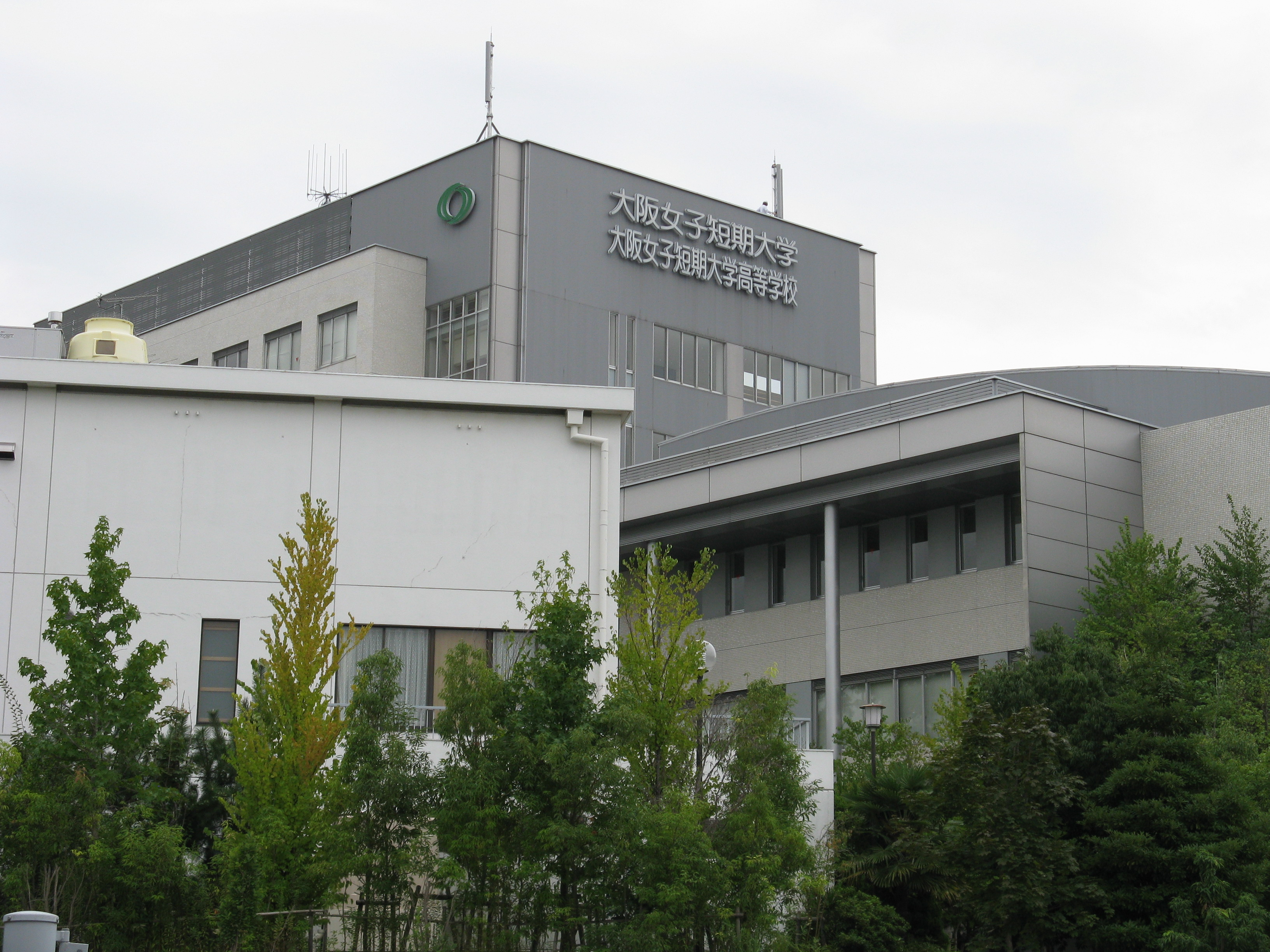
Osaka Women's Junior College

Osaka Women's Junior College (大阪女子短期大学, Ōsaka joshi tanki daigaku) was a private women's junior college in Fujiidera, Osaka, Japan. It was established in 1955. closed in 2018.
