= Takawashi Station =

Railway station in Habikino, Osaka Prefecture, Japan

Takawashi Station 高鷲駅
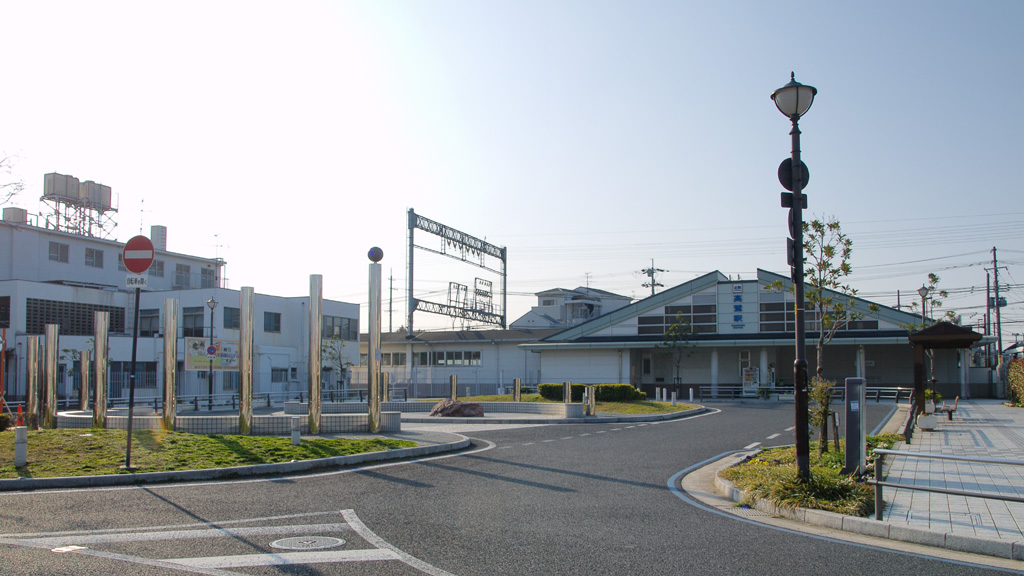
- Takawashi Station, March 2007

General information
- Location: 1-12, Takawashi 1-chōme, Habikino-shi, Osaka-fu 583-0882; Japan
- Coordinates: 34°34′18″N 135°35′03″E
- Operator: Kintetsu Railway
- Line: Minami Osaka Line
- Distance: 12.6 km (7.8 mi) from Ōsaka Abenobashi
- Platforms: 2 side platforms
- Connections

Other information
- Station code: F12
- Website: Official website

History
- Opened: April 18, 1922; 104 years ago

Passengers
- FY2019: 6647 daily
Location
- Location within Osaka Prefecture Location within Japan

Takawashi Station (高鷲駅, Takawashi-eki) is a passenger railway station in located in the city of Habikino, Osaka Prefecture, Japan, operated by the private railway operator Kintetsu Railway.

== Lines ==
Takawashi Station is served by the Minami Osaka Line, and is located 12.6 rail kilometers from the starting point of the line at Ōsaka Abenobashi Station.

== Station layout ==
The station consists of two opposed side platforms connected by an underground passage.

=== Platforms ===
1	■ Minami Osaka Line	for Fujiidera, Furuichi, Kashiharajingū-mae, Yoshino, and Kawachinagano
2	■ Minami Osaka Line	for Ōsaka Abenobashi

== Adjacent stations ==
«	Service	»
Minami Osaka Line
Eganoshō	Local	Fujiidera
Semi-Express: Does not stop at this station
Suburban Express: Does not stop at this station
Express: Does not stop at this station
Limited Express: Does not stop at this station

== History ==
Takawashi Station opened on April 18, 1922.

== Passenger statistics ==
In fiscal 2018, the station was used by an average of 6,647 passengers daily.

== Surrounding area ==
- Otsu Shrine
- Shimaizumi Maruyama Kofun
- Yoshimura Family Residence
- Habikino City Takawashi Kita Elementary School
- Habikino City Takawashi Elementary School

== See also ==
- List of railway stations in Japan
