= Matsubara =

Matsubara 松原市
- City
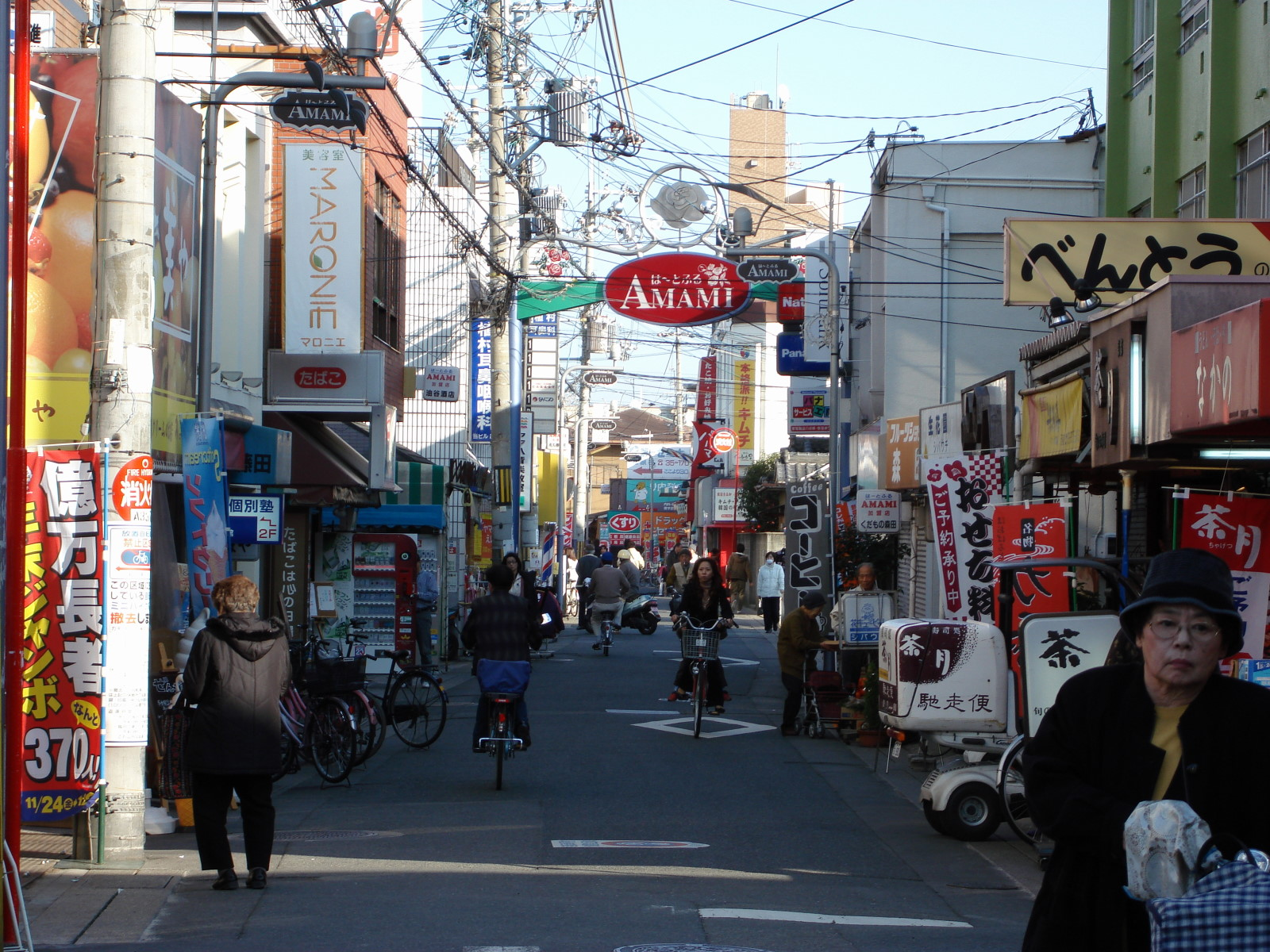
- Kawachiamami Street in Matsubara

- Flag Emblem

- Location of Matsubara in Osaka Prefecture

- Location in Japan
- Coordinates: 34°35′N 135°33′E
- Country: Japan
- Region: Kansai
- Prefecture: Osaka

Government
  - Mayor: Takanori Nakano

Area
  - Total: 16.66 km^{2} (6.43 sq mi)

Population (January 1, 2022)
  - Total: 117,811
  - Density: 7,071/km^{2} (18,320/sq mi)
- Time zone: UTC+09:00 (JST)
- City hall address: 1-1-1 Ao, Matsubara-shi, Ōsaka-fu 580-8501
- Website: Official website
- Symbols
- Flower: Rose (Bara)
- Tree: Pine (Matsu)

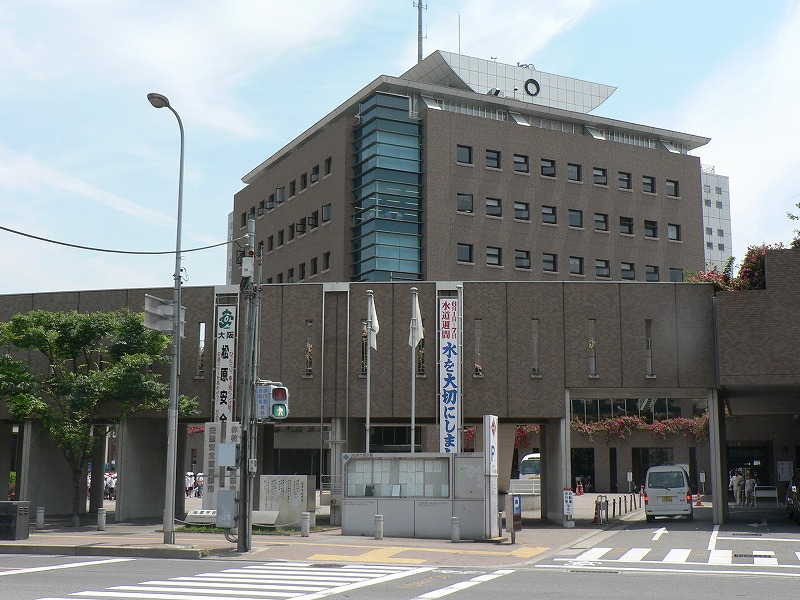
City office of Matsubara

Matsubara (松原市, Matsubara-shi) is a city located in Osaka Prefecture, Japan. As of 1 January 2022, the city had an estimated population of 117,811 in 57351 households and a population density of 7100 persons per km^{2}. The total area of the city is 16.66 square kilometres (6.43 sq mi).

== Geography ==
Matsubara is located in the center of Osaka Prefecture. The city measures approximately 5.8 kilometers east–west by 5.1 kilometers north–south, and is mostly flatland.

=== Neighboring municipalities ===
Osaka Prefecture

- Fujiidera
- Habikino
- Osaka (Sumiyoshi-ku, Higashi Sumiyoshi-ku, Hirano-ku)
- Sakai (Kita-ku, Mihara-ku)
- Yao

== Climate ==
Matsubara has a humid subtropical climate (Köppen Cfa) characterized by warm summers and cool winters with light to no snowfall. The average annual temperature in Matsubara is 14.9 °C. The average annual rainfall is 1475 mm with September as the wettest month. The temperatures are highest on average in August, at around 27.0 °C, and lowest in January, at around 3.5 °C.

== Demographics ==
Per Japanese census data, the population of Matsubara has increased rapidly in the 1960s and 1970s, and has since leveled off.

Historical population
Year	Pop.	±%
1960	46,834	—
1970	111,562	+138.2%
1980	135,849	+21.8%
1990	135,919	+0.1%
2000	132,562	−2.5%
2010	124,400	−6.2%

== History ==
The area of the modern city of Matsubara was within ancient Kawachi Province. Per the Kojiki and the Nihon Shoki, in the 5th century AD, Emperor Hanzei had a palace, Tajihi Shibagaki-no-Miya (丹比柴籬宮), in the area. During the Edo period, Matsubara was the administrative center of the Tannan Domain. The villages of Matsubara, Amami, Nunose, Miyake, and Ega were established within Tanboku District, Osaka with the creation of the modern municipalities system on April 1, 1889. Tannan District became part of Naka-Kawachi District on April 1, 1896. Matsubara was elevated to town status on July 1, 1942, followed by Amami on January 1, 1947. Matsubara and Amami merged with the villages of Nunose, Miyake, and Ega on February 1, 1950 to form the city of Matsubara.

== Government ==
Matsubara has a mayor-council form of government with a directly elected mayor and a unicameral city council of 18 members. Matsubara contributes one member to the Osaka Prefectural Assembly. In terms of national politics, the city is part of Osaka 15th district of the lower house of the Diet of Japan.

== Economy ==
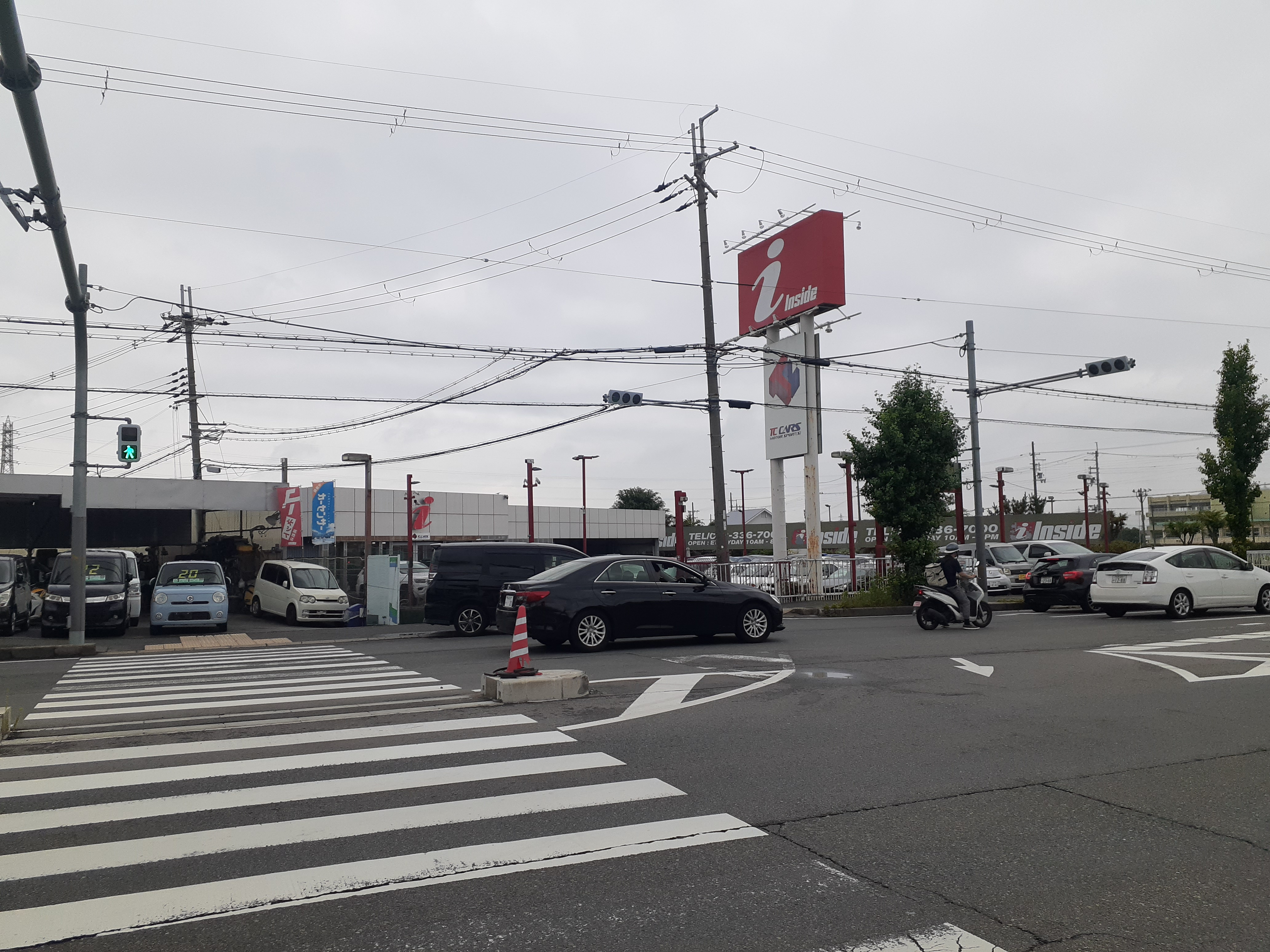
A used car dealer on the National Route 309 in Matsubara.

Matsubara was traditionally known for its production of hanko signature stamps. Modern industries are centered around the wire mesh industry. Due to its proximity to the large metropolis of Sakai and Osaka, ease of transportation and the development of large housing projects in the 1960s and 1970s, Matsubara has increasing evolved into a commuter town.

Youmenity Matsubara is a shopping mall located across the Kawachi-Matsubara Station.

There are many businesses such as restaurants and car dealers on the Japan National Route 309.

== Education ==
Matsubara has 15 public elementary schools and seven public middle schools operated by the city government and three public high schools operated by the Osaka Prefectural Department of Education. There is also one private high school. Hannan University is located in Matsubara. Hannan University is a mid-sized liberal arts university with a focus on business and technology.

== Transportation ==
=== Railway ===
Kintetsu Railway - Kintetsu Minami Osaka Line

- Kawachi-Amami - Nunose - Takaminosato - Kawachi-Matsubara

=== Highway ===
- Kinki Expressway
- Hanwa Expressway
- Nishi-Meihan Expressway
- Hanshin Expressway Route 14 Matsubara Route
- National Route 309
