= Hajinosato Station =

Railway station in Fujidera, Osaka Prefecture, Japan

Hajinosato Station 土師ノ里駅
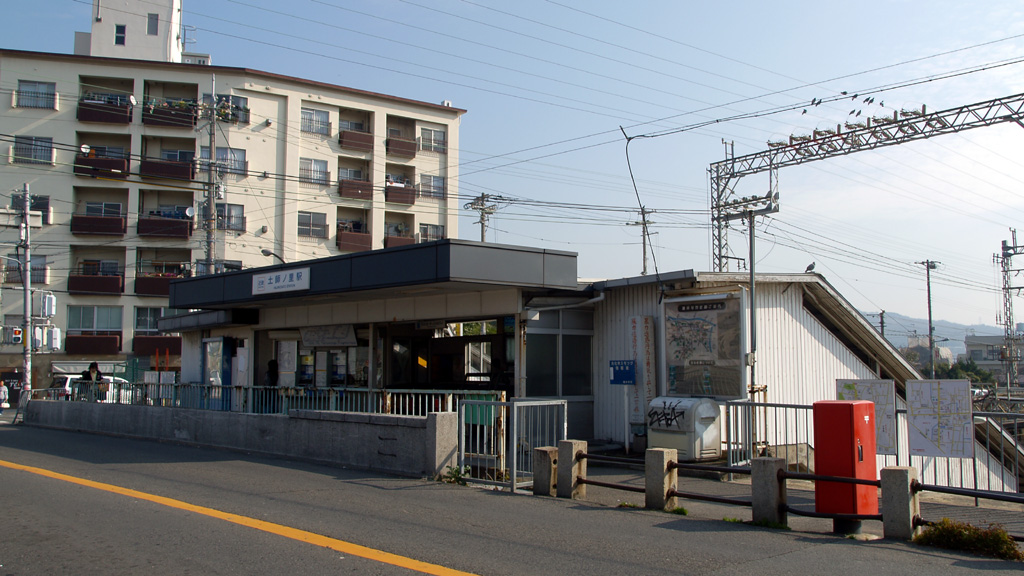
- Hajinosato Station, March 2007

General information
- Location: 1-28, Dōmyōji 1-chōme, Fujiidera-shi, Osaka-fu 583-0012; Japan
- Coordinates: 34°34′18″N 135°36′55″E
- Operator: Kintetsu Railway
- Line: Minami Osaka Line
- Distance: 15.6 km (9.7 mi) from Ōsaka Abenobashi
- Platforms: 2 side platforms
- Connections

Other information
- Station code: F14
- Website: Official website

History
- Opened: June 1, 1924; 102 years ago

Passengers
- FY2019: 7284 daily
Location
- Location within Osaka Prefecture Location within Japan

Hajinosato Station (土師ノ里駅, Hajinosato-eki) is a passenger railway station in located in the city of Fujiidera, Osaka Prefecture, Japan, operated by the private railway operator Kintetsu Railway.

== Lines ==
Hajinosato Station is served by the Minami Osaka Line, and is located 15.6 rail kilometers from the starting point of the line at Ōsaka Abenobashi Station.

== Station layout ==
The station consists of two opposed side platforms set in a cutting connected by an elevated station building.

=== Platforms ===
1	■ Minami-Osaka Line	for Furuichi, Kashiharajingu-mae, Yoshino, Kawachi-Nagano and Gose
2	■ Minami-Osaka Line	for Osaka Abenobashi

== Adjacent stations ==
«	Service	»
Minami Osaka Line
Fujiidera	Local	Dōmyōji
Fujiidera	Semi-Express	Dōmyōji
Suburban Express: Does not stop at this station
Express: Does not stop at this station
Limited Express: Does not stop at this station

== History ==
Hajinosato Station opened on June 1, 1924.

== Passenger statistics ==
In fiscal 2018, the station was used by an average of 7,284 passengers daily.

== Surrounding area ==
- Fujiidera City Domyoji Elementary School
- Fujiidera City Domyoji Junior High School
- Furuichi Kofun Cluster

== See also ==
- List of railway stations in Japan
