= Kizuri-Kamikita Station =

Railway station in Higashiōsaka, Osaka Prefecture, Japan

Kizuri-Kamikita Station 衣摺加美北駅
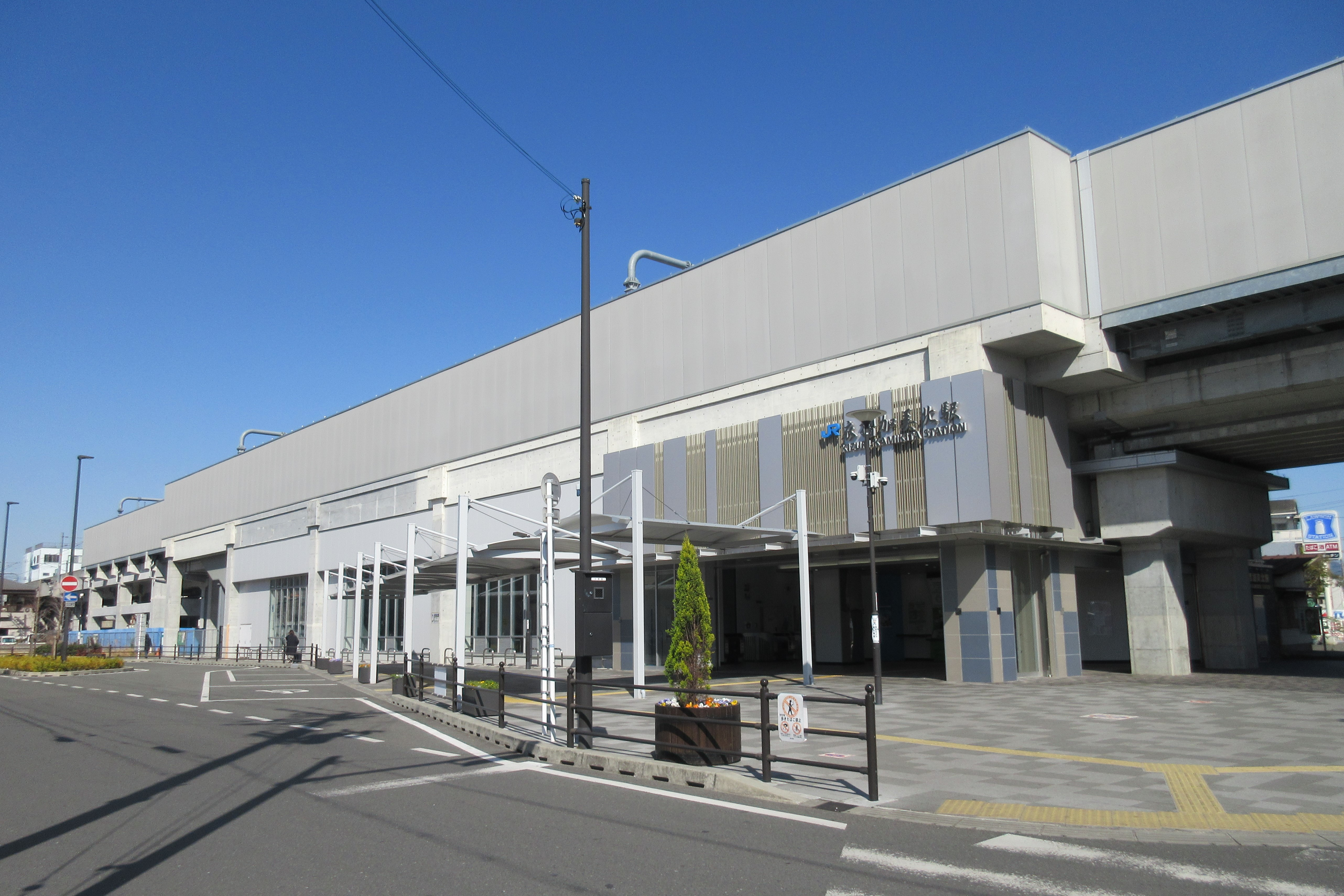
- Kizuri-Kamikita Station, March 2023

General information
- Location: 6-11 Kizuri, Higashiōsaka-shi, Osaka-fu 577-0827; Japan
- Coordinates: 34.6386°N 135.5671°E
- System: JR-West commuter rail station
- Owner: West Japan Railway Company
- Operator: West Japan Railway Company
- Line: F Osaka Higashi Line
- Distance: 6.2 km from Hanaten
- Platforms: 2 side platforms
- Tracks: 2

Construction
- Structure type: Elevated
- Cycle facilities: Yes
- Accessible: Lifts to each platform

Other information
- Status: Staffed
- Station code: JR-F13
- Website: Official website

History
- Opened: 17 March 2018

Passengers
- FY2019: 2416 daily
Location
- Location within Osaka Prefecture Location within Japan

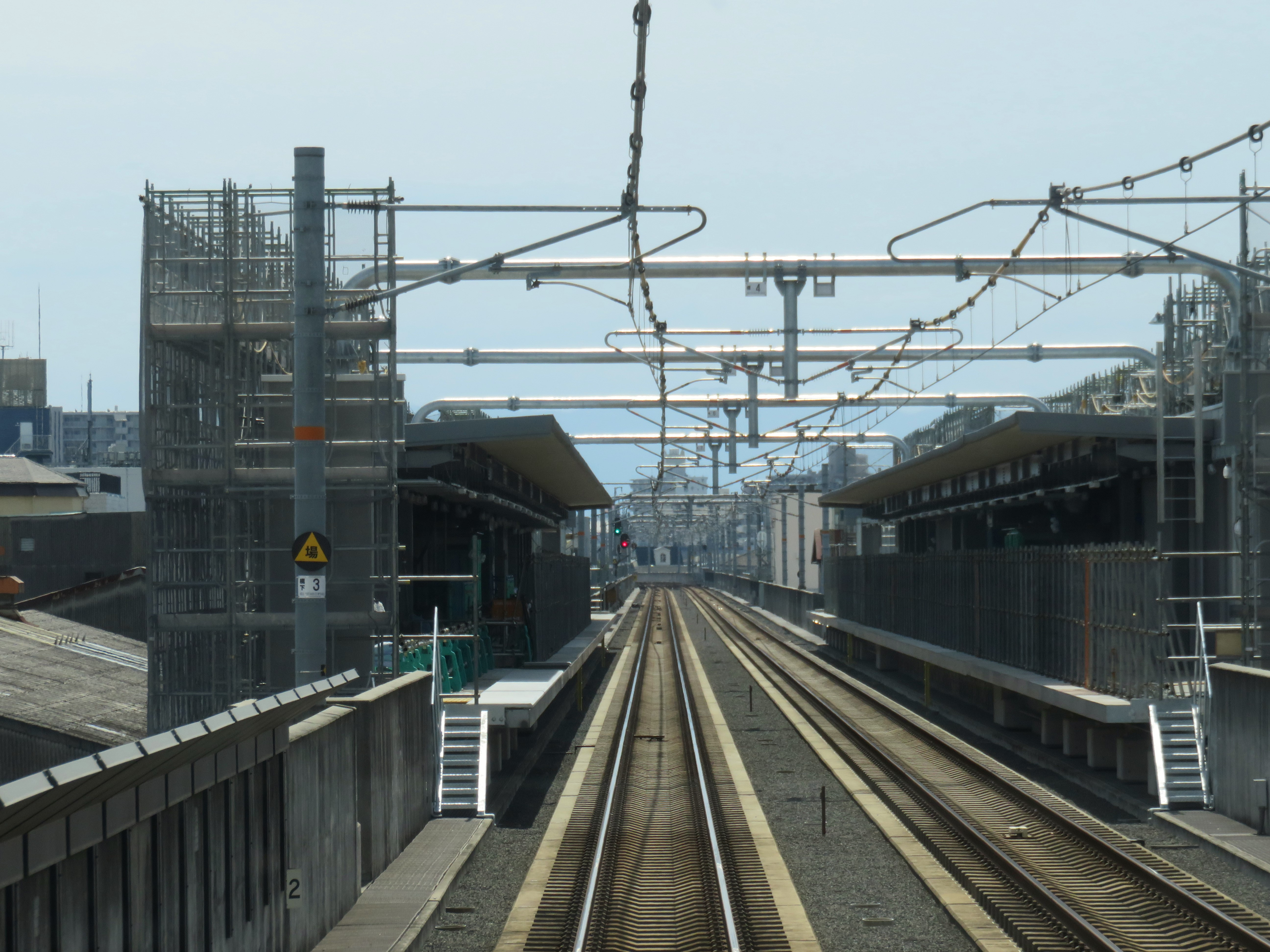
The platforms under construction in October 2017

Kizuri-Kamikita Station (衣摺加美北駅, Kizuri-Kamikita-eki) is a passenger railway station in located in the city of Higashiōsaka, Osaka Prefecture, Japan, operated by West Japan Railway Company (JR West).

== Lines ==
Kizuri-Kamikita Station is served by the 9.2 km (5.7 mi) Osaka Higashi Line from Hanaten to Kyūhōji, and is located 6.2 km (3.9 mi) from the starting point of the line at Hanaten (1.3 km (0.81 mi) from JR Nagase Station to the north, and 1.3 km (0.81 mi) from Shin-Kami Station to the south).

== Station layout ==
The station has two elevated side platforms, each capable of accommodating eight-car trains, with the station building underneath

== Platforms ==
1	■ F Osaka Higashi Line	for Hanaten and Shin-Osaka
2	■ F Osaka Higashi Line	for Kyūhōji

== Adjacent stations ==
«	Service	»
Osaka Higashi Line
Rapid: Does not stop at this station
JR Nagase	Local	Shin-Kami

== History ==
The name of the new station was announced by JR West on 26 September 2017. The station was opened on 17 March 2018 as an infill station as part of the Osaka Higashi Line project.

== Passenger statistics ==
The station is forecast to be used by approximately 4,500 passengers daily. In fiscal 2019, the station was used by an average of 2416 passengers daily (boarding passengers only).

== Surrounding area ==
The station is located close to the boundary between the city of Higashiōsaka and Hirano-ku, Osaka, and takes its name from the two areas it serves: Kizuri in Higashiosaka and Kamikita in Hirano-ku.

The following schools are located near the station.

- Kashita Junior High School
- Nagase Junior High School
- Higashiosaka Nagasenishi Elementary School
- Nagaseminami Elementary School
- Osaka Kamikita Elementary School

== See also ==
- List of railway stations in Japan
