= JR Nagase Station =

Railway station in Higashiōsaka, Osaka Prefecture, Japan

JR Nagase Station JR長瀬駅
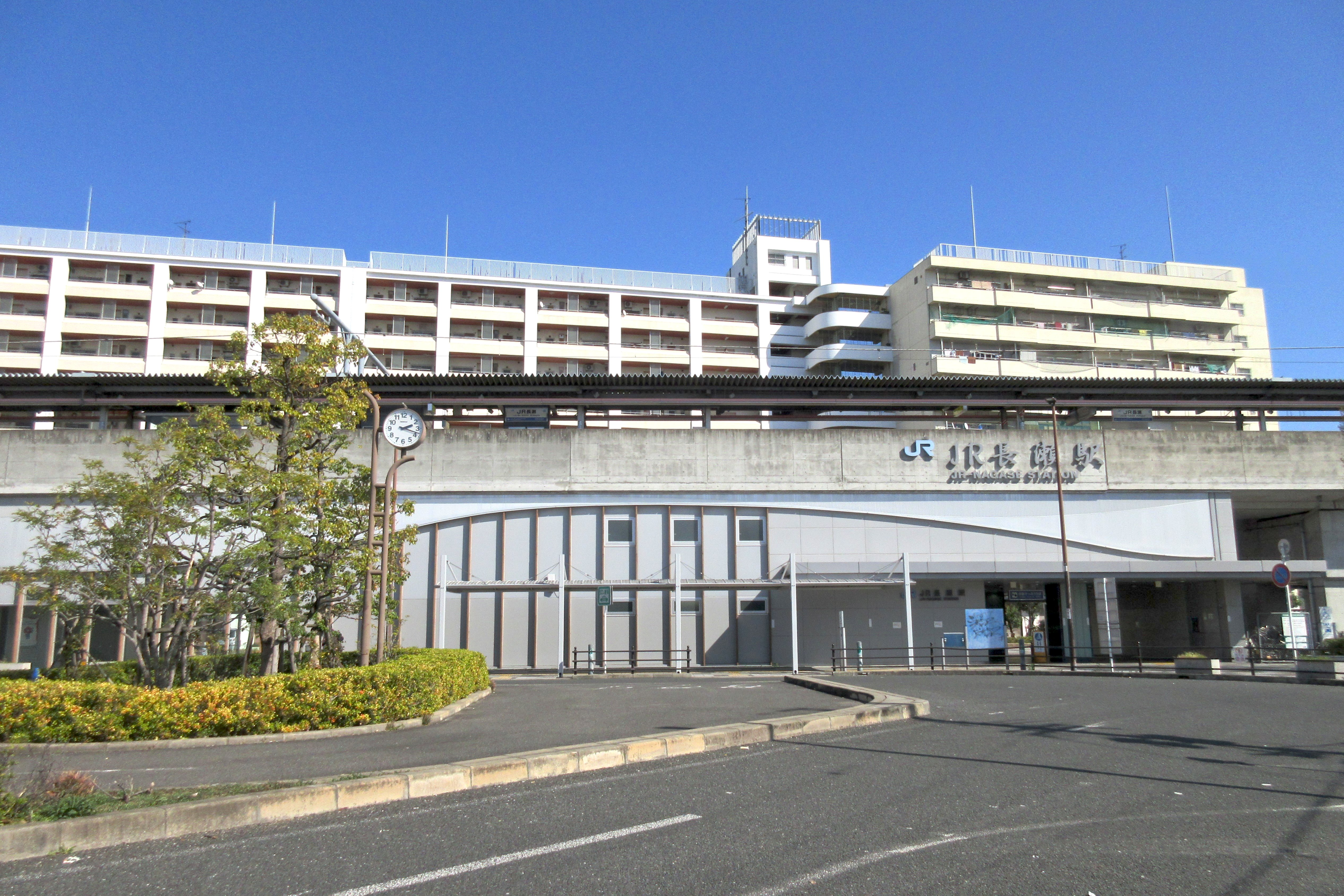
- JR Nagase Station, March 2023

General information
- Location: 3-8 Nagasechō, Higashiōsaka-shi, Osaka-fu 577-0832; Japan
- Coordinates: 34°38′58″N 135°34′13″E
- System: JR-West commuter rail station
- Owner: Osaka Soto-Kanjo Railway Co., Ltd.
- Operator: West Japan Railway Company
- Line: F Osaka Higashi Line
- Distance: 15.9 km from Shin-Osaka
- Platforms: 1 island platform

Construction
- Structure type: elevated

Other information
- Station code: JR-F12
- Website: Official website

History
- Opened: March 15, 2008

Passengers
- FY2019: 3282 daily
Location
- Location within Osaka Prefecture Location within Japan

JR Nagase Station (JR長瀬駅, JR Nagase-eki) is a passenger railway station in located in the city of Higashiōsaka, Osaka Prefecture, Japan, operated by West Japan Railway Company (JR West).

== Lines ==
JR Nagase Station is served by the Osaka Higashi Line, and is located 15.9 kilometers from Shin-Osaka Station.

== Station layout ==
The station has one island platform, capable of accommodating eight-car trains, with the station building underneath. The station is staffed.

=== Platforms ===
1	■ F Osaka Higashi Line	for Hanaten and Shin-Osaka
2	■ F Osaka Higashi Line	for Kyūhōji

== Adjacent stations ==
«	Service	»
Osaka Higashi Line
JR Shuntokumichi	Local	Kizuri-Kamikita
Direct Rapid Service: Does not stop at this station

- Shogakuji Signal Box is located between this station and Shin-Kami Station, and the signal box connects to Kudara Kamotsu Terminal via the Kansai Line Freight Branch.

== History ==
The station was initially planned under the provisional name Kashida Station (柏田駅, Kashida-eki). JR West preferred Nagase, a widely known place name, for the definite station name rather than obscure Kashida, but since there is a separate Nagase Station on Kintetsu Osaka Line, the station was finally named JR Nagase.

- 23 August 2007 – Press release by JR West of the determination of the station name as JR Nagase
- 15 March 2008 – Opening of the station

== Passenger statistics ==
In fiscal 2019, the station was used by an average of 3282 passengers daily (boarding passengers only).

== Surrounding area ==
- Higashi Osaka City Kashita Elementary School
- Higashi Osaka City Nagase Nishi Elementary School
- Higashi Osaka City Taiheiji Elementary School
- Higashi Osaka City Kashiwada Junior High School

== See also ==
- List of railway stations in Japan
