= Nagase =

Nagase (written: 永瀬, 長瀬, 長勢) is a Japanese surname. Notable people with the surname include:

- Anna Nagase (永瀬 アンナ; born 2005), Japanese voice actress
- Ayaka Nagase (長瀬 彩華; better known as Kim Chae-hwa, born 1988), South Korean former figure skater
- Jinen Nagase (長勢 甚遠; born 1943), Japanese politician
- Nagase Masaki (長瀬 真幸; 1765–1835), Japanese scholar
- Masatoshi Nagase (永瀬 正敏; born 1966), Japanese actor
- Mitsuru Nagase (永瀬 充; born 1976), Japanese ice sledge hockey player
- Miyu Nagase (長瀬 実夕; born 1988), Japanese musician
- Ren Nagase (永瀬 廉; born 1999), Japanese singer, member of King & Prince
- Takanori Nagase (永瀬 貴規; born 1993), Japanese judoka
- Takashi Nagase (永瀬 隆; 1918–2011), Japanese military interpreter during World War II
- Takuya Nagase (永瀬 拓矢; born 1992), Japanese professional shogi player
- Tasuku Nagase (永瀬 匡; born 1993), Japanese actor and model
- Tomoya Nagase (長瀬 智也; born 1978), Japanese singer-songwriter, actor, model
- Yuka Nagase (長瀬 有花), Japanese singer and virtual YouTuber

== Fictional characters ==
- Nagase, character in The King of Fighters series universe.
- Reiko Nagase, character in the Ridge Racer series
- Kaede Nagase, character in the Negima! Magister Negi Magi series
- Kei Nagase, character in the Ace Combat series
- Yusuki Nagase, character in the To Heart series
- Daisuke Nagase, character in the Persona 4 and Persona 4 Golden video games
- Nagisa Nagase, character in Shonan Junai Gumi and Great Teacher Onizuka

== See also ==
- Nagase Station, a railway station in Higashiosaka
- JR Nagase Station, a railway station in Higashiosaka
- Bushū-Nagase Station (武州長瀬駅, Bushū-nagase-eki), is a railway station operated by Tōbu Railway located in Moroyama, Saitama
- Kita-Nagase Station (北長瀬駅, Kitanagase-eki), a train station in Okayama, Okayama Prefecture
