= Minami-Suita Station =

Railway station in Suita, Osaka Prefecture, Japan

Minami-Suita Station 南吹田駅
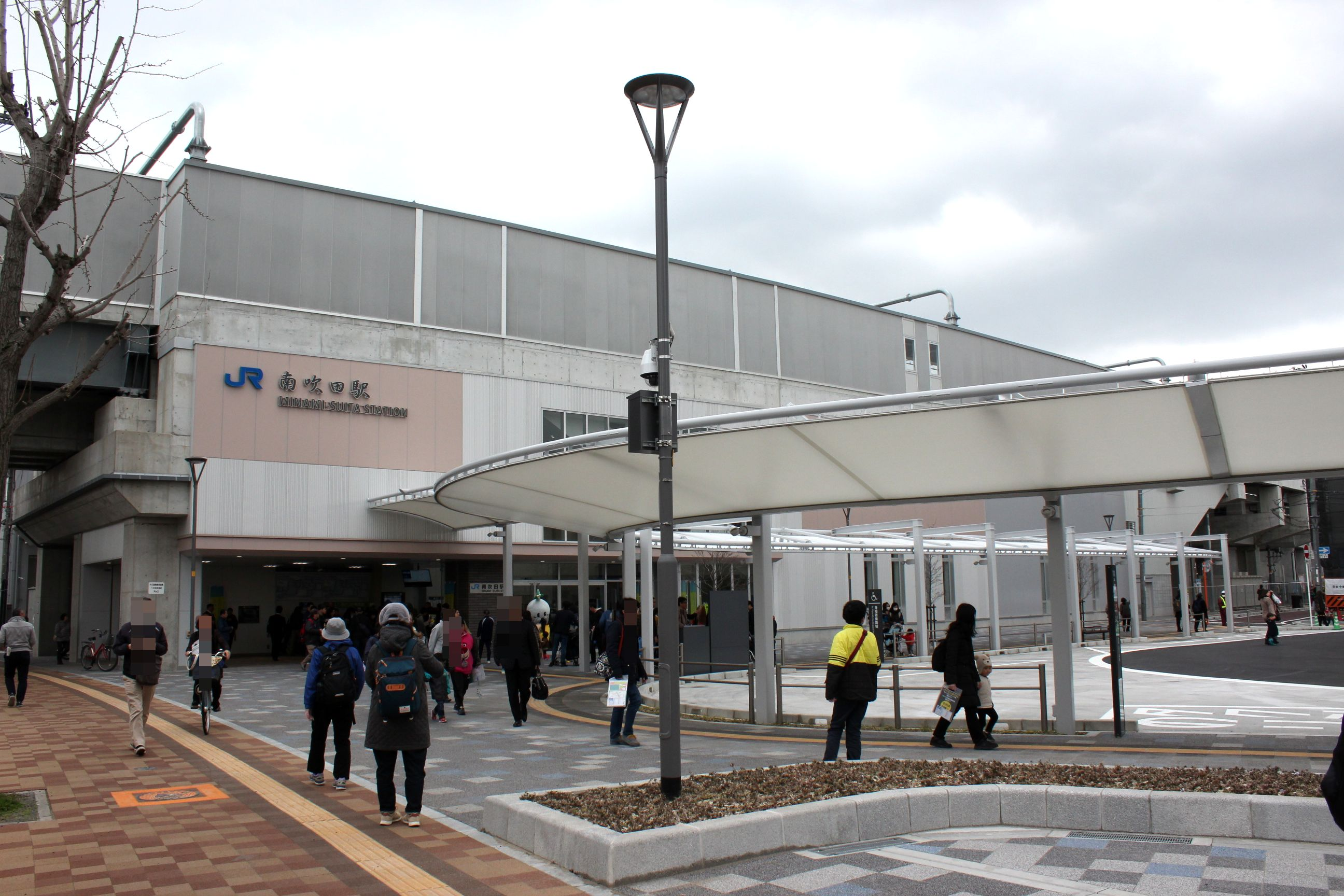
- Minami-Suita Station, March 2019

General information
- Location: 2 Minami-suita, Suita-shi, Osaka-fu 564-0043; Japan
- Coordinates: 34°44′58.0″N 135°30′40.5″E
- Operator: JR West
- Line: F Osaka Higashi Line)
- Distance: 2.0 km (1.2 mi) from Shin-Osaka
- Platforms: 2 side platforms

Construction
- Structure type: Ground level
- Accessible: Yes

Other information
- Status: Staffed
- Station code: JR-F03
- Website: Official website

History
- Opened: 16 March 2019

Passengers
- FY2019: 2371 daily

Services
Preceding station	JR West	Following station
Shin-Ōsaka Terminus	Osaka Higashi Line Local	JR-Awaji towards Kyūhōji
Location
- Location within Osaka Prefecture Location within Kansai region Location within Japan

Minami-Suita Station (南吹田駅, Minami-Suita-eki) is a passenger railway station located in the city of Suita, Osaka Prefecture, Japan. It is operated by the West Japan Railway Company (JR West). I

== Lines ==
Minami-Suita Station is served by the Osaka Higashi Line, and is 2.0 kilometers from the starting point of the line at Shin-Osaka and 5.8 kilometers from Osaka.

== Start Layout ==
The station has two elevated side platforms with the station facilities underneath. Each platform is capable of accommodating eight-car trains. The station is staffed.

=== Platforms ===
1	■ F Osaka Higashi Line	for Osaka and Osaka
2	■ F Osaka Higashi Line	for Hanaten and Kyūhōji

== History ==
The station was opened on 16 March 2019 with the opening of the Osaka Higashi Line.

== Passenger statistics ==
In fiscal 2019, the station was used by an average of 2371 passengers daily (boarding passengers only).

== Surrounding area ==
- Kanzaki River
- Osaka Municipal High-speed Electric Tramway Esaka Station
- Tokaido Main Line (JR Kyoto Line) Higashiyodogawa Station
- Suita Municipal Suita 6th Elementary School
- Suita Minami Elementary School

== See also ==
- List of railway stations in Japan
