= Shin-Kami Station =

Railway station in Osaka, Japan

Coordinates: 34°37′37″N 135°34′6″E

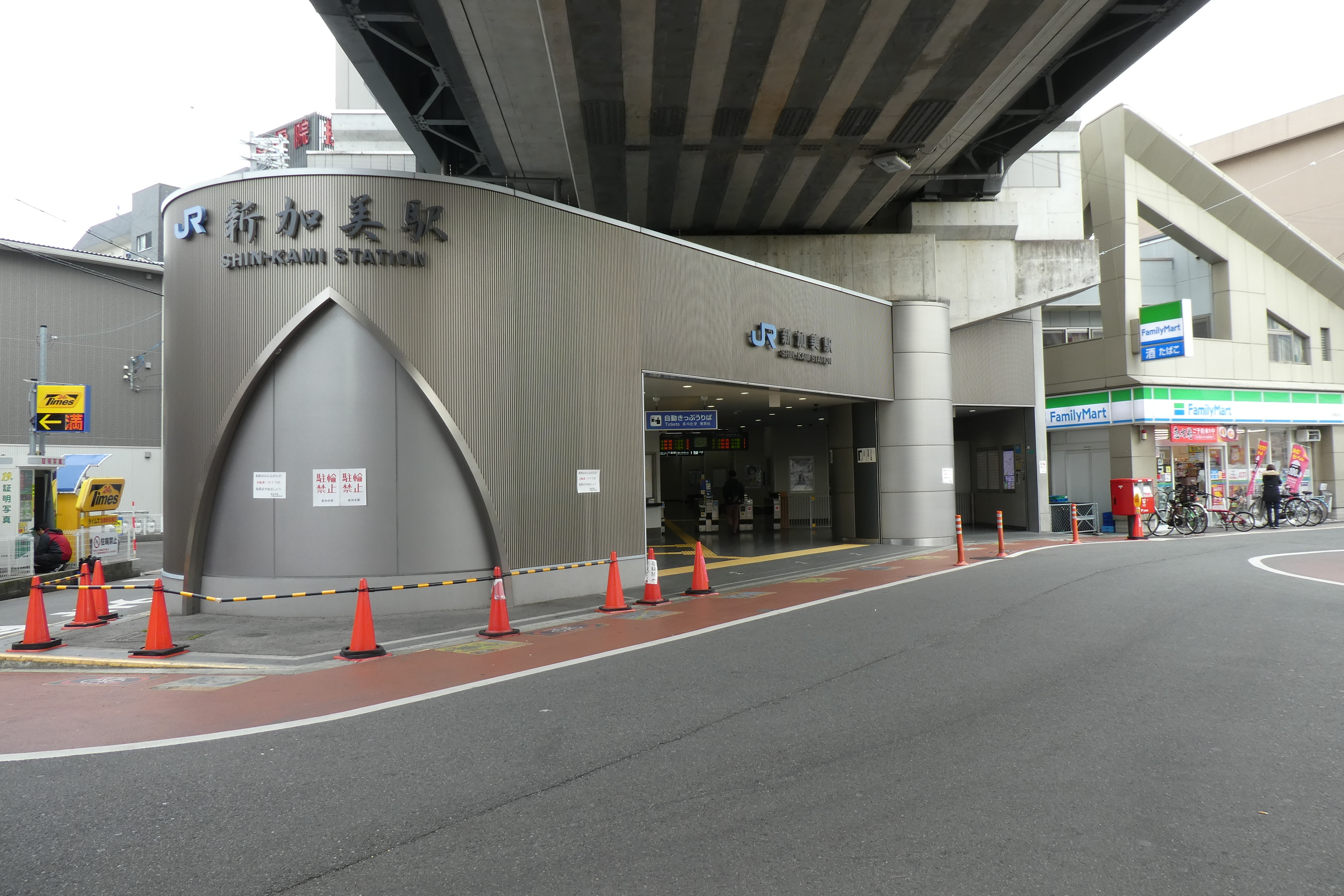
train station in 2020

Shin-Kami Station (新加美駅, Shin-Kami-eki) is a railway station on the West Japan Railway Company (JR West) Osaka Higashi Line in Hirano-ku, Osaka Prefecture, Japan. The station is not treated as "a station in Osaka City (大阪市内の駅)" for JR tickets.

Although they are only 150 metres (490 ft) apart, Kami Station and Shin-Kami Station are not regarded as interchange stations.

== Layout ==
There are two side platforms with two tracks elevated.

1	■ Osaka Higashi Line	for Hanaten
2	■ Osaka Higashi Line	to Kyūhōji

== History ==
The station was initially planned under the provisional name Kami Station (加美駅, Kami-eki). However, since there is a separate Kami Station on the Yamatoji Line, the definite name Shin-Kami was assigned.

- August 23, 2007 – Press release by JR West of the determination of the station name as Shin-Kami
- March 15, 2008 – Opening of the station

== Adjacent stations ==
«	Service	»
Osaka Higashi Line
Kizuri-Kamikita	Local	Kyuhoji
Direct Rapid Service: Does not stop at this station
