= JR-Kawachi-Eiwa Station =

Railway station in Higashiōsaka, Osaka Prefecture, Japan

JR-Kawachi-Eiwa Station JR河内永和駅
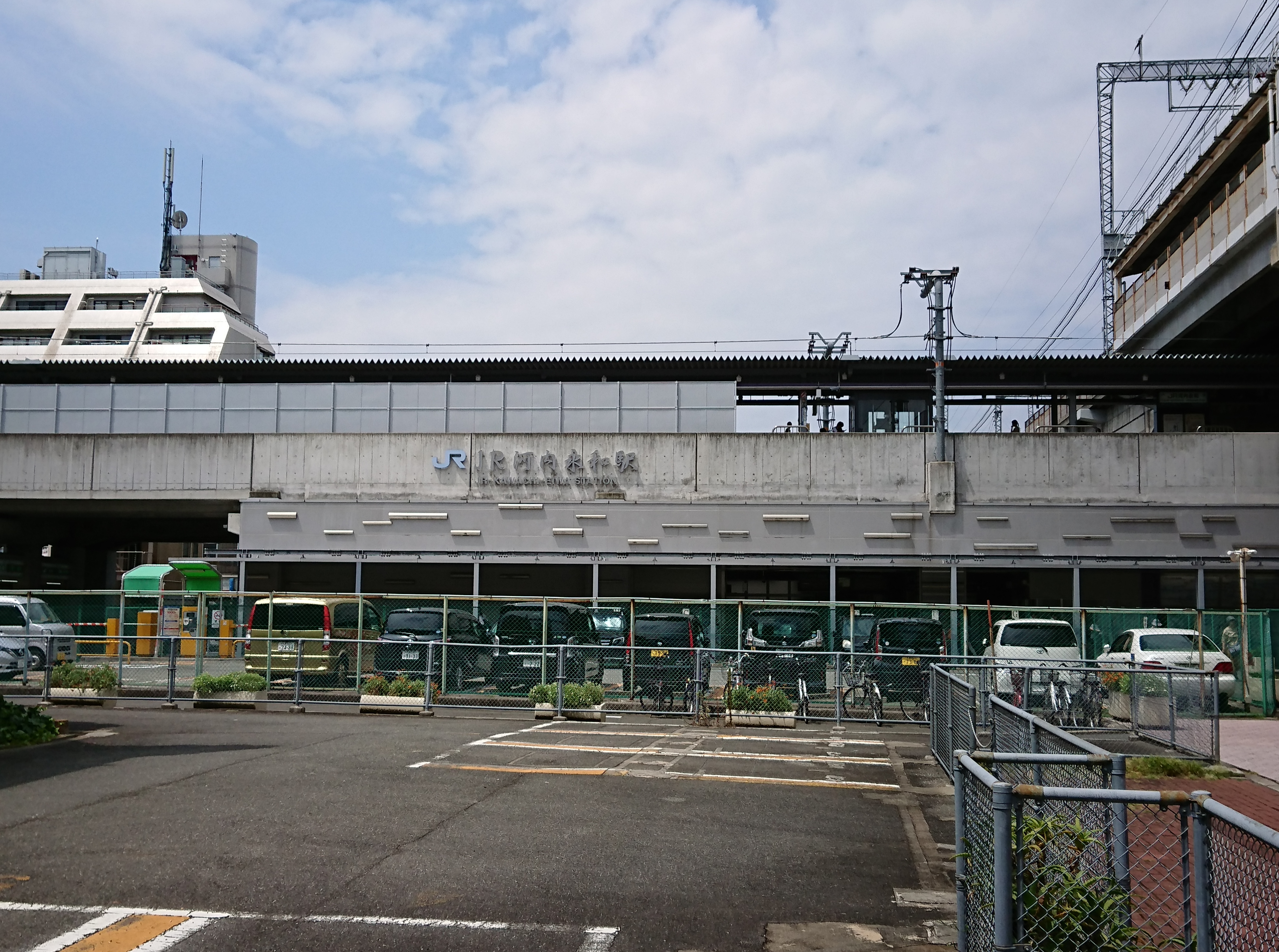
- JR-Kawachi-Eiwa Station, August 2019

General information
- Location: 1-24-15 Eiwa, Higashiōsaka-shi, Osaka-fu 577-0832; Japan
- Coordinates: 34°39′51″N 135°34′20″E
- System: JR-West commuter rail station
- Owner: Osaka Soto-Kanjo Railway Co., Ltd.
- Operator: West Japan Railway Company
- Line: F Osaka Higashi Line
- Distance: 14.3 km from Shin-Osaka
- Platforms: 1 island platform

Construction
- Structure type: elevated

Other information
- Station code: JR-F10
- Website: Official website

History
- Opened: March 15, 2008

Passengers
- FY2019: 8,629 daily
Location
- Location within Osaka Prefecture Location within Japan

JR-Kawachi-Eiwa Station (JR河内永和駅, JR Kawachi-Eiwa-eki) is a passenger railway station in located in the city of Higashiōsaka, Osaka Prefecture, Japan, operated by West Japan Railway Company (JR West).

== Lines ==
JR-Kawachi-Eiwa Station is served by the Osaka Higashi Line, and is located 14.3 kilometers from Shin-Osaka Station.

== Station layout ==
The station has one elevated island platform, capable of accommodating eight-car trains, with the station building underneath. The station is staffed.

=== Platforms ===
1	■ F Osaka Higashi Line	for Hanaten and Shin-Osaka
2	■ F Osaka Higashi Line	for Kyūhōji

== Adjacent stations ==
«	Service	»
JR West Osaka Higashi Line (JR Kawachi-Eiwa)
Takaida-Chūō	Local	JR Shuntokumichi
Takaida-Chūō	Direct Rapid Service	Kyūhōji

== History ==
The station was opened on March 15, 2008.

== Passenger statistics ==
In fiscal 2019, the station was used by an average of 8,629 passengers daily (boarding passengers only).

== Surrounding area ==
- Kintetsu Kawachi-Eiwa Station
- Higashi Osaka Tax Office
- Higashi Osaka Pension Office
- Higashi Osaka Simple Court
- Higashi Osaka Chamber of Commerce

== See also ==
- List of railway stations in Japan
