= Kami Station =

Railway station in Osaka, Japan

Kami Station 加美駅
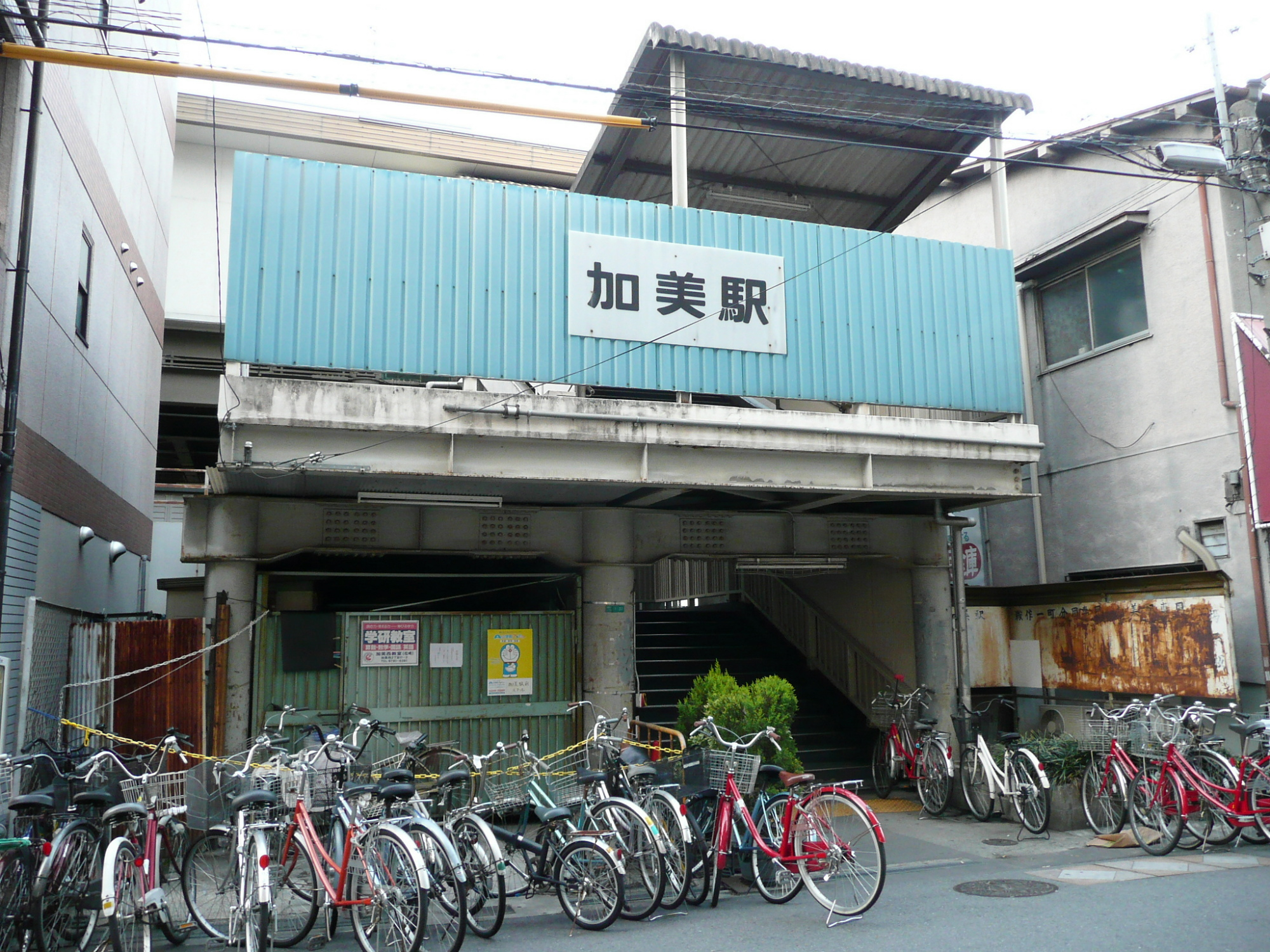
- South entrance

General information
- Location: Japan
- Coordinates: 34°37′36.6″N 135°34′2.1″E
- Operator: West Japan Railway Company (JR West)
- Line: Kansai Main Line (Yamatoji Line)
- Tracks: 2
- Connections: Bus terminal

Construction
- Structure type: Ground level
- Accessible: Yes

History
- Opened: 1909

Services
Preceding station	JR West	Following station
Hirano towards JR Namba	Yamatoji Line Local	Kyūhōji towards Kamo
Location

Kami Station (加美駅, Kami-eki) is a train station on the West Japan Railway Company (JR West) Yamatoji Line (Kansai Main Line electrified section) in Hirano-ku, Osaka, Osaka Prefecture, Japan. However, there is no connection with Shin-Kami Station on the Osaka Higashi Line.

== Line ==
- West Japan Railway Company (JR West) Yamatoji Line

== Layout ==
- There are two side platforms with two tracks on the ground. Station building is located over the platforms and the tracks.

1	■ Yamatoji Line	for Kyuhoji, Oji and Nara
2	■ Yamatoji Line	for Tennoji and JR Namba

== History ==
Station numbering was introduced in March 2018 with Kami being assigned station number JR-Q23.
