= Yamatoji Line =

Railway line in Japan

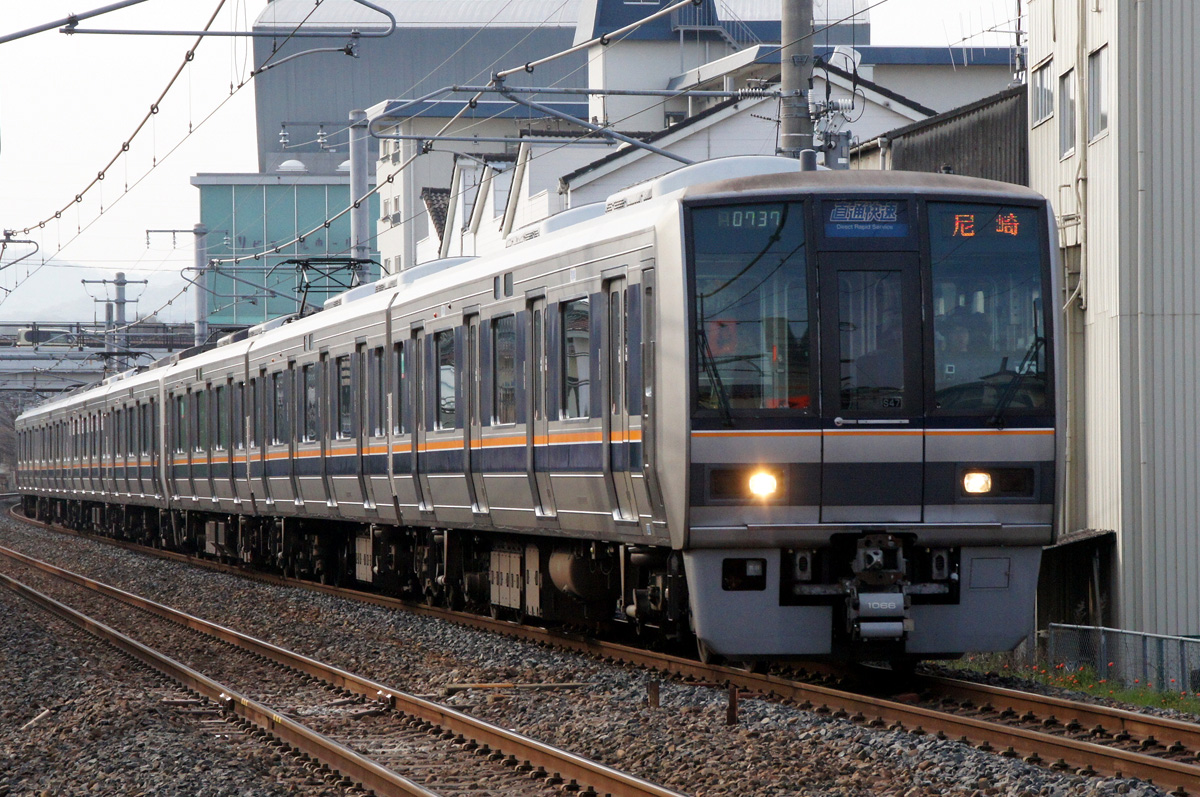
- 207 series EMU on a Yamatoji Line Direct Rapid Service

Overview
- Native name: 大和路線
- Owner: JR West
- Locale: Kansai (Kyoto, Nara, Osaka prefectures)
- Termini: Kamo; JR Namba
- Stations: 22

Service
- Type: Heavy rail
- System: Urban Network
- Depot: Nara Depot
- Rolling stock: 201 series EMU; 221 series EMU; 207 series EMU (Kizu–Nara); 321 series EMU (Kizu–Nara)

History
- Opened: 1889; 137 years ago

Technical
- Line length: 54.0 km (33.6 mi)
- Number of tracks: 2
- Track gauge: 1,067 mm (3 ft 6 in)
- Electrification: 1,500 V DC (overhead lines)
- Operating speed: 120 km/h (75 mph) (Nara–Tennoji); 95 km/h (59 mph) (Kamo–Nara, Tennoji–JR Namba)

The Yamatoji Line (大和路線, Yamatoji-sen) is the common name of the western portion of the Kansai Main Line in Japan. The line is owned and operated by West Japan Railway Company (JR West). It starts at Kamo Station in Kyoto Prefecture and ends at JR Namba Station in Naniwa-ku, Osaka.

== Operations ==
=== Yamatoji Rapid Service ===
Yamatoji Rapid Service (大和路快速, Yamatoji Kaisoku) trains operate between Kamo or Nara Station and Tennoji, via a complete loop on the Osaka Loop Line. Trains divert from the Kansai Line at Shin-Imamiya Station instead of continuing to JR Namba. From Shin-Imamiya, they run on the Osaka Loop Line, making limited stops to Osaka Station, and then making every stop before completing the loop at Tennoji Station. However, some services do not complete the loop, as they terminate in Kyobashi. Trains also stop at every station east of Ōji.
4 services are operated every hour during weekday daytime and weekend nighttime, with 2 of them operating as far as Kamo. Some weekend services operate through service to the Wakayama Line towards Takada and Gojō.
All trains are operated by 8-car 221 series EMUs.

=== Regional Rapid Service ===
Regional Rapid Service (区間快速, Kukan Kaisoku) operate the same route as the Yamatoji Rapid but make every stop on the Osaka Loop Line. They are operated in weekday rush hours, plus weekend nights. There are also services which operate through services to the Wakayama Line. All services are operated using 221 series EMUs.

=== Rapid Service ===
Rapid Service (快速, Kaisoku)" operate between JR Namba and either Takada on the Wakayama Line (daytime), or Nara / Kamo (morning, evening, night), with an interval of 2 trains per hour. Among the through trains towards the Wakayama Line during the evening rush, some of them are coupled with Nara-bound services before decoupling at Ōji. However there are no Namba-bound services where two trains couple at Ōji. Additionally, there are a few Namba-bound through service trains starting from Nara and detours to the Sakurai Line in the morning rush.
Trains stop at JR Namba, Shin-Imamiya, Tennoji, Kyūhōji, Ōji and every station after Ōji.
During daytime, trains are operated using 4-car 221 series EMUs. During rush hours, 6-car 201 series EMUs are also used, but now there is a higher tendency that 221 series trains being used. From the timetable revision on 15 March 2008 until 11 March 2022, 3 Rapid services starting from Kashiwara (where Rapid trains normally skip) to Namba were operated.
Direct Rapid Service (直通快速, Chokutsū Kaisoku)
The operation of the "Direct Rapid Service" trains started on March 17, 2008, with the opening of the Osaka Higashi Line and the timetable revision on March 15, 2008. The trains are now operated between Nara and Shin-Osaka, via the Yamatoji Line and the Osaka Higashi Line. On weekdays, 4 Shin-Osaka-bound trains are operated in the mornings, while 4 Nara-bound trains are operated in the evenings. On weekends, 2 round trips are operated both in the mornings and in the evenings. Trains stop at all stations from Nara to Ōji, Kyūhōji, JR Kawachi-Eiwa, Takaida-Chuo, Hanaten and Shin-Osaka. Trains are operated using 207 series or 321 series EMUs from the Aboshi Depot.
Before 16 March 2019, when the Osaka Higashi Line still had not been extended to Shin-Osaka, Direct Rapid trains operated between Nara and Amagasaki via the Yamatoji Line, the Osaka Higashi Line, the Katamachi Line (Gakkentoshi Line), and the JR Tōzai Line.
Local (普通, Futsū)
"Local trains" stop at every station on the Yamatoji Line between Kamo and JR Namba. They are operated between Oji and JR Namba in the non-rush hour. Trains are also operated from JR Namba to Kamo and through from JR Namba to the Nara Line in the early morning.

== History ==
The oldest section of the Yamatoji Line is between Kashiwara and JR Namba, which opened on May 14, 1889. The present route was completed on August 21, 1907 when the new line between Kamo and Kizu, replacing the original route via Daibutsu, was opened. The name "Yamatoji Line" has been used since March 13, 1988, and the term “Yamatoji“ roughly translates to “Road to Yamato Province”.

Station numbering was introduced in March 2018 with the Yamatoji Line being assigned station numbers between JR-Q17 and JR-Q39 with the exception of JR-Q35 (which will be assigned to a future station between Koriyama and Nara).

== Stations ==
- ● : All trains stop.
- | : All trains pass.

Local trains stop at every passenger station.

| No. | Station name | | Regional Rapid | Direct Rapid | Rapid | Yamatoji Rapid | Transfers | Location | |
|---|---|---|---|---|---|---|---|---|---|
| JR-Q39 | Kamo | 加茂 | ● | | ● | ● | Kansai Main Line (for Kameyama) | Kizugawa | Kyoto; Prefecture |
| JR-Q38 | Kizu | 木津 | ● | | ● | ● | Katamachi Line (Gakkentoshi Line); Nara Line | Kizugawa | Kyoto; Prefecture |
| JR-Q37 | Narayama | 平城山 | ● | | ● | ● | | Nara | Nara; Prefecture |
| JR-Q36 | Nara | 奈良 | ● | ● | ● | ● | Nara Line; Sakurai Line (Man-yō Mahoroba Line) | Nara | Nara; Prefecture |
| JR-Q35 | TBD | | | | | | Planned | | Nara; Prefecture |
| JR-Q34 | Kōriyama | 郡山 | ● | ● | ● | ● | | Yamatokōriyama | Nara; Prefecture |
| JR-Q33 | Yamato-Koizumi | 大和小泉 | ● | ● | ● | ● | | Yamatokōriyama | Nara; Prefecture |
| JR-Q32 | Hōryūji | 法隆寺 | ● | ● | ● | ● | | Ikaruga, Ikoma District | Nara; Prefecture |
Through service from/to Wakayama Line Through service from Sakurai Line via Wakayama Line
| JR-Q31 | Ōji | 王寺 | ● | ● | ● | ● | Wakayama Line; G Kintetsu Ikoma Line; I Kintetsu Tawaramoto Line (Shin-Ōji Station) | Ōji, Kitakatsuragi District | Nara; Prefecture |
| JR-Q30 | Sangō | 三郷 | | | | | | | | | | Sangō, Ikoma District | Nara; Prefecture |
| JR-Q29 | Kawachi-Katakami | 河内堅上 | | | | | | | | | | Kashiwara | Osaka; Prefecture |
| JR-Q28 | Takaida | 高井田 | | | | | | | | | | Kashiwara | Osaka; Prefecture |
| JR-Q27 | Kashiwara | 柏原 | | | | | | | | | N Kintetsu Domyoji Line; D Kintetsu Osaka Line (Katashimo Station) | Kashiwara | Osaka; Prefecture |
| JR-Q26 | Shiki | 志紀 | | | | | | | | | | Yao | Osaka; Prefecture |
| JR-Q25 | Yao | 八尾 | | | | | | | | | | Yao | Osaka; Prefecture |
| JR-Q24 | Kyūhōji | 久宝寺 | ● | ● | ● | ● | Osaka Higashi Line | Yao | Osaka; Prefecture |
| JR-Q23 | Kami | 加美 | | | | | | | | | Hirano-ku, Osaka | Osaka; Prefecture |
| JR-Q22 | Hirano | 平野 | | | | | | | | | Hirano-ku, Osaka | Osaka; Prefecture |
| JR-Q21 | Tōbu-shijō-mae | 東部市場前 | | | | | | | | | Higashisumiyoshi-ku, Osaka | Osaka; Prefecture |
| JR-Q20 | Tennōji | 天王寺 | ● | | ● | ● | Osaka Loop Line; Hanwa Line; Osaka Metro Midōsuji Line, Tanimachi Line; F Kintetsu Minami Osaka Line (Osaka Abenobashi Station); Hankai Uemachi Line (Tennoji-eki-mae Station) | Tennoji-ku, Osaka | Osaka; Prefecture |
| JR-Q19 | Shin-Imamiya | 新今宮 | ● | | ● | ● | Osaka Loop Line; Nankai Main Line, Nankai Kōya Line; Osaka Metro: Midōsuji Line (Dōbutsuen-mae Station), Sakaisuji Line (Dōbutsuen-mae Station); Hankai Line (Shin-Imamiya-Ekimae Station) | Naniwa-ku, Osaka | Osaka; Prefecture |
| JR-Q18 | Imamiya | 今宮 | ● | | | | | | Osaka Loop Line | Naniwa-ku, Osaka | Osaka; Prefecture |
| JR-Q17 | JR Namba | JR難波 | | | ● | | A Kintetsu Namba Line (Osaka Namba Station); Hanshin Namba Line (Osaka Namba Station); Nankai Main Line, Koya Line (Namba Station); Osaka Metro: Midōsuji Line (Namba Station), Yotsubashi Line (Namba Station), Sennichimae Line (Namba Station) | Naniwa-ku, Osaka | Osaka; Prefecture |
Yamatoji Rapid, Regional Rapid: Through service from/to Osaka Loop Line Direct Rapid: Through service from/to Osaka Higashi Line

A 201 series train pulling out of a train station, 2013.

== Rolling stock ==
- 207 series
- 221 series (Yamatoji Rapid, Direct Rapid, Rapid and Local services)
- 287 series (Rakuraku Yamato services)
- 321 series

=== Former ===
- 103 series (until 2018)
- 105 series (until 1994)
- 113 series (until July 1989)
- 117 series
- 201 series (Rapid and Local services, until March 2025 )
- 205 series (until March 2022)
- 223-0/2500 series (Kansai Airport/Kishuji Rapid service, until March 2008)
- 223-6000 series (Direct Rapid service, until March 2011)
- 381 series (Yamatoji Liner Rapid service, until March 2011)
