= Shirokitakōendōri Station =

Railway station in Osaka, Japan

Coordinates: 34°43′15″N 135°31′58″E

Shirokitakōendōri Station 城北公園通駅
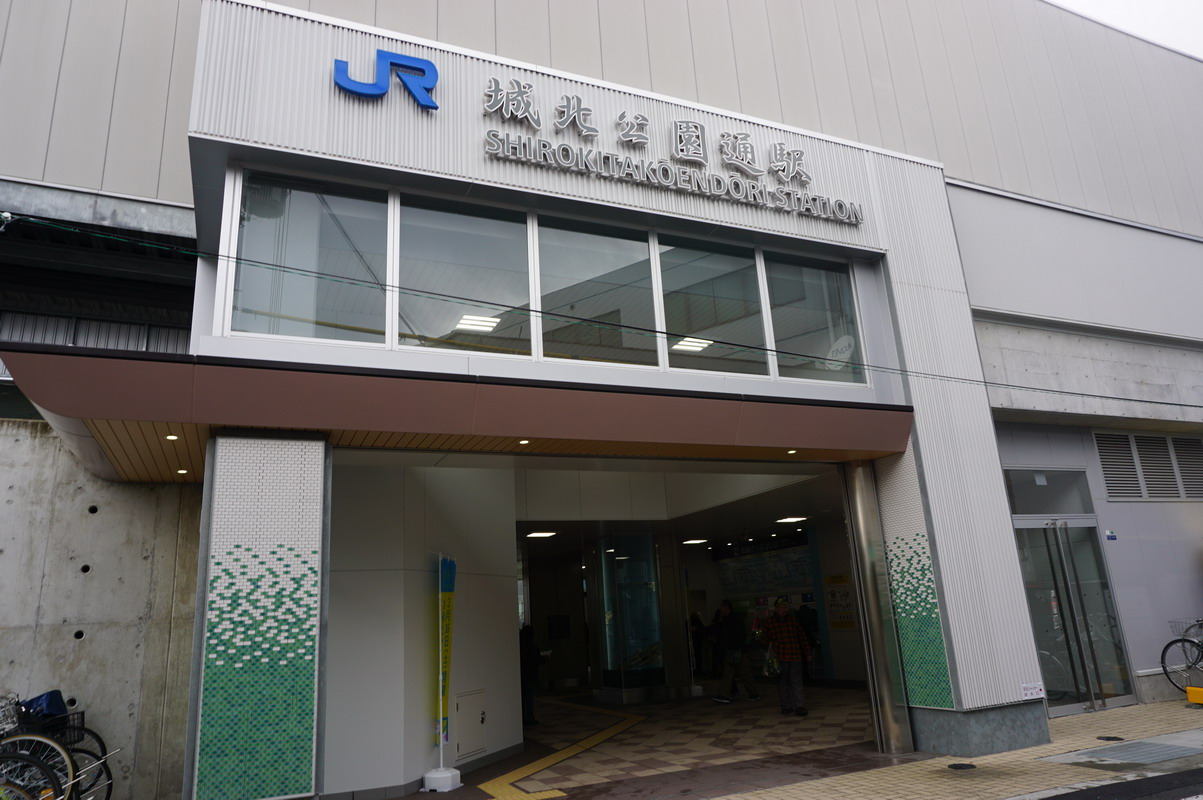
- Shirokitakoendori Station, March 2019

General information
- Location: Akagawa, Asahi-ku, Osaka-shi, Osaka; Japan
- Operator: JR West
- Line: ■ Osaka Higashi Line
- Platforms: 2 side platforms
- Tracks: 2

Construction
- Structure type: Elevated
- Accessible: Yes

Other information
- Status: Staffed

History
- Opened: 16 March 2019

Services
Preceding station	JR West	Following station
JR-Awaji towards Shin-Ōsaka	Osaka Higashi Line Local	JR-Noe towards Kyūhōji
Location

Shirokitakōendōri Station (城北公園通駅, Shirokitakōendōri-eki) is a railway station in Asahi-ku, Osaka, Osaka Prefecture, Japan, and operated by West Japan Railway Company (JR West). The station was opened on 16 March 2019.

== Lines ==
Shirokitakōendōri Station is served by the Osaka Higashi Line, and operation commenced on 16 March 2019.

== Layout ==
The station has two side platforms, each capable of accommodating eight-car trains.

== See also ==
- Miyakojima Station on the Osaka Municipal Subway nearby
- List of railway stations in Japan
