= JR-Noe Station =

Railway station in Osaka, Japan

JR-Noe Station JR野江駅
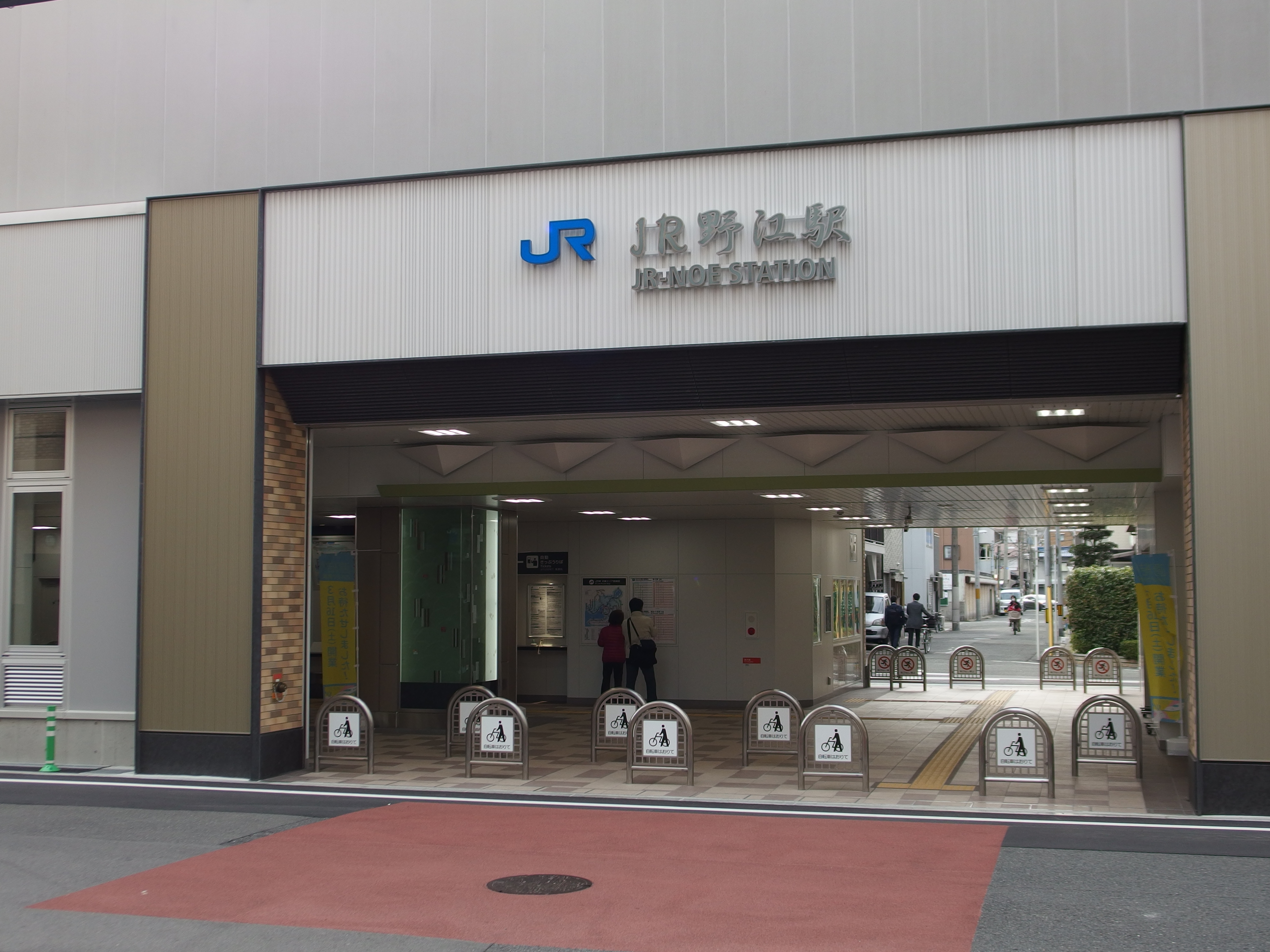
- JR-Noe Station, March 2019

General information
- Location: Noe, Jōtō-ku, Osaka-shi, Osaka; Japan
- Coordinates: 34.7071°N 135.5414°E
- Operator: JR West
- Line: ■ Osaka Higashi Line
- Platforms: 2 side platforms
- Tracks: 2

Construction
- Structure type: Elevated
- Accessible: Yes

Other information
- Website: Official website

History
- Opened: 16 March 2019

Services
Preceding station	JR West	Following station
Shirokitakōendōri towards Shin-Ōsaka	Osaka Higashi Line Local	Shigino towards Kyūhōji
Location

JR-Noe Station (JR野江駅, JR-Noe-eki) is a railway station in Jōtō-ku, Osaka, Osaka Prefecture, Japan, and operated by West Japan Railway Company (JR West). The station was opened on 16 March 2019.

== Lines ==
JR-Noe Station served by the Osaka Higashi Line, was completed on 16 March 2019.

== Layout ==
The station has two side platforms, each capable of accommodating eight-car trains.

== See also ==
- Noe-Uchindai Station on the Osaka Metro nearby
- Noe Station on the Keihan Railway nearby
- List of railway stations in Japan
