= JR-Shuntokumichi Station =

Railway station in Higashiōsaka, Osaka Prefecture, Japan

JR-Shuntokumichi Station JR俊徳道駅
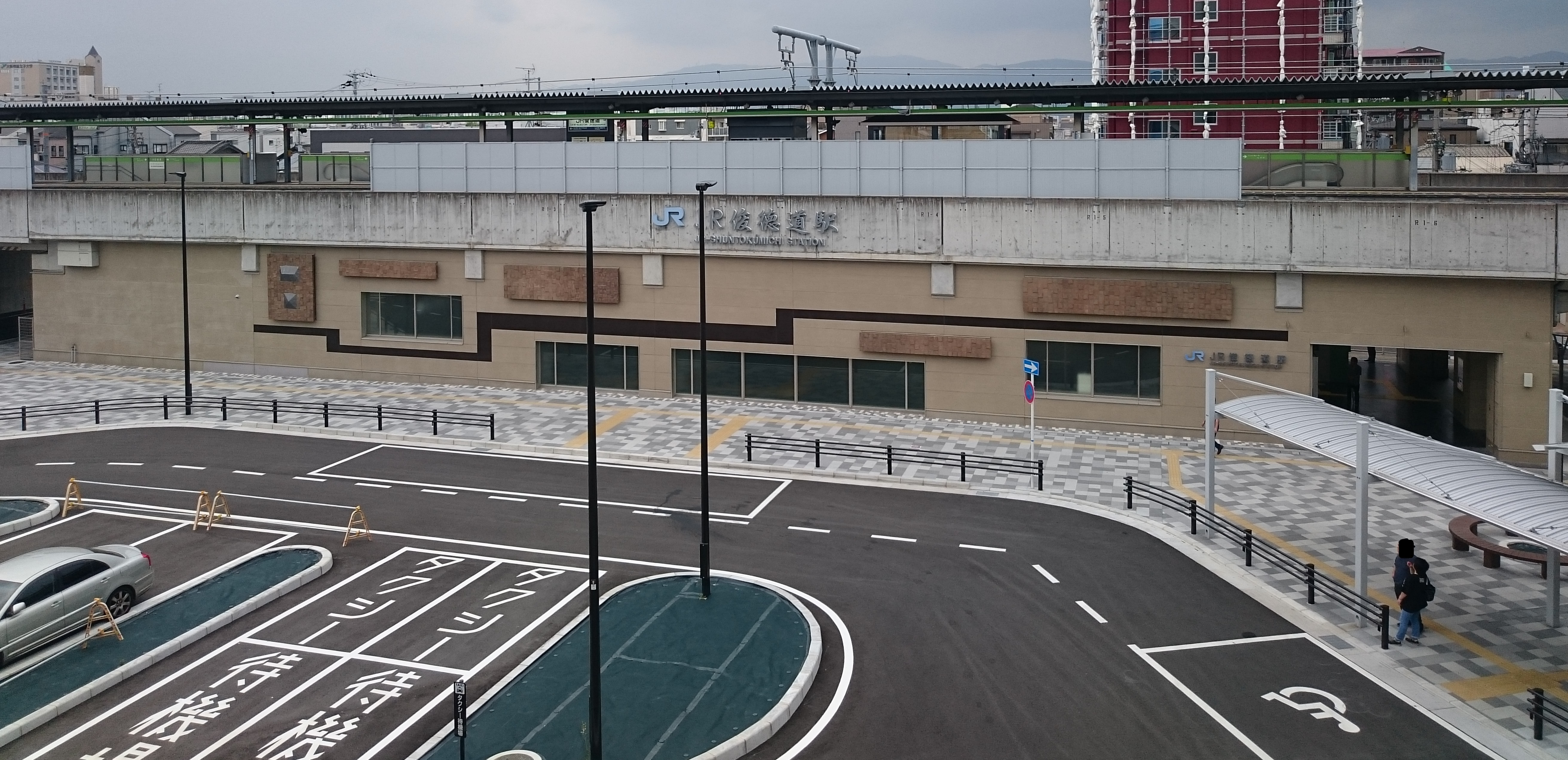
- JR Shuntokumichi Station, August 2019

General information
- Location: 1-24-15 Eiwa, Higashiōsaka-shi, Osaka-fu 577-0832; Japan
- Coordinates: 34°39′30.41″N 135°34′20.92″E
- System: JR-West commuter rail station
- Owner: Osaka Soto-Kanjo Railway Co., Ltd.
- Operator: West Japan Railway Company
- Line: F Osaka Higashi Line
- Distance: 14.9 km from Shin-Osaka
- Platforms: 1 island platform
- Tracks: 2

Construction
- Structure type: Elevated
- Accessible: Yes

Other information
- Station code: JR-F11
- Website: Official website

History
- Opened: 15 March 2008

Passengers
- FY2019: 5,201 daily
Location
- Location within Osaka Prefecture Location within Japan

JR-Shuntokumichi Station (JR俊徳道駅, JR-Shuntokumichi-eki) is a passenger railway station in located in the city of Higashiōsaka, Osaka Prefecture, Japan, operated by West Japan Railway Company (JR West).

== Lines ==
JR-Shuntokumichi Station is served by the Osaka Higashi Line, and is located 14.9 kilometers from Shin-Osaka Station.

== Station layout ==
The station has one elevated island platform, capable of accommodating eight-car trains, with the station building underneath. The station is staffed.

=== Platforms ===
1	■ F Osaka Higashi Line	for Shin-Osaka
2	■ F Osaka Higashi Line	for Kyūhōji

== Adjacent stations ==
«	Service	»
Osaka Higashi Line
JR Kawachi-Eiwa	Local	JR Nagase
Direct Rapid Service: Does not stop at this station

== History ==
The station was opened on 15 March 2008.

== Passenger statistics ==
In fiscal 2019, the station was used by an average of 5,201 passengers daily (boarding passengers only).

== Surrounding area ==
- Kintetsu Shuntokumichi Station

== See also ==
- List of railway stations in Japan
