= 321 series =

Japanese train type

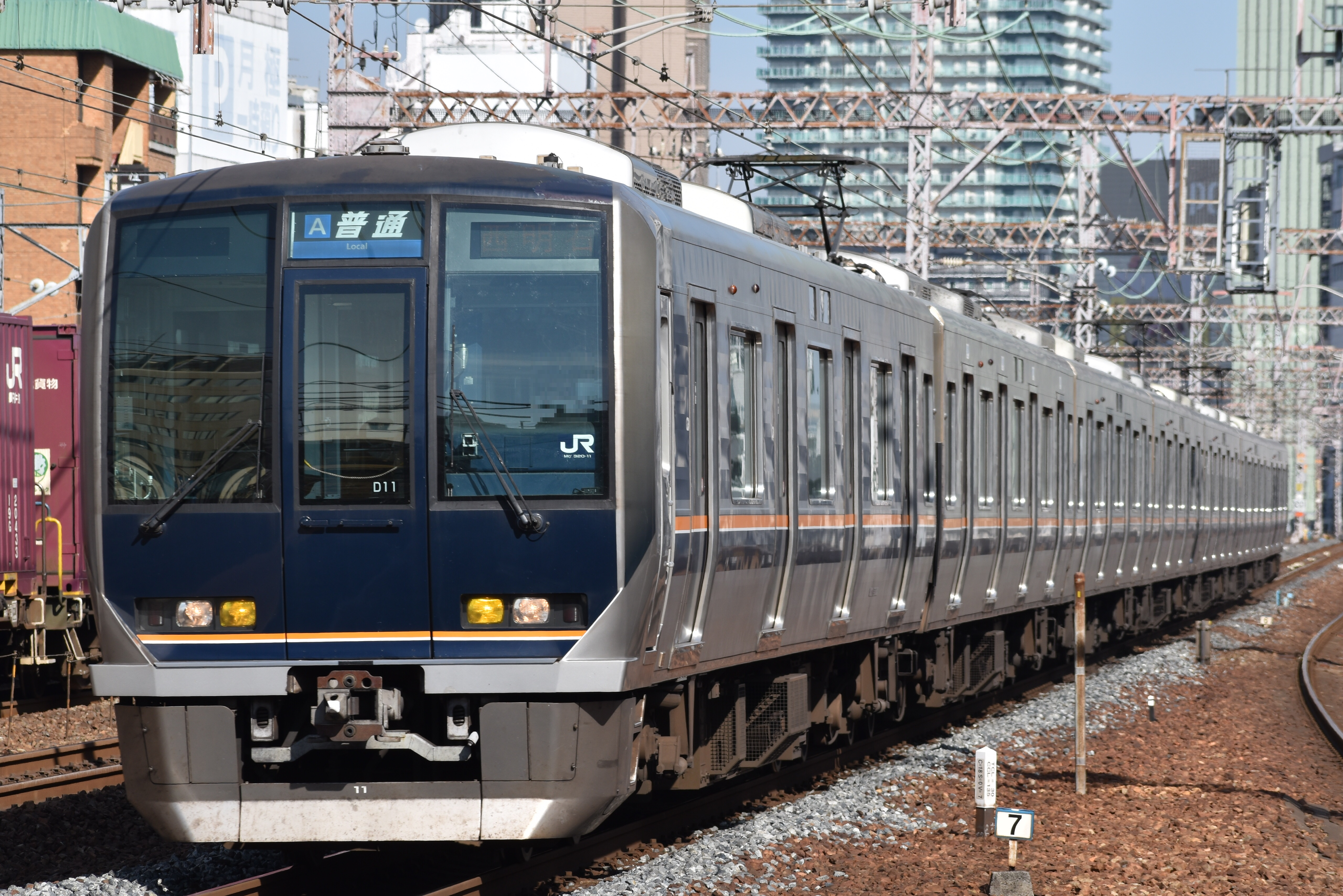
- 321 series set D11 in February 2021
- In service: 2005–present
- Manufacturer: Kinki Sharyo
- Built at: Higashiōsaka
- Replaced: 201 series, 205 series, 207 series (set Z16)
- Constructed: 2005–2007
- Entered service: 1 December 2005
- Number built: 273 vehicles (39 sets)
- Formation: 7 cars per trainset
- Fleet numbers: D1–D39
- Operator: JR-West
- Depot: Aboshi
- Lines served: A Tōkaidō Main Line; A Sanyo Main Line; B Kosei Line; G Fukuchiyama Line; H JR Tōzai Line; H Katamachi Line; Q Yamatoji Line

Specifications
- Car body construction: Stainless steel
- Train length: 136.600 m (448 ft 2.0 in)
- Car length: 19,550 mm (64 ft 2 in) (end cars); 19,500 mm (64 ft 0 in) (intermediate cars)
- Width: 2,950 mm (9 ft 8 in)
- Height: 3,630 mm (11 ft 11 in)
- Doors: 4 pairs per side
- Maximum speed: 120 km/h (75 mph)
- Weight: 232.8 t (229.1 long tons; 256.6 short tons)
- Traction system: Variable frequency (2-level IGBT)
- Power output: 270 kW (362 hp)
- Acceleration: 2.5 km/(h⋅s) (1.6 mph/s)
- Deceleration: 4.2 km/(h⋅s) (2.6 mph/s) (emergency)
- Electric system: 1,500 V DC overhead
- Current collection: WPS27D scissors-type pantograph
- Bogies: WDT63 (powered), WTR246/WTR246A (trailer)
- Braking systems: Regenerative brake, electronically controlled pneumatic brakes, snow-resistant brake
- Safety systems: ATS-SW, ATS-P
- Track gauge: 1,067 mm (3 ft 6 in)

The 321 series (321系, 321-kei) is a DC electric multiple unit (EMU) commuter train type operated by West Japan Railway Company (JR-West) in the Kansai Region of Japan.

== Overview ==
The 321 series was developed from the earlier 207 series to replace the ageing 201 series and 205 series trains on the Tōkaidō Main Line. One 321 series set also replaced the 207 series (set Z16) withdrawn due to collision damage sustained in the Amagasaki derailment of 25 April 2005.

== Operations ==
The 321 series share the same assignments as their 207 series counterparts. All 39 sets are allocated to Aboshi depot.

- Tōkaidō Main Line and Sanyō Main Line: Yasu – Kakogawa
- Fukuchiyama Line: Osaka – Sasayamaguchi
- JR Tōzai Line and Katamachi Line: Amagasaki – Kizu
- Osaka Higashi Line and Kansai Main Line (Yamatoji Line) (until 17 March 2023)

== Formation ==
Car No.	1	2	3	4	5	6	7
Designation	M'c	M	T	M'	M	M'	Mc
Numbering	KuMoHa 320	MoHa 321	SaHa 321	MoHa 320	MoHa 321	MoHa 320	KuMoHa 321
Capacity	142	156	156	156	156	156	142
Weight	35.1 t	34.1 t	27.3 t	33.3 t	34.1 t	33.3 t	35.6 t

The KuMoHa 321 and MoHa 321 cars each have two scissors-type pantographs.

== Interior ==
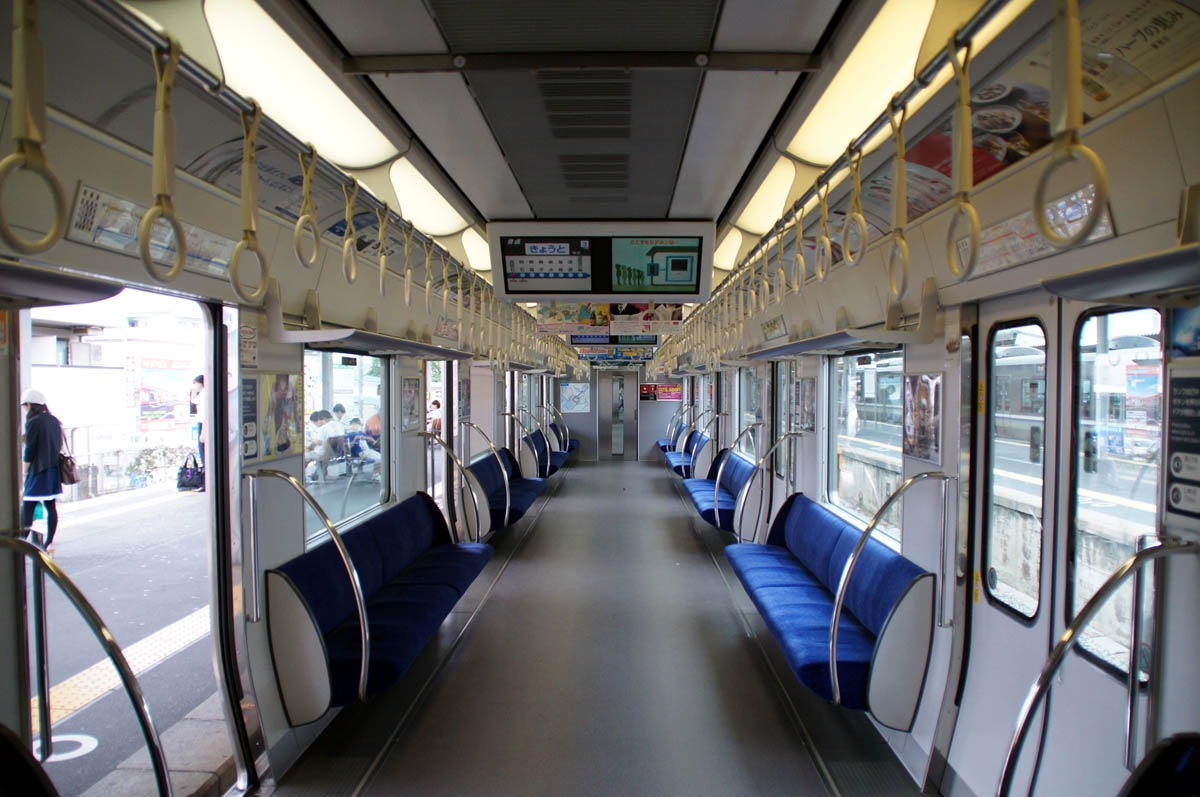
Original interior style in June 2010

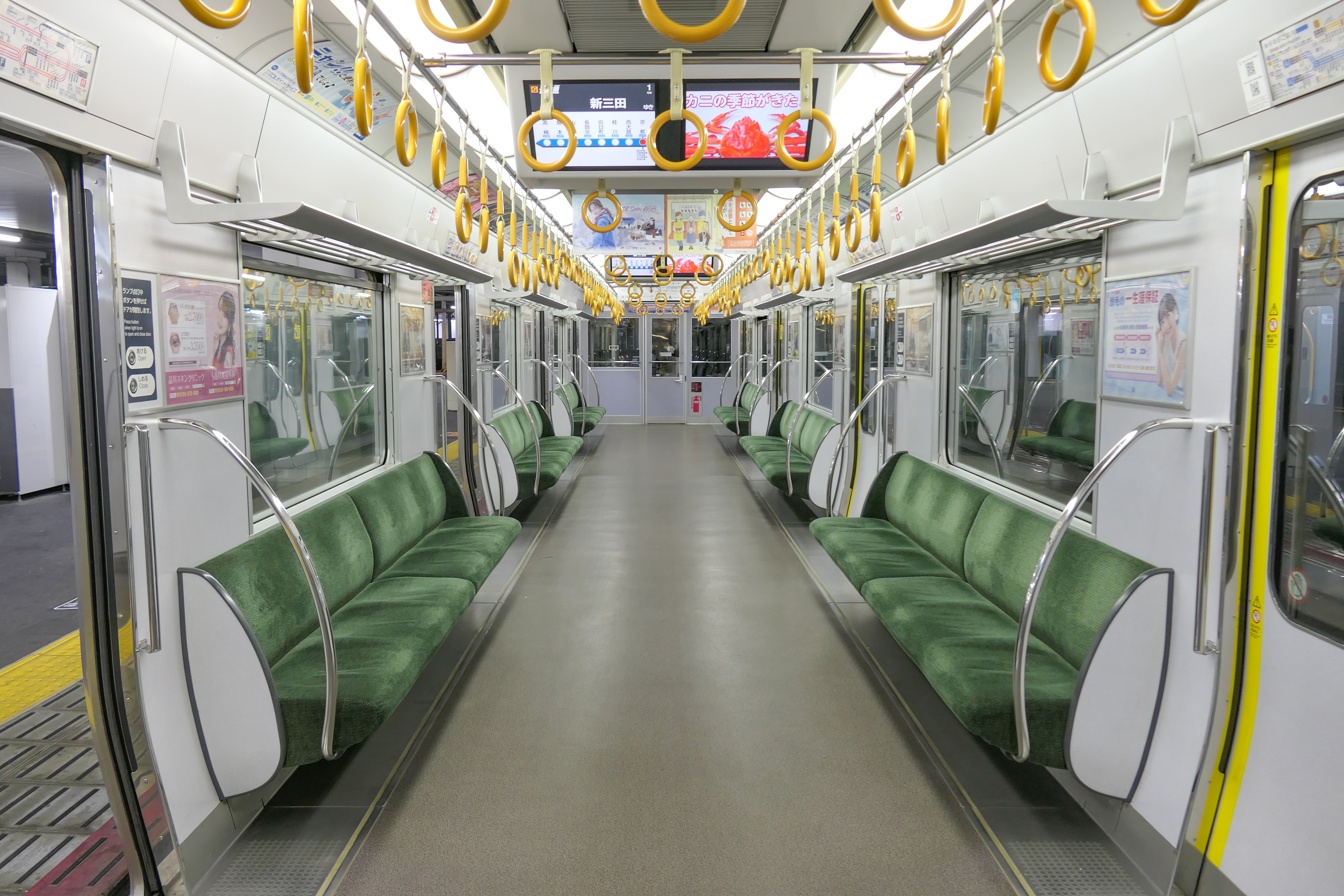
Interior following changes to seat covers and hanging straps, December 2021

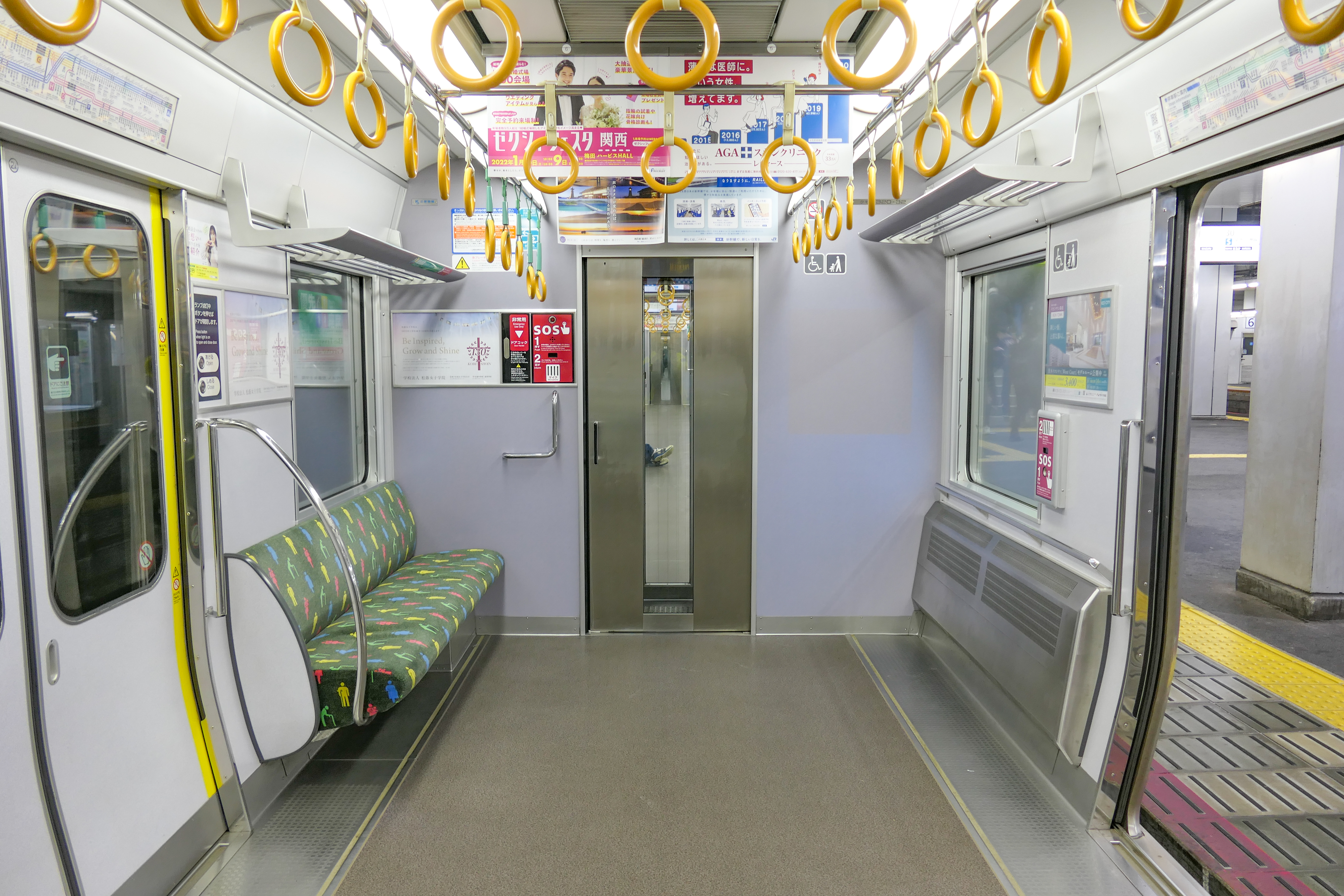
Priority seating and free space, December 2021

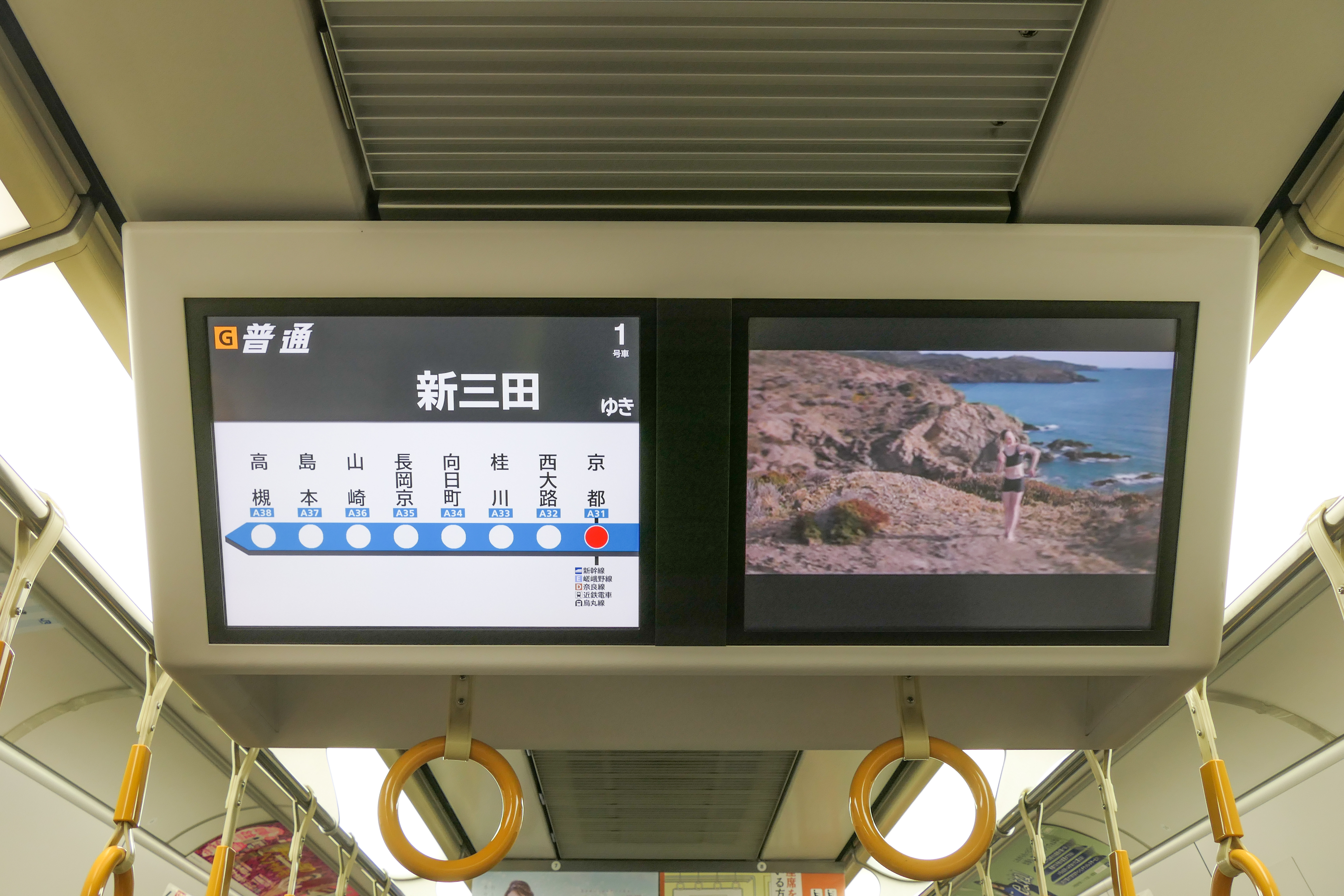
LCD passenger information display
