= Tōbu-shijō-mae Station =

Railway station in Osaka, Japan

Coordinates: 34°38′17.33″N 135°32′15.67″E

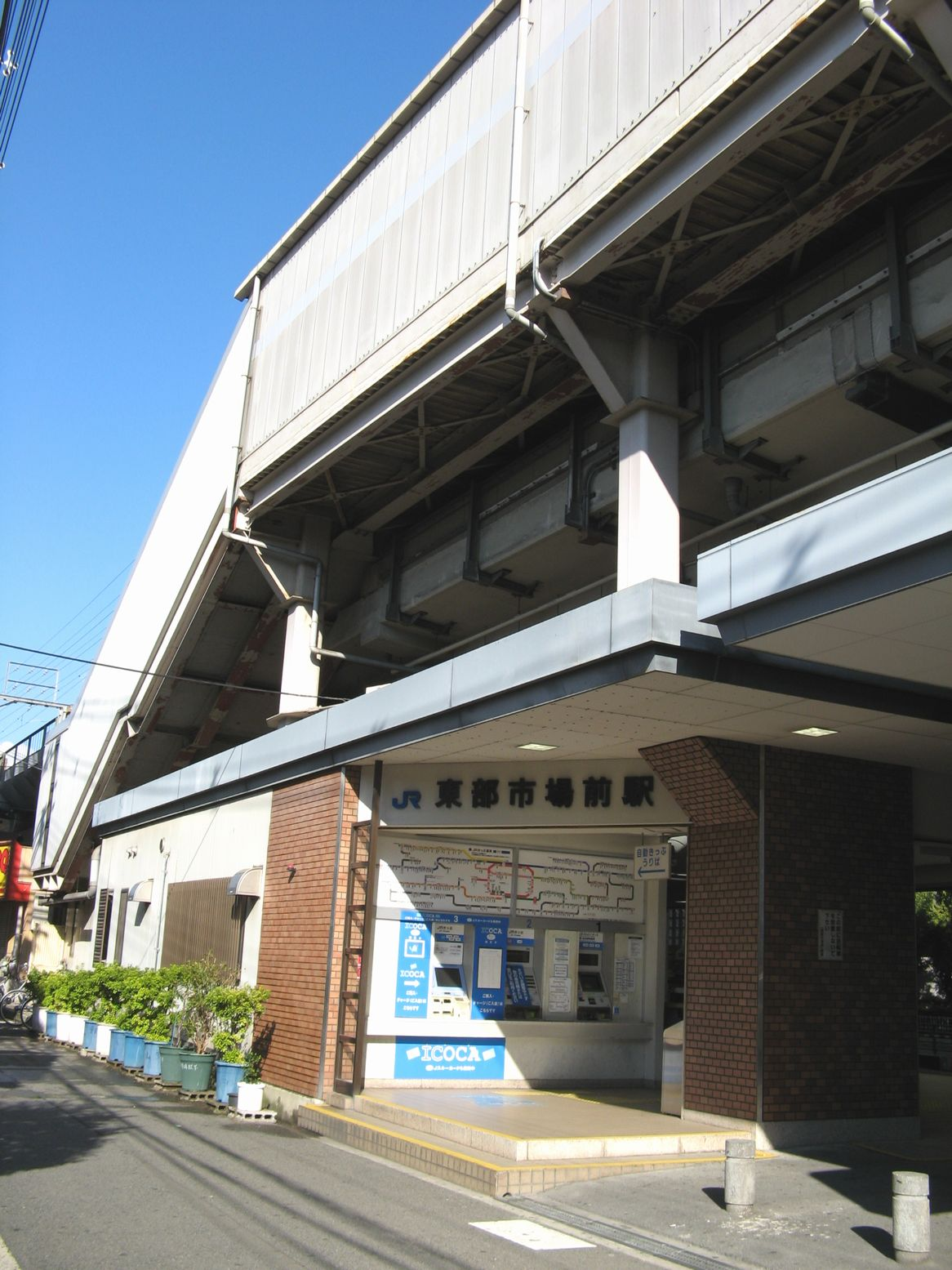
Tōbu-shijō-mae Station

Tōbu-shijō-mae Station (東部市場前駅, Tōbu-shijō-mae-eki) is a railway station on the West Japan Railway Company Kansai Line (Yamatoji Line) in Higashisumiyoshi-ku, Osaka, Osaka Prefecture, Japan.

== Layout ==
Tōbu-shijō-mae Station has two side platforms serving two elevated tracks. There is a difficulty of locating elevators (lifts) and escalators for the station structure.

1	■ Yamatoji Line	for Oji, Nara and Takada
2	■ Yamatoji Line	for Tennoji, JR Namba and Osaka

== Surroundings ==
- Osaka Municipal Central Wholesale Markets East Wholesale Market
- JR Freight Kudara Kamotsu Terminal
- Kumata Junction (Japan National Route 25 and Imazato-suji)

=== Bus stops ===
Kumata (Osaka Municipal Transportation Bureau)
- Kudara-ekimae Junction (along Imazato-suji)
  - Route 35 for Moriguchi Shako-mae via Subway Imazato
  - Route 35B for Subway Imazato
  - Route 85 for Namba via Subway Imazato and Tamatsukuri
- West side of Kumata Junction
  - Route 1 for Deto Bus Terminal via Hirano-Miyamachi Nichome and Kire-Higashiguchi
  - Route 30 for Hirano Kuyakusho-mae via JR Hirano-eki and Subway Hirano
  - Route 1 and Route 5 for Abenobashi via Naka-Kuwazu
  - Route 30 for Abenobashi via Teradacho
- East side of Kumata Junction
  - Route 1 for Deto Bus Terminal via Hirano-Miyamachi Nichome and Kire-Higashiguchi
  - Route 1 for Abenobashi via Naka-Kuwazu
- South-west side of Kumata Junction
  - Route 6 for Sunjiyata
  - Route 6 and Route 26 for Abenobashi via Bishoen
- South side of Kumata Junction
  - Route 5 for Miyake-naka
  - Route 6 for Sunjiyata
  - Route 73 for Deto Bus Terminal via Imagawa Hatchome and Hirano Sports Center
  - Route 5 for Abenobashi via Naka-Kuwazu
  - Route 73 for Namba via Katsuyama Yonchome and Uehommachi Rokuchome

== History ==
Tōbu-shijō-mae Station opened on 11 November 1989.

Station numbering was introduced in March 2018 with Kami being assigned station number JR-Q21.

== Adjacent stations ==
«	Service	»
JR West
Yamatoji Line
Hirano	Local	Tennōji
Regional Rapid Service: Does not stop at this station
Rapid Service: Does not stop at this station
Yamatoji Rapid Service: Does not stop at this station
