= Osaka Higashi Line =

Railway line in Osaka prefecture, Japan

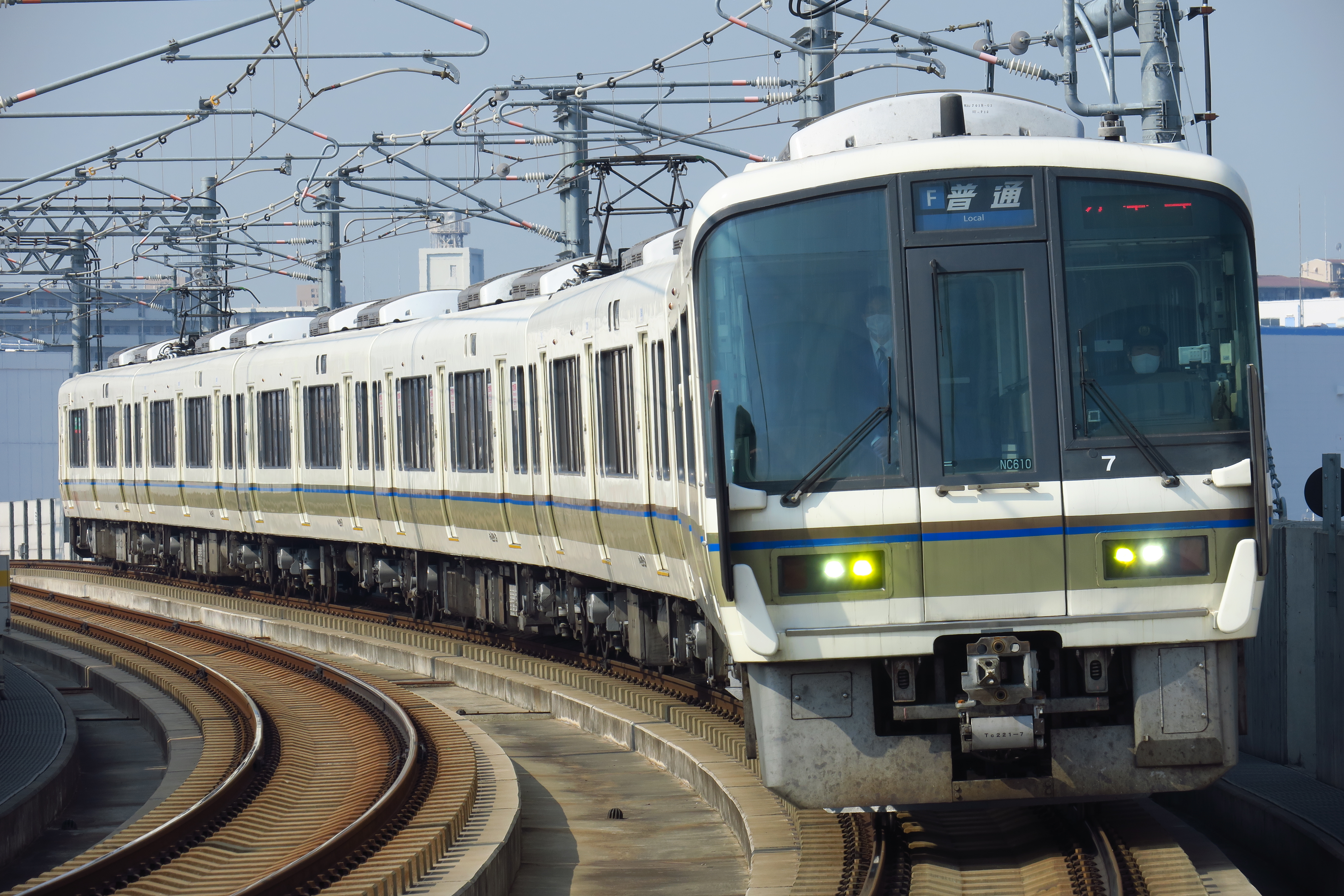
- A 221 series EMU on a Local service in March 2022

Overview
- Native name: おおさか東線
- Owner: Osaka Soto-Kanjo Railway Co., Ltd.
- Locale: Osaka Prefecture
- Termini: Ōsaka; Kyūhōji
- Stations: 15

Service
- Type: Heavy rail
- System: Urban Network
- Operator(s): JR-West; JR Freight
- Depot: Aboshi
- Rolling stock: 221 series EMU

History
- Opened: March 15, 1929; 97 years ago (as Katamachi Freight Branch Line); March 15, 2008 (as Osaka Higashi Line)

Technical
- Line length: 20.2 km (12.6 mi)
- Track gauge: 1,067 mm (3 ft 6 in)
- Electrification: 1,500 V DC (overhead lines)
- Operating speed: 120 km/h (75 mph)

The Osaka Higashi Line (おおさか東線, Ōsaka-Higashi-sen; lit. 'Osaka East Line') is a railway line in Osaka, Japan, operated by the West Japan Railway Company (JR West). The line connects Ōsaka Station in northern Osaka with Kyūhōji Station in Yao, forming an arc around the northern and eastern suburbs of the city. Before being named on August 23, 2007, the line was constructed with the tentative name "Osaka Outer Loop Line" (大阪外環状線, Ōsaka-soto-kanjōsen).

The line is constructed and owned by Osaka Soto-Kanjo Railway Co., Ltd. (大阪外環状鉄道株式会社, Ōsaka Sotokanjō Tetsudō Kabushiki Kaisha) as a Category 3 railway business under the Railway Business Act of Japan. JR West and JR Freight run trains as Category 2 operators. The Kita-Umeda extension opened on March 18, 2023, replacing the above-ground Umeda Freight Line.

== History ==
Conceived in the 1950s during Japan's explosive postwar economic growth, it was planned as a grand "outer loop" of the city, using existing freight lines to link Amagasaki with Shin-Ōsaka, Suita, Awaji, Hanaten, Kami, Uriwari and Sugimotochō, with a newly constructed segment into Osaka's (then primarily industrial) Nankō Port Town. However, with JNR's financial situation deteriorating catastrophically (culminating in its privatization) and continuing issues surrounding land acquisition and squatting by local residents on railway property, the plan was cut back to Shin-Osaka and Kami, terminating at Kyūhōji in the south. (The Hanwa Freight Line, which would have carried the southern segment from Kami to Sugimotochō, was officially abandoned by JR Freight in 2009.) The line connects Shin-Osaka Station in northern Osaka with Kyūhōji Station in Yao, forming an arc around the northern and eastern suburbs of the city.

The southern part opened on March 15, 2008. Due to problems with the illegal occupation of a site, construction of the northern part was delayed. Construction of the northern segment started in 2011, and the section between Shin-Ōsaka and Hanaten opened on March 16, 2019.

Incorporated into the second phase of the Osaka Higashi Line project is the construction of underground platforms at Osaka Station (known as Umekita). The project provides the basis for the future Naniwasuji Line while also providing a small shortcut on current services on the Haruka and Kuroshio limited express trains.

In February 2023, track switching work took place between the 11th and 13th of that month. The underground platforms began operation later in the year on March 18.

== Stations ==
- ● : Direct Rapid service stops here
- | : Direct Rapid service does not stop here

Local trains stop at all stations. For limited express Mahoroba, see the respective article.

No.	Station	Japanese	Distance (km)		Direct Rapid	Transfers	Location
No.	Station	Japanese	Between Stations	Total	Direct Rapid	Transfers	Location
JR-F01	Ōsaka	大阪	3.8	3.8	●	JR Kōbe Line (JR-A47) JR Takarazuka Line (JR-G47) Osaka Loop Line (JR-O11) From Osaka-umeda Station: Hankyū Kōbe Main Line, Hankyu Takarazuka Main Line, Hankyu Kyoto Main Line (HK-01); From Osaka-Umeda Station: Hanshin Main Line (HS 01); From Umeda Station: Midōsuji Line (M16); From Higashi-Umeda Station: Tanimachi Line (T20); From Nishi-Umeda Station: Yotsubashi Line (Y11); From Kitashinchi Station: JR Tōzai Line (JR-H44)	Kita-ku, Osaka
JR-F02	Shin-Ōsaka	新大阪	-	0.0	●	JR Kyoto Line (JR-A46) Tokaido・Sanyo Shinkansen Osaka Metro Midōsuji Line (M13)	Yodogawa-ku, Osaka
JR-F03	Minami-Suita	南吹田	2.0	2.0	|		Suita
JR-F04	JR-Awaji	JR淡路	1.3	3.3	●	From Awaji Station: Hankyu Kyoto Line (HK-63); Hankyu Senri Line (HK-63)	Higashiyodogawa-ku, Osaka
JR-F05	Shirokitakōendōri	城北公園通	2.1	5.4	●		Miyakojima-ku, Osaka
JR-F06	JR-Noe	JR野江	2.2	7.6	|	From Noe Station: Keihan Main Line (KH-05) From Noe-Uchindai Station: Osaka Metro Tanimachi Line (T16)	Joto-ku, Osaka
JR-F07	Shigino	鴫野	1.8	9.4	|	Katamachi Line (Gakkentoshi Line, JR-H40) Osaka Metro Imazatosuji Line	Joto-ku, Osaka
JR-F08	Hanaten	放出	1.6	11.0	●	Katamachi Line (Gakkentoshi Line, JR-H39)	Tsurumi-ku, Osaka
JR-F09	Takaida-Chūō	高井田中央	1.7	12.7	●	From Takaida Station: Osaka Metro Chūō Line (C22)	Higashiosaka, Osaka
JR-F10	JR Kawachi-Eiwa	JR河内永和	1.6	14.3	●	From Kawachi-Eiwa Station A Kintetsu Nara Line (A07)	Higashiosaka, Osaka
JR-F11	JR Shuntokumichi	JR俊徳道	0.6	14.9	|	From Shuntokumichi Station: D Osaka Line (D07)	Higashiosaka, Osaka
JR-F12	JR Nagase	JR長瀬	1.0	15.9	|		Higashiosaka, Osaka
JR-F13	Kizuri-Kamikita	衣摺加美北	1.3	17.2	|		Higashiosaka, Osaka
JR-F14	Shin-Kami	新加美	1.4	18.6	|		Hirano-ku, Osaka
JR-F15	Kyūhōji	久宝寺	1.6	20.2	●	Yamatoji Line (Kansai Main Line)	Yao, Osaka
Direct Rapid service through to Nara via the Yamatoji Line

== Rolling stock ==
=== Passenger ===
- 221 series (used for Local services from March 12, 2022 and Direct Rapid services from March 18, 2023)

==== Former ====
- 103 series (until 2018)
- 201 series (until March 11, 2022)
- 207 series (used for Direct Rapid Services from March 12, 2011, until March 17, 2023)
- 223-6000 series (used for Direct Rapid Services from March 15, 2008, until March 11, 2011)
- 321 series (Used for Direct Rapid Services until March 17, 2023)

The 103 and 201 series trains are based at Nara Depot, the 207 series trains are based at Aboshi Depot, while the 223-6000 series trains were based at Miyahara Depot.

=== Freight ===
Locomotives seen hauling freight trains include the DD51, DE10, EF66, EF81 and EF210.

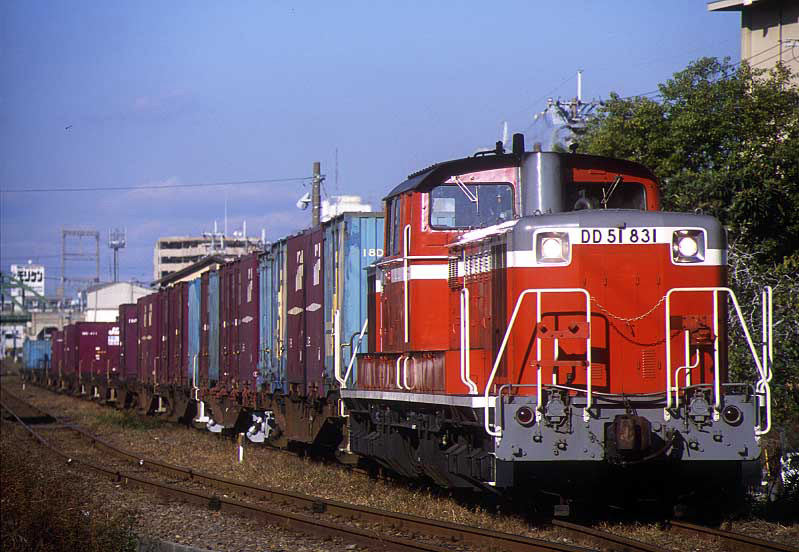
A DD51 locomotive on the Osaka Higashi Line in November 2001

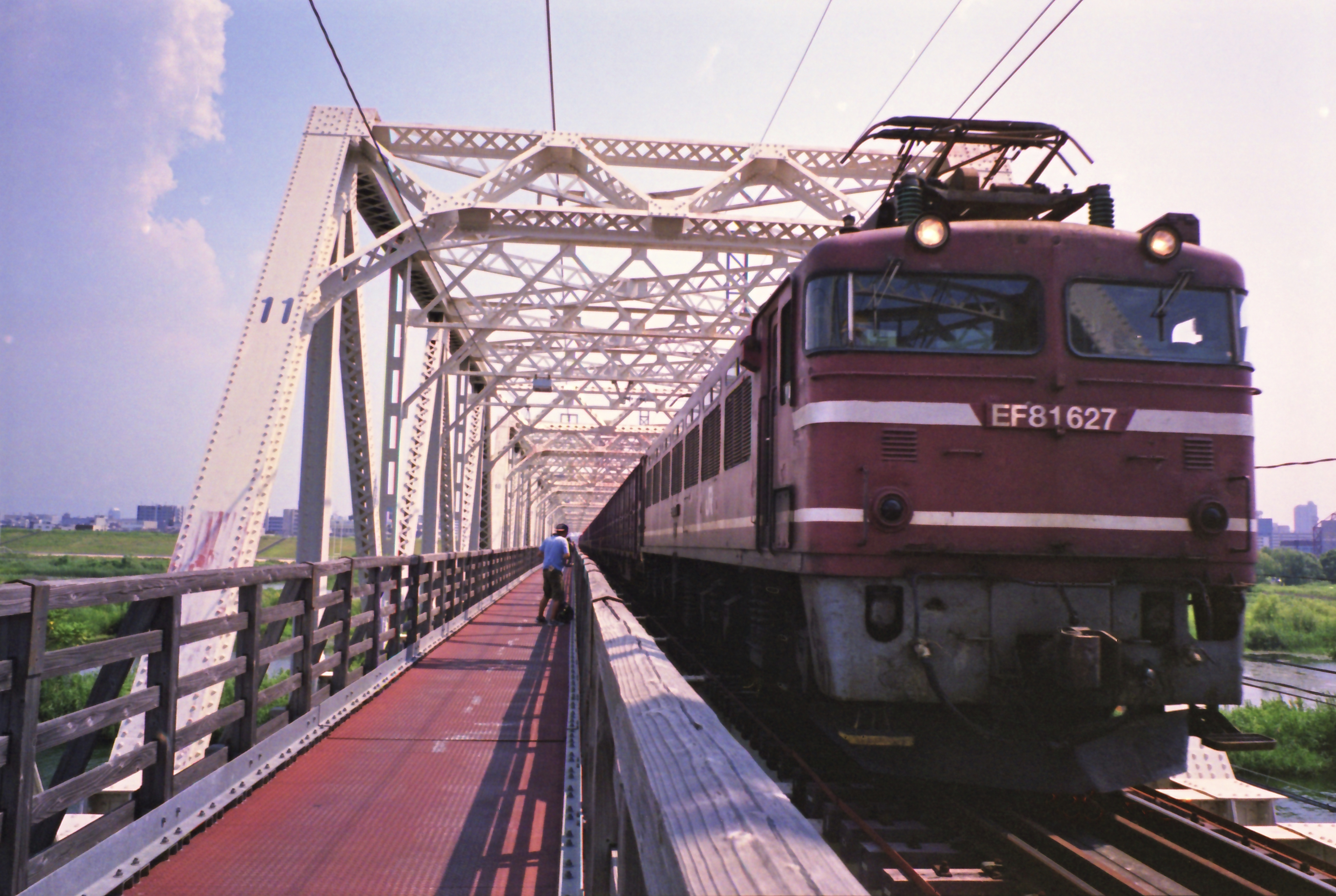
An EF81 locomotive on the Akagawa Bridge in August 2013

== See also ==
- Musashino Line, in the Tokyo area
- Aichi Loop Line and JR-Central Transport Service Jōhoku Line in the Nagoya area
