= JR-Awaji Station =

Railway station in Osaka, Japan

JR-Awaji Station JR淡路駅
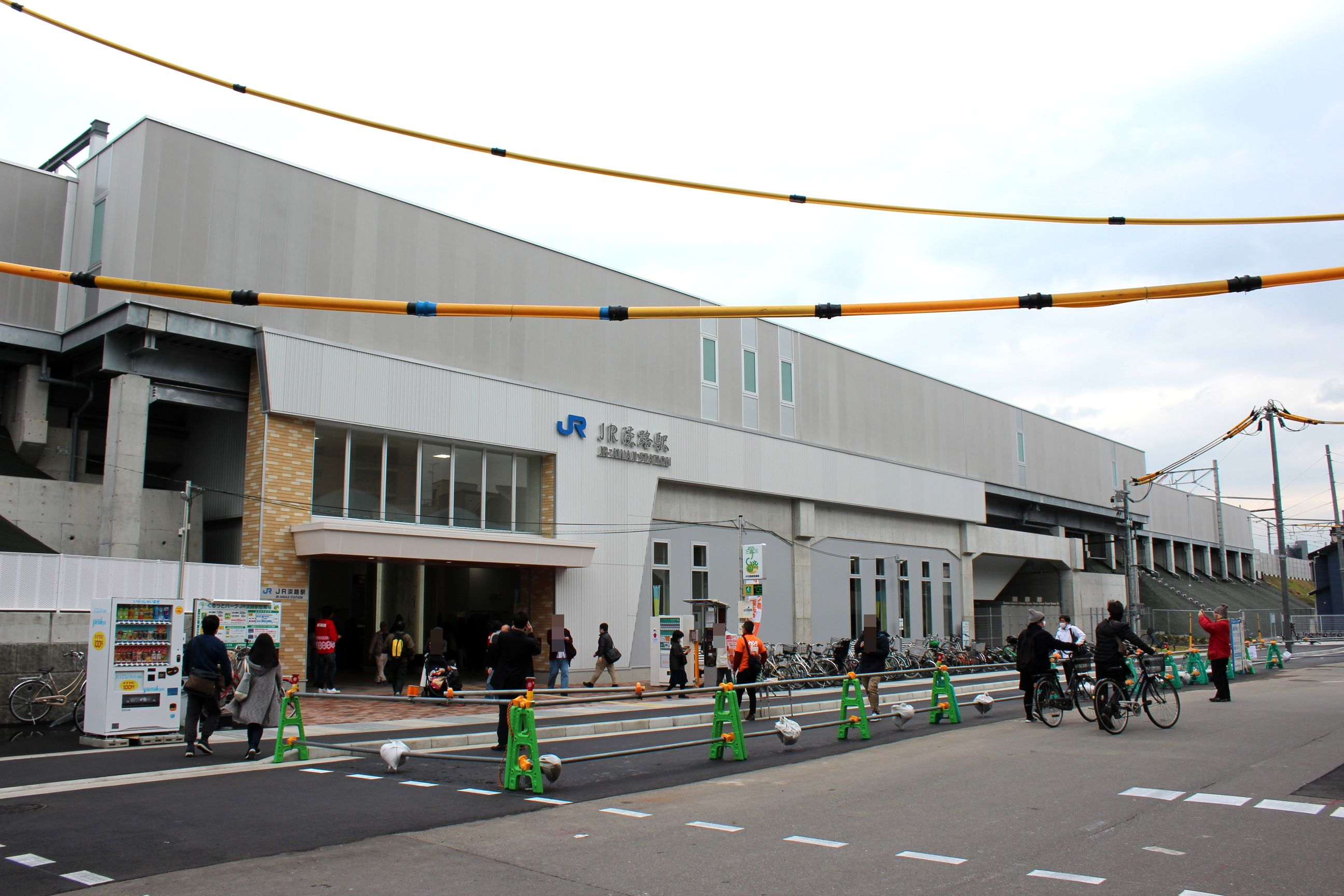
- JR-Awaji Station, March 2019

General information
- Location: Sugahara, Higashiyodogawa-ku, Osaka-shi, Osaka; Japan
- Coordinates: 34.7409°N 135.5197°E
- Operator: JR West
- Line: ■ Osaka Higashi Line
- Platforms: 2 side platforms

History
- Opened: 16 March 2019

Services
Preceding station	JR West	Following station
Minami-Suita towards Shin-Ōsaka	Osaka Higashi Line Local	Shirokitakōendōri towards Kyūhōji
Location

JR-Awaji Station (JR淡路駅, JR-Awaji-eki) is a railway station in Higashiyodogawa-ku, Osaka, Osaka Prefecture, Japan, and operated by West Japan Railway Company (JR West). The station was opened on 16 March 2019.

== Lines ==
JR-Awaji Station served by the Osaka Higashi Line, was completed on 16 March 2019.

== Layout ==
The station has two side platforms, each capable of accommodating eight-car trains.

== See also ==
- Awaji Station on the Hankyu Railway nearby
- List of railway stations in Japan
