= Hirano-ku =

Ward of Osaka, Japan

Coordinates: 34°37′16″N 135°32′46″E

Location of Hirano-ku in Osaka City

Hirano-ku (平野区) is one of 24 wards which make up the city of Osaka, and is located in the southeast of the city. It is the largest Osaka ward in population and the only ward to have over 200,000 residents.

In the Sengoku Period, Sakai and Hirano were known as two of the largest autonomous cities in the Kinai region, and were closely linked through a cooperative relationship often referred to as the Hirano-Sakai Alliance (平堺同盟, Heikai Domei).

== Geography ==
The north-west side of Hirano-ku is on the southern part of the Uemachi Plateau, but the overall terrain is mostly flat. The Yamato River flows through the south of the ward, and the Uriwari Cemetery is located inside the ward.

Also there is a river called Hirano River, which formed the moat of Hirano in Sengoku Period, to protect the city from threats of daimyo.

== History ==
The name Hirano probably goes back to the end of the Heian period, and was formally known as Hirano-shou in Sumiyoshi-gun (district) of the Settsu province. The second son of Sakanoue no Tamuramaro, Sakanoue no Hirono, was the feudal lord in charge of the development of Hirano and was called Hirano-tono (tono being the title given to noblemen).

There are a couple of theories as to the origin of the name Hirano. One is that it is a corruption or mispronunciation of the word hirono (広野). Another theory is that it comes from the time when many lakes and marshes were reclaimed and the fields (野) were widened (平らになった) making the kanji combination 平野.

=== Hirano ===
During the late Muromachi and Sengoku periods, Hirano developed into a self-governing town with economic significance. Then Hirano was governed by seven famous merchant families called Shichimyoke. Also, In this period, Hirano maintained close relations with the neighbouring autonomous city of Sakai governed by Egoshu. This cooperative relationship is often referred to as the "Hirano–Sakai Alliance and is generally understood as having been reinforced in order to protect their political and economic autonomy amid increasing pressure from territorial daimyō, including Oda Nobunaga.

Along with Osaka (Ishiyama Hongan-ji), Sakai and Hirano are often described as forming the Three Major Cities of Osaka (大坂三都市), each characterised by a relatively high degree of self-governance during the late medieval period.

Although Hirano was still keeping self-governance during Azuchi-Momoyama Period, but was completely destroyed by fire during the Siege of Osaka. This was because one of the consuls of Hirano then, Sueyoshi Yoshiyasu, provided substantial support to the Tokugawa side.

In Edo Period, Yoshiyasu invested his personal fortune in the reconstruction effort, and Hirano was rebuilt as one of the largest Zaigocho, a city actually acting as a city, but legally treated as an outland area. One document states that the population of Hirano was well over 10,00 in 1704.

=== Kire ===
According to the Hirano-ku History, Kire (喜連) was developed between Yayoi Period and Asuka Period. There are various theories of the name origin "Kire", one popular theory says that Kurehito (伎人), group of immigrants from Baekje is considered the most likely.

In the Middle Ages, Kire was also moated as Kire Castle (喜連城 Kire-jo), and fulfilled their role as one of castles affected from Ishiyama Hongan-ji.

=== Uriwari ===
The name of Uriwari (瓜破) came from Dōshō, a Japanese monk who played important role of spreading Japanese Buddhism. When Dōshō was walking through Uriwari, a watermelon (瓜) flew to his head and cracked (割れた=破れた) then.

== Transportation ==
=== Train ===
West Japan Railway Company (JR West)

- Kansai Main Line: (via Oji Staton, Nara Station and Kamo Station) - Kami Station - Hirano Station - (via Tennoji Station and JR-Namba Station)
- Osaka Higashi Line: (via Kyuhoji Station) - Shin-Kami Station - (via Hanaten Station, Shin-Osaka Station and Osaka Station)

Osaka Metro

- Tanimachi Line: (via Tennoji Station, Higashi-Umeda Station and Dainichi Station) - Hirano Station - Kire-Uriwari Station - Deto Station - Nagahara Station - (Yaominami Station, terminal)

Nankai Electric Railway

- Hirano Line (abolished): (terminate here) - Hirano Station - Nishi-Hirano Station - (via Imaike Station, Ebisuchō Station and Tennoji-Ekimae Station)

In the past, Hirano Line of Nankai Electric Railway was operating. However the line made abolished in 1980, and Tanimachi Line, a new metro line following almost the same route was built in the same time by Osaka Municipal Subway. This was because population growth around Osaka city center and Hirano area.

== Education ==
=== Universities and colleges ===
- Tokiwakai Gakuen University
- Tokiwakai College

== Religion ==
- Dainenbutsu-ji
- Senkō-ji

== Notable people ==
- Akihiro Yano, Professional baseball player
- Daishōmaru Shōgo, sumo wrestler
- Shōfukutei Tsurube II, rakugo comedian and actor
- Satoshi Matsuda, actor
- Yuki Matsuoka, voice actress
- Masami Hisamoto, Talent
- Lee Myung-bak, President of South Korea (2008 – 2013)
- ManaKana, twin actresses
- Ai Haruna, Transsexual television actor
