= Yao Station =

Railway station in Yao, Osaka Prefecture, Japan

Yao Station 八尾駅
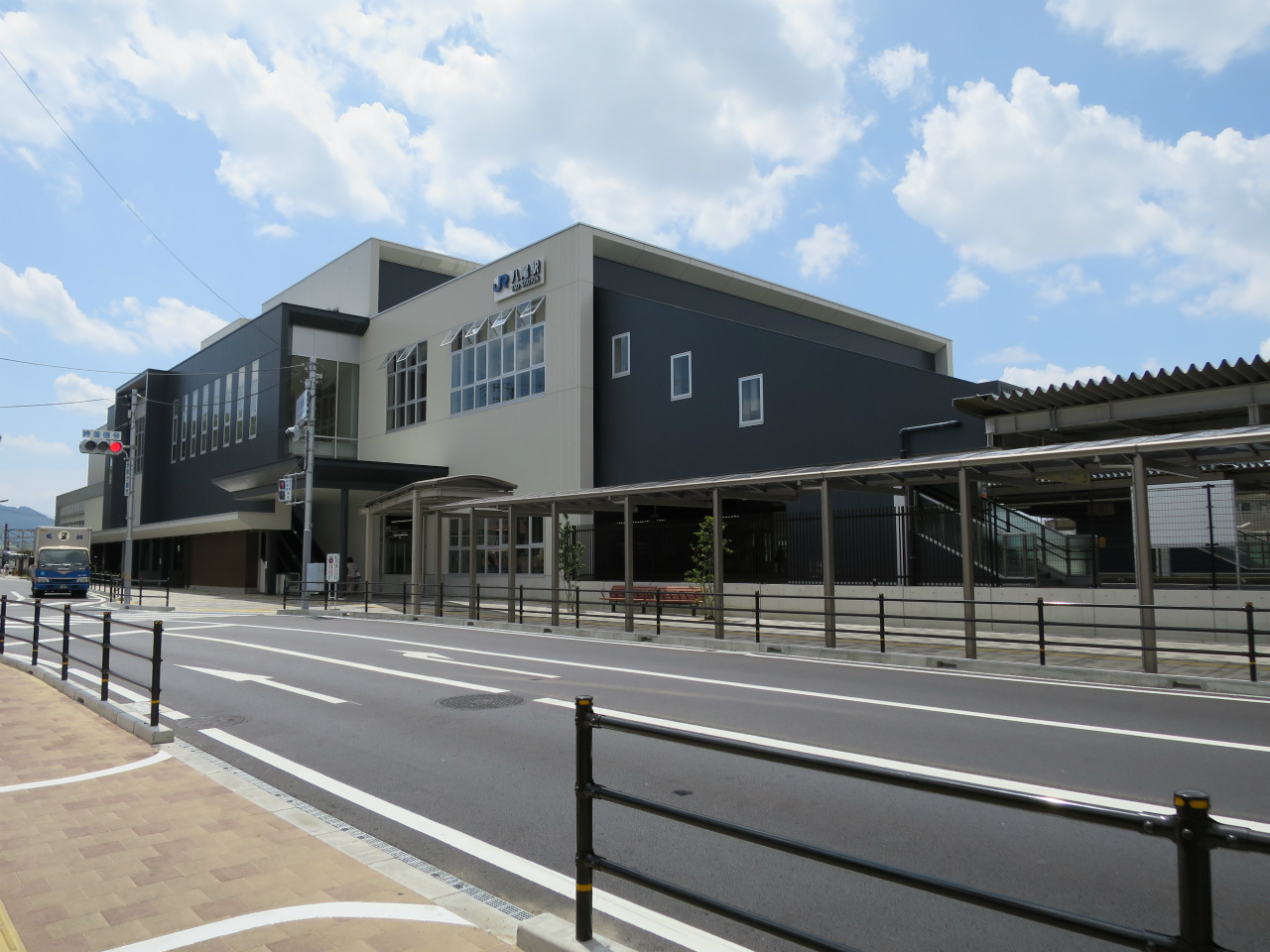
- Yao Station, July 2014

General information
- Location: 3-9 Yasunaka-chō, Yao-shi, Osaka-fu 581-0085; Japan
- Coordinates: 34°37′3.2″N 135°35′48.3″E
- System: JR-West commuter rail station
- Owner: JR West
- Operator: JR West
- Line: Q Kansai Main Line (Yamatoji Line)
- Distance: 163.1 km (101.3 miles) from Nagoya; 42.2 km (26.2 miles) from Kamo
- Platforms: 2 side platforms
- Tracks: 2
- Train operators: JR West

Other information
- Status: Staffed (Midori no Madoguchi)
- Station code: JR-Q25
- Website: Official website

History
- Opened: 14 May 1889

Passengers
- FY2019: 13,165 daily
Services
Preceding station	JR West	Following station
Kyūhōji towards JR Namba	Yamatoji Line Local	Shiki towards Kamo
Location
- Location within Osaka Prefecture Location within Japan

Yao Station (八尾駅, Yao-eki) is a passenger railway station in located in the city of Yao, Osaka Prefecture, Japan, operated by West Japan Railway Company (JR West).

== Lines ==
Yao Station is served by the Kansai Main Line (Yamatoji Line), and is located 163.1 kilometers from the terminus of the line at Nagoya Station and 42.2 kilometers from Kamo.

== Station layout ==
The station consists of two opposed side platforms connected by an elevated station building. The station has a Midori no Madoguchi staffed ticket office.

=== Platforms ===
1	■ Q Yamatoji Line	for Ōji, Nara and Takada
2	■ Q Yamatoji Line	for Tennōji, Namba and Osaka

== History ==
Yao station opened on 14 May 1889. With the privatization of Japanese National Railways (JNR) on 1 April 1987, the station came under the control of JR West.

Station numbering was introduced in March 2018 with Yao being assigned station number JR-Q25.

== Passenger statistics ==
In fiscal 2019, the station was used by an average of 13,165 passengers daily (boarding passengers only).

== Surrounding Area ==
- YYao City Anchu Elementary School
- Yao Municipal Seiho Junior High School
- Osaka Prefectural Yao High School

== See also ==
- List of railway stations in Japan
