= Hirano Station (JR West) =

Railway station in Osaka, Japan

Hirano Station 平野駅
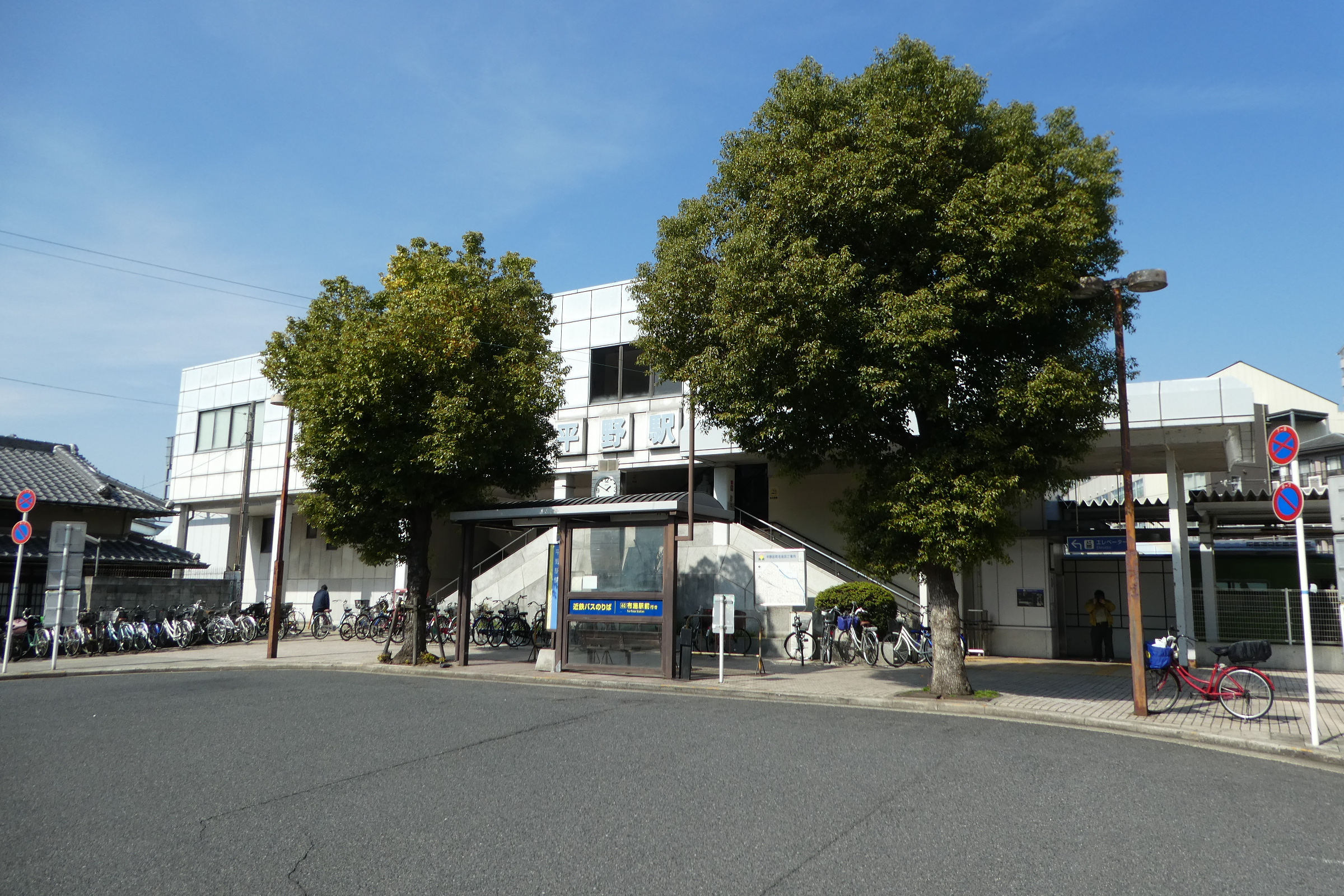
- South entrance in 2018

General information
- Location: Japan
- Coordinates: 34°37′50.65″N 135°33′6.21″E
- Operator: West Japan Railway Company (JR West)
- Line: Kansai Main Line (Yamatoji Line)
- Platforms: 1 island platform; 1 side platform
- Tracks: 4
- Connections: Bus terminal

Construction
- Structure type: Ground level
- Accessible: Yes

History
- Opened: 1889

Services
Preceding station	JR West	Following station
Tobu-shijo-mae towards JR Namba	Yamatoji Line Local	Kami towards Kamo
Location

Hirano Station (平野駅, Hirano-eki) is a railway station on the West Japan Railway Company Kansai Main Line (Yamatoji Line) in Hirano-ku, Osaka, Osaka Prefecture, Japan.

== Layout ==
The station on the Yamatoji Line has a side platform serving a track, an island platform serving two tracks and a passing track for Tennoji.

1	■ Yamatoji Line	for Tennōji and JR Namba
passing track	■ Yamatoji Line	no platform
2, 3	■ Yamatoji Line	for Ōji, Nara and Takada

== Surroundings ==
- Japan National Route 25
- Sumitomo Mitsui Banking Corporation Hirano Branch
- Osaka Municipal Hirano Library
- Hirano Police Station (Osaka Prefecture)

=== Buses ===
JR Hirano-eki (Osaka Municipal Transportation Bureau):

- Route 19 for Subway Imazato via Subway Kita-Tatsumi / for Kami-higashi Sanchoma-higashi
- Route 30 for Abenobashi via Subway Minami-Tatsumi, Kumata, and Teradacho / for Hirano Kuyakusho-mae via Subway Hirano

Hirano-ekimae (Kintetsu Bus Co., Ltd.):

- Route 40 (Kami Route) for Fuse-ekimae

== History ==
Station numbering was introduced in March 2018 with Hirano being assigned station number JR-Q22.
