= Shuntokumichi Station =

Railway station in Higashiōsaka, Osaka Prefecture, Japan

Shuntokumichi Station 俊徳道駅
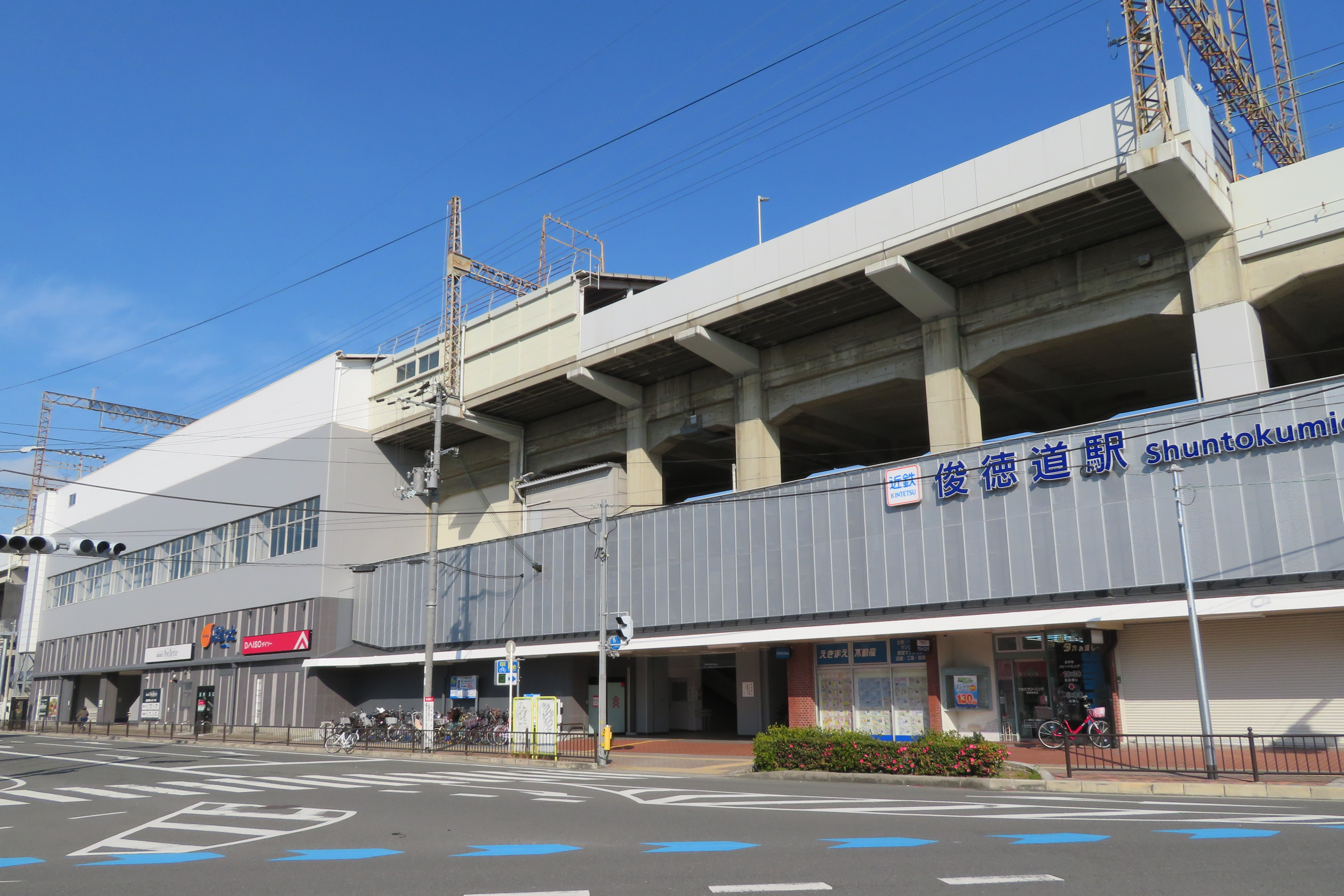
- Shuntokumichi Station, January 2020

General information
- Location: --1-15 Shuntokucho, Higashiōsaka-shi, Osaka-fu 577-0831; Japan
- Coordinates: 34°39′29.89″N 135°34′18.61″E
- Operator: Kintetsu Railway
- Line: Osaka Line
- Distance: 5.1 km from Ōsaka Uehommachi
- Platforms: 2 side platforms
- Connections

Other information
- Station code: D07
- Website: Official website

History
- Opened: December 30, 1926

Passengers
- FY2018: 6,699 daily
Location
- Location within Osaka Prefecture Location within Japan

Shuntokumichi Station (俊徳道駅, Shuntokumichi-eki) is a passenger railway station in located in the city of Higashiōsaka, Osaka Prefecture, Japan, operated by the private railway operator Kintetsu Railway. It is adjacent to, but not connected with, the JR West JR-Shuntokumichi Station.

== Lines ==
Shuntokumichi Station is served by the Osaka Line, and is located 5.1 rail kilometers from the starting point of the line at Ōsaka Uehommachi Station.

== Station layout ==
The station consists of two elevated side platforms, with the station building underneath

=== Platforms ===
1	■ Osaka Line	for Kawachi-Kokubu and Yamato-Yagi
2	■ Osaka Line	for Fuse and Osaka Uehommachi

== Adjacent stations ==
«	Service	»
Osaka Line (Shuntokumichi)
Fuse	Local	Nagase
Suburban Semi-Express: Does not stop at this station
Semi-Express: Does not stop at this station
Express: Does not stop at this station
Rapid Express: Does not stop at this station

== History ==
Shuntokumichi Station opened on December 30, 1926.

== Passenger statistics ==
In fiscal 2018, the station was used by an average of 6,699 passengers daily.

== Surrounding area ==
- JR-Shuntokumichi Station
- Higashi Osaka Municipal Fuse Junior High School
- Higashi Osaka Municipal Arakawa Elementary School
- Higashi Osaka City Sannose Elementary School
- Higashi Osaka City Taiheiji Elementary School

== See also ==
- List of railway stations in Japan
