= Nagase Station =

Railway station in Higashiōsaka, Osaka Prefecture, Japan

Nagase Station (Kindai University-mae) 長瀬駅（近畿大学前）
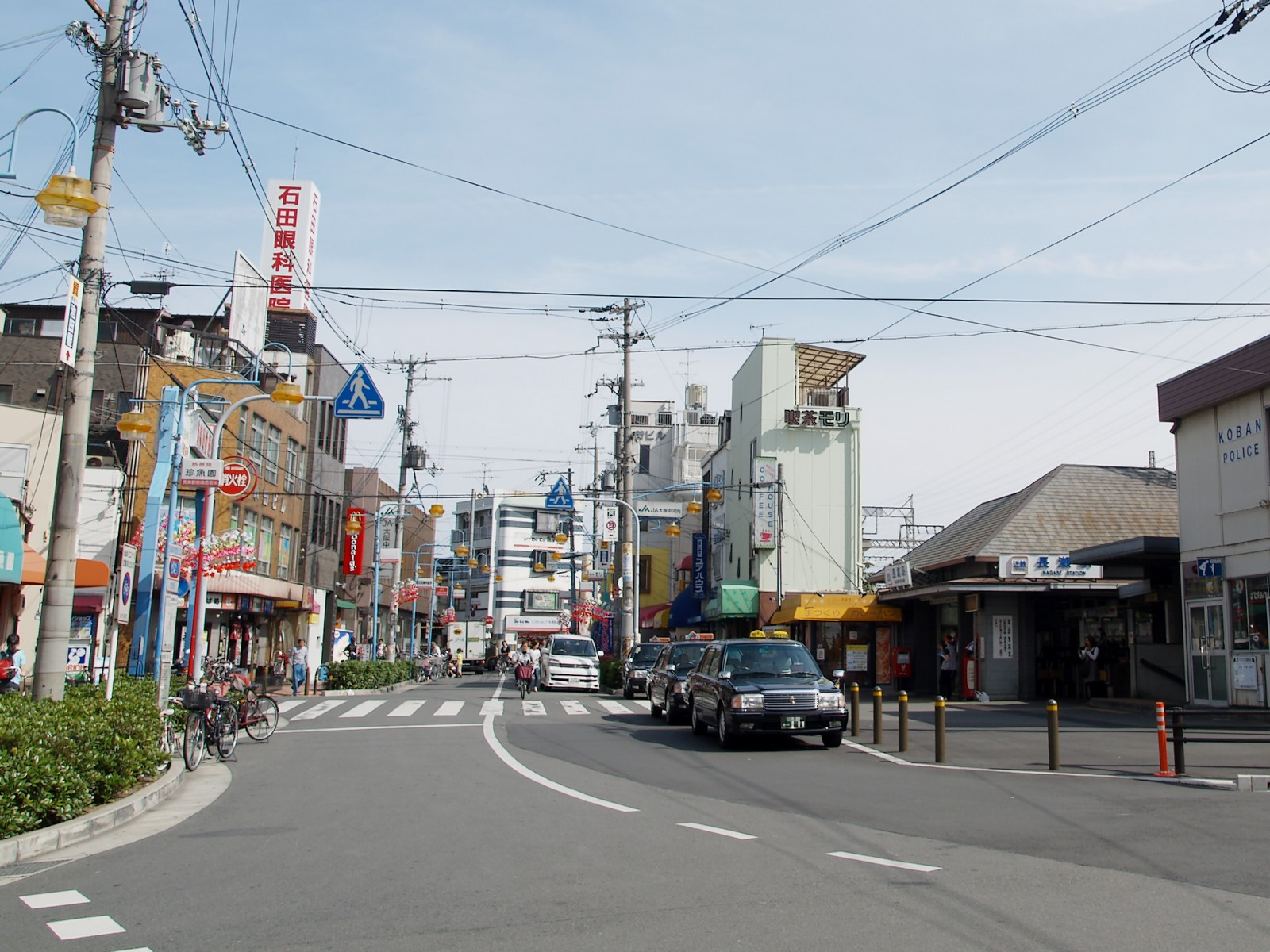
- Nagase Station East Exit

General information
- Location: 1-24-26, Hishiya-nishi, Higashiōsaka-shi, Osaka-fu 350-0462; Japan
- Coordinates: 34°39′01″N 135°34′39″E
- Operator: Kintetsu Railway
- Line: Osaka Line
- Distance: 6.2 km from Ōsaka Uehommachi
- Platforms: 2 side platforms
- Connections

Other information
- Station code: D08
- Website: Official website

History
- Opened: October 31, 1924

Passengers
- FY2018: 30,889 daily
Location
- Location within Osaka Prefecture Location within Japan

Nagase Station (長瀬駅, Nagase-eki) is a passenger railway station in located in the city of Higashiōsaka, Osaka Prefecture, Japan, operated by the private railway operator Kintetsu Railway.

== Lines ==
Nagase Station is served by the Osaka Line, and is located 6.2 rail kilometers from the starting point of the line at Ōsaka Uehommachi Station.

== Station layout ==
The station consists of two ground-level side platforms. There is no interconnection between the platforms; passengers wishing to change platforms must exit the station, cross via an underground passage, and re-enter from the opposite side.

=== Platforms ===
1	■ Osaka Line	for Kawachi-Kokubu, and Yamato-Yagi
2	■ Osaka Line	for Fuse and Osaka Uehommachi

== Adjacent stations ==
«	Service	»
Osaka Line (D08)
Shuntokumichi (D07)	Local	Mito (D09)
Suburban Semi-Express: Does not stop at this station
Semi-Express: Does not stop at this station
Express: Does not stop at this station
Rapid Express: Does not stop at this station

== History ==
Nagase Station opened on October 31, 1924.

== Passenger statistics ==
In fiscal 2018, the station was used by an average of 30,889 passengers daily.

== Surrounding area ==
- Kindai University

== See also ==
- List of railway stations in Japan
