= Hanaten Station =

Railway station in Osaka, Japan

Hanaten Station 放出駅
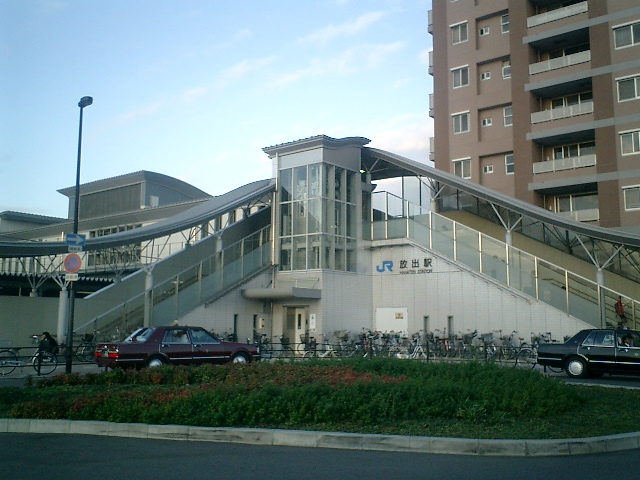
- Hanaten Station building, October 2005

General information
- Location: 21-52, Hanaten-higahshi Sanchome, Tsurumi, Osaka, Osaka （大阪市鶴見区放出東三丁目21-52） Japan
- Coordinates: 34°41′16.95″N 135°33′46.8″E
- Operator: West Japan Railway Company
- Lines: Katamachi Line (Gakkentoshi Line); Osaka Higashi Line
- Platforms: 4
- Tracks: 2
- Connections: Bus terminal

Construction
- Structure type: At-grade

Other information
- Station code: JR-H39 (Gakkentoshi Line); JR-F08 (Osaka-Higashi Line)

History
- Opened: 1895
Location

Hanaten Station (放出駅, Hanaten-eki) is a railway station owned by West Japan Railway Company (JR West) in Tsurumi-ku, Osaka, Japan.

== Lines ==
- West Japan Railway Company (JR West)
  - Katamachi Line (Gakkentoshi Line)
  - Osaka Higashi Line

== Layout ==
Hanaten Station has two island platforms with four tracks on the ground.

1	■ Gakkentoshi Line	for Shijōnawate and Matsuiyamate
2	■ Osaka Higashi Line	local trains for Takaida-Chūō and Kyūhōji direct rapid service for Ōji and Nara on weekday evenings
2	■ Gakkentoshi Line	the last train for Shijōnawate
3	■ Osaka Higashi Line	for Ōsaka
3	■ Gakkentoshi Line	for Kyōbashi, Kitashinchi and Amagasaki (part of trains on weekday mornings)
4	■ Gakkentoshi Line	for Kyōbashi, Kitashinchi and Amagasaki

== History ==
Station numbering was introduced in March 2018 with Hanaten being assigned station number JR-H39.

== Stations next to Hanaten ==
«	Service	»
Katamachi Line (Gakkentoshi Line)
Tokuan	Local	Shigino
Suminodo	Regional Rapid Service	Kyōbashi
Suminodo	Rapid Service	Kyōbashi
Osaka Higashi Line
Shigino	Local	Takaida-Chūō
JR-Awaji	Direct Rapid Service	Takaida-Chūō
