= Kyūhōji Station =

Railway station in Yao, Osaka Prefecture, Japan

Kyūhōji Station 久宝寺駅
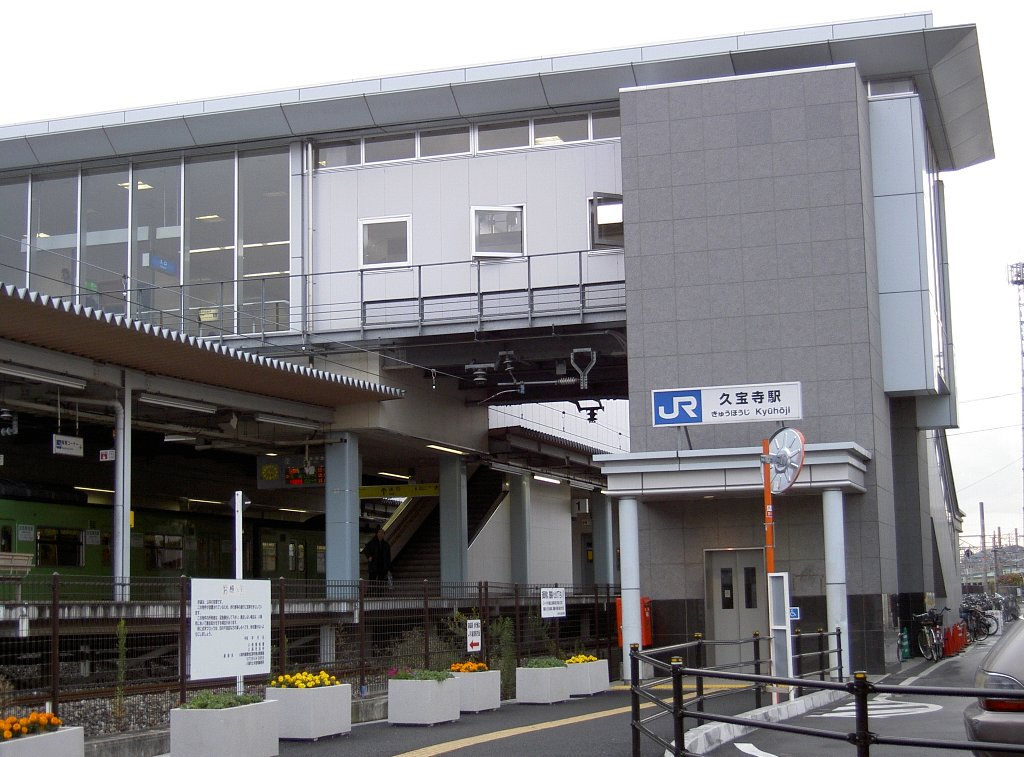
- Entrance of Kyūhōji Station, December 2005

General information
- Location: 3-1, Ryūgechō Nichome, Yao-shi, Osaka-fu 581-0069; Japan
- Coordinates: 34°37′20.46″N 135°35′3.59″E
- System: JR-West commuter rail station
- Owner: West Japan Railway Company
- Operator: West Japan Railway Company
- Lines: Q Kansai Main Line (Yamatoji Line); F Osaka Higashi Line
- Platforms: 2 island platforms
- Connections: Bus terminal

Other information
- Status: Staffed (Midori no Madoguchi)
- Station code: JR-Q24, JR-F15
- Website: Official website

History
- Opened: 1 December 1910

Passengers
- FY2019: 18,112 daily
Services
Preceding station	JR-West	Following station
Yamatoji Line (Kansai Main Line)
Yao	Local	Kami
Ōji	Regional Rapid Service	Tennōji
Ōji	Rapid Service	Tennōji
Kashiwara	Rapid Service starting Kashiwara for JR Namba	Tennōji
Ōji	Yamatoji Rapid Service	Tennōji
Osaka Higashi Line
Shin-Kami	Local	Terminus
JR Kawachi-Eiwa	Direct Rapid Service	Ōji (Yamatoji Line)
Location
- Location within Osaka Prefecture Location within Japan

Kyūhōji Station (久宝寺駅, Kyūhōji-eki) is an interchange passenger railway station located in the city of Yao, Osaka, Japan, operated by West Japan Railway Company (JR West).

== Lines ==
Kyūhōji Station is served by the Kansai Main Line (Yamatoji Line), and is located 164.3 kilometers from the terminus of the line at Nagoya Station and 43.4 kilometers from Kamo. It is also served by the Osaka Higashi Line, and is 20.2 kilometers from the terminus of that line at Shin-Osaka Station.

== Layout ==
The station consists of two island platforms serving four tracks, connected by an elevated station building. The station has a Midori no Madoguchi staffed ticket office.

=== Platforms ===
1, 2	■ Yamatoji Line	for Ōji, Nara and Takada
2	■ Yamatoji Line	direct rapid service from the Osaka Higashi Line for Ōji and Nara in the evening
3	■ Yamatoji Line	for Tennōji, JR Namba and Osaka
3	■ Osaka Higashi Line	for Shin-Kami and Hanaten direct rapid service for Kyōbashi and Kitashinchi
4	■ Yamatoji Line	for Tennōji, JR Namba and Osaka

== History ==
The station opened on 1 December 1910. With the privatization of Japanese National Railways (JNR) on 1 April 1987, the station came under the control of JR West.

Station numbering was introduced in March 2018 with Kyūhōji being assigned station number JR-Q24 or the Yamatoji Line and JR-F15 for the Osaka-Higashi Line.

== Passenger statistics ==
In fiscal 2019, the station was used by an average of 18,112 passengers daily (boarding passengers only).

== Surrounding Area ==
- Kyūhō-ji temple
- Yao City Hospital

== See also ==
- List of railway stations in Japan
