= Tosaka-dera =

Asuka period Buddhist temple ruins

Tosaka-dera ruins
- 鳥坂寺跡 (Japanese)
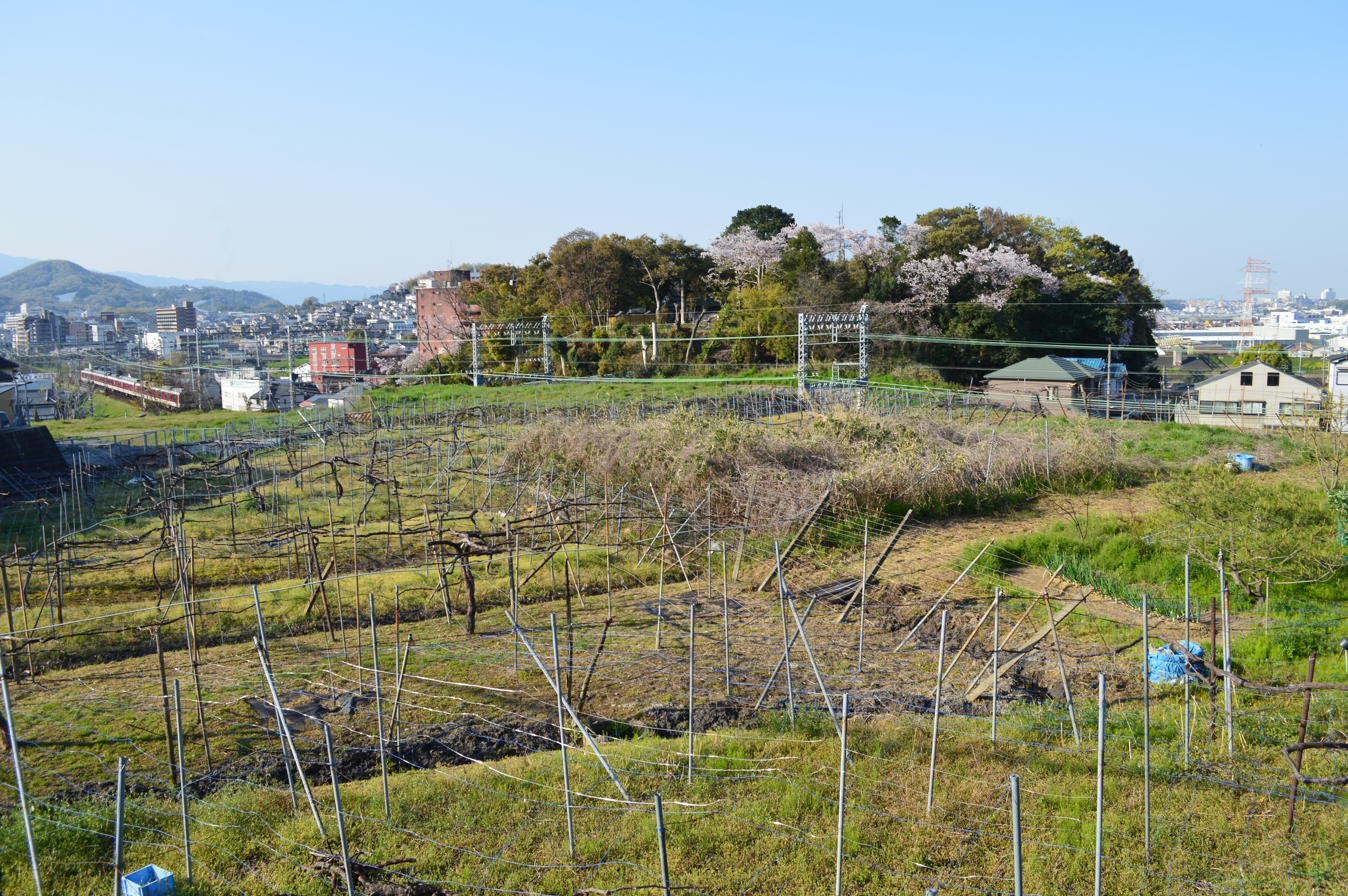
- Panoramic view of Tosaka-dera site

- Tosaka-dera ruins Tosaka-dera (Japan)
- Interactive map of Tosaka-dera ruins
- 34°34′27.18″N 135°38′0.15″E
- Type: temple ruins
- Periods: Asuka period
- Location: Kashiwara, Osaka, Japan
- Region: Kansai region

History
- Built: 7th century AD

Site notes
- Public access: Yes

The Tosaka-dera (鳥坂寺, Tosaka-dera) was an Asuka period Buddhist temple located in the Takaida neighborhood of the city of Kashiwara, Osaka, Japan. The temple no longer exists, but the temple grounds were designated as a National Historic Site in 2012. The site was formerly referred to as the Takaida temple ruins (高井田廃寺, Takaida haiji) until positively identified in 1983.

== Overview ==
The Tosaka-dera ruins are located on a hill at the end of the Ikoma Mountains, on the north bank of the Yamato River near where it enters the Osaka Plains. Currently, the tracks of the Kintetsu Railway Kintetsu Osaka Line cuts through the site. In the surrounding area are many ancient remains, including the Hiraoyama Kofun Cluster. It is one of the "Six temple of Kawachi" visited by Empress Kōken in 756 per the Shoku Nihongi.

The construction date of this temple is unknown. According to archaeological excavations, it is estimated to have been built around the latter half of the 7th century during the Asuka period. It was found that the temple was built by destroying a kofun burial mound and flattening the site, which is an extremely rare occurrence. Fragments of haniwa, "fukiishi" and pottery from the early Kofun period are found in the ground leveling soil on the site. Excavations have confirmed the foundations of the Kondō, Three-story Pagoda. Lecture Hall, Refectory and cloister. The site is restricted by topography, and the arrangement of the buildings was therefore different than for contemporary flatland temples.The temple area was found two be roughly two chō on a side of roughly 216 meters. There was no moat or surrounding enclosure.The South Gate, Middle Gate, Main Hall and Lecture Hall were arranged in a straight line from the south, and the cloister emerges from the sides of the Middle Gate and extend to the Lecture Hall, encircling the Main Hall. The Pagoda was in the southwest and various service buildings, including the monk's quarters, were in the southeast.

The Main Hall had a platform 15 x 18 meters, which was raised 1.4 meters, made of cut blocks of tuff, and the stairs were found to be in very good preservation; however, the site has been damaged by the railway tracks. The pagoda had an estimated base dimensions of 8.66 meters square, which translates to a three-story tower with a height of about 20 meters. The temple appears to have been rebuilt on several occasions before finally becoming abandoned in the 10th century.

Artifacts recovered from the site include roof tiles, of which the style of the eaves tiles has the characteristics of similar tiles found on the Korean Peninsula, and this points to the possible association of the temple with toraijin immigrants, as it is recorded that many immigrants from Baekje settled in this area of Kawachi Province. Other finds included Haji earthenware, many of which have been ink-painted or inscribed with the name "Tosaka-ji". The artifacts have been designated a Tangible Cultural Property of Kashihara city.

The site was first excavated in 1929, during which time a large Shibi decorative ridge tile was discovered. This artifact is currently at the Tokyo National Museum. Further excavations were conducted from 1961 to 1962 when the site was endangered by the construction of a housing project. A further excavation took place from 1982 to 1984, which further discovered more of the foundations of the central portion of the temple, and again in 1989, in conjunction with the reconstruction of the Amayu Kawada Jinja, a Shinto shrine which now occupies the site of the Pagoda.

The temple site is about an 8-minute walk from Takaida Station on the JR West Kansai Main Line.

== Gallery ==
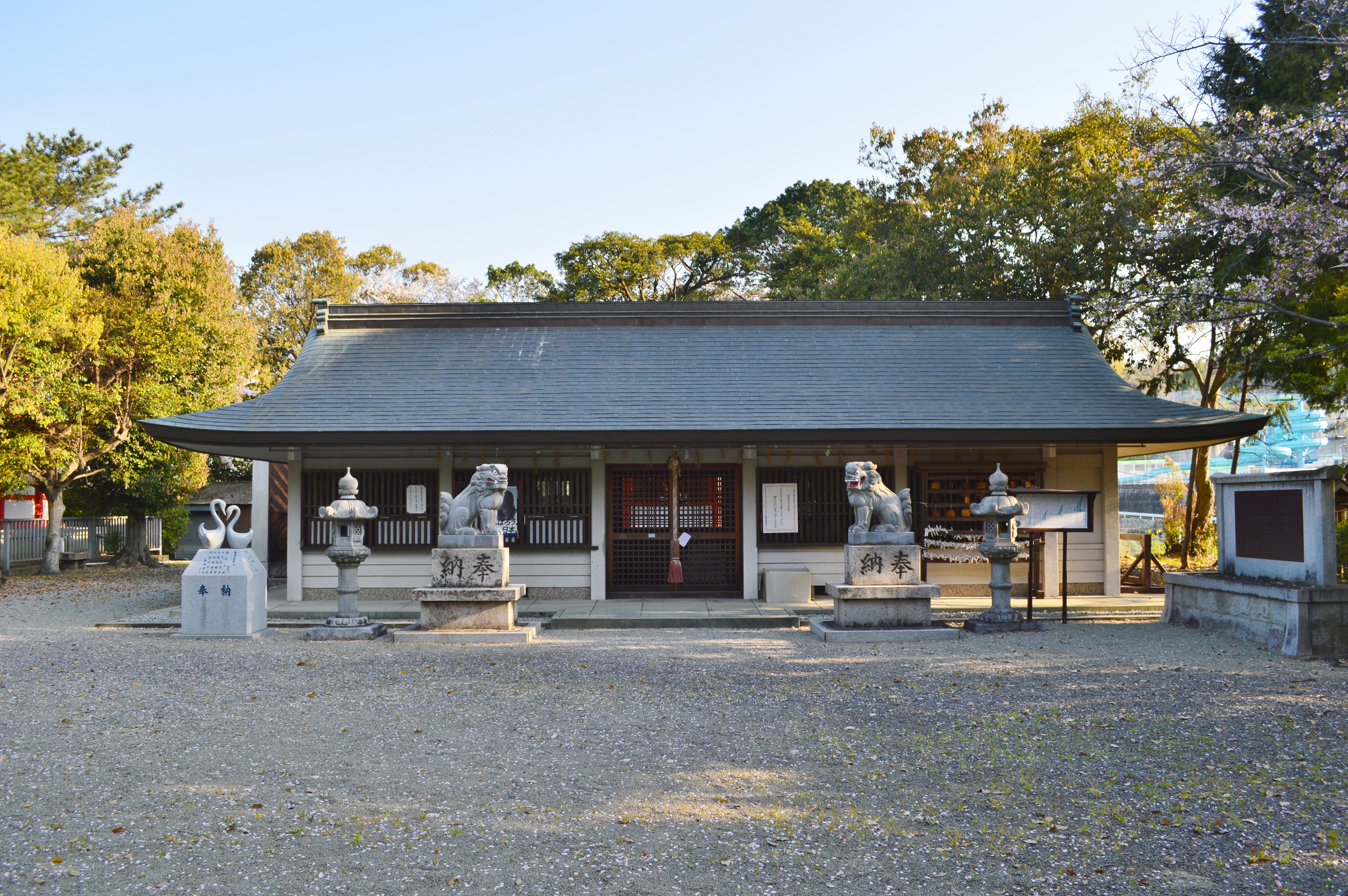
Amayu Kawada Jinja, built on the pagoda site

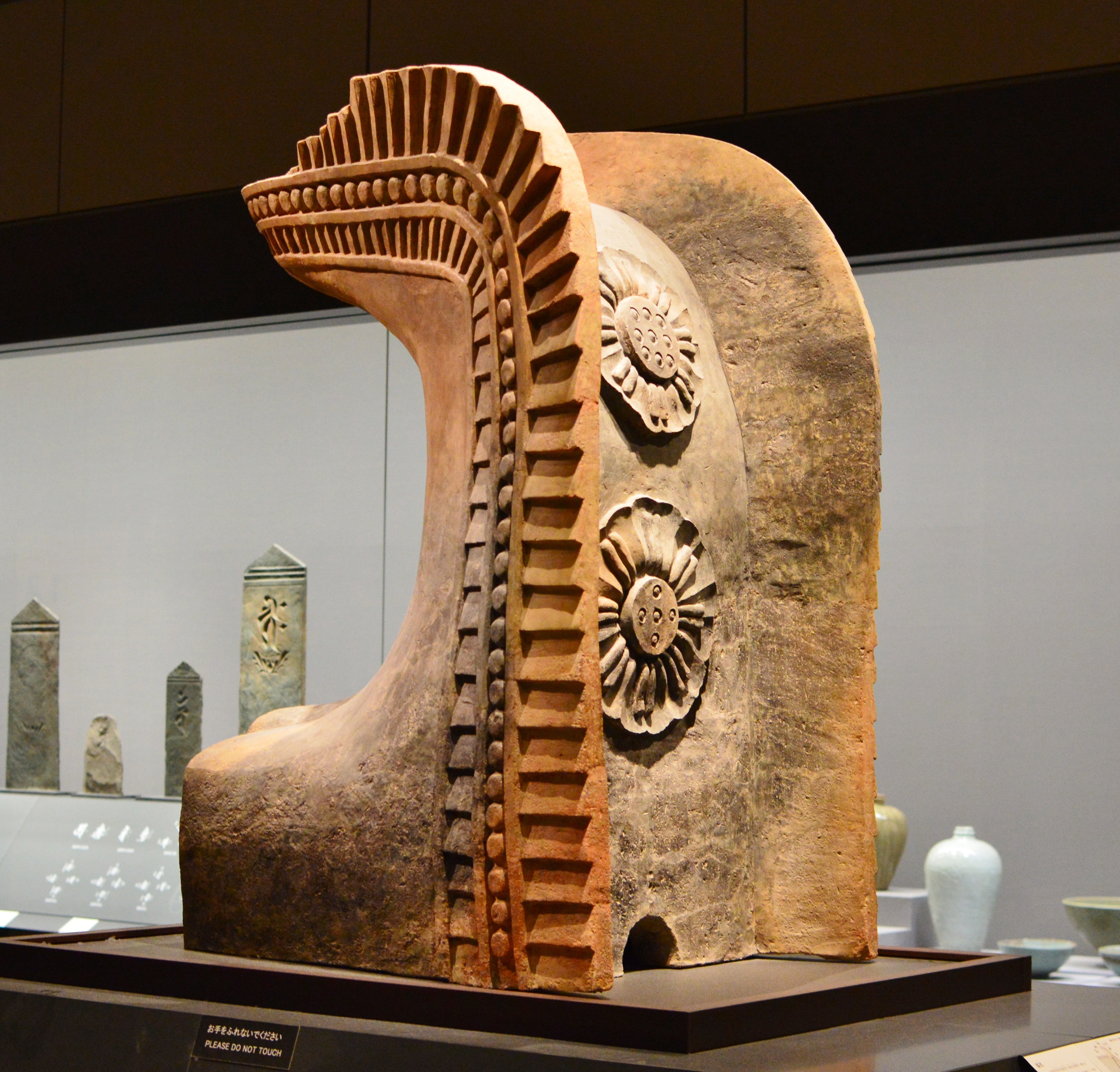
Shibi Decorative ridge tile

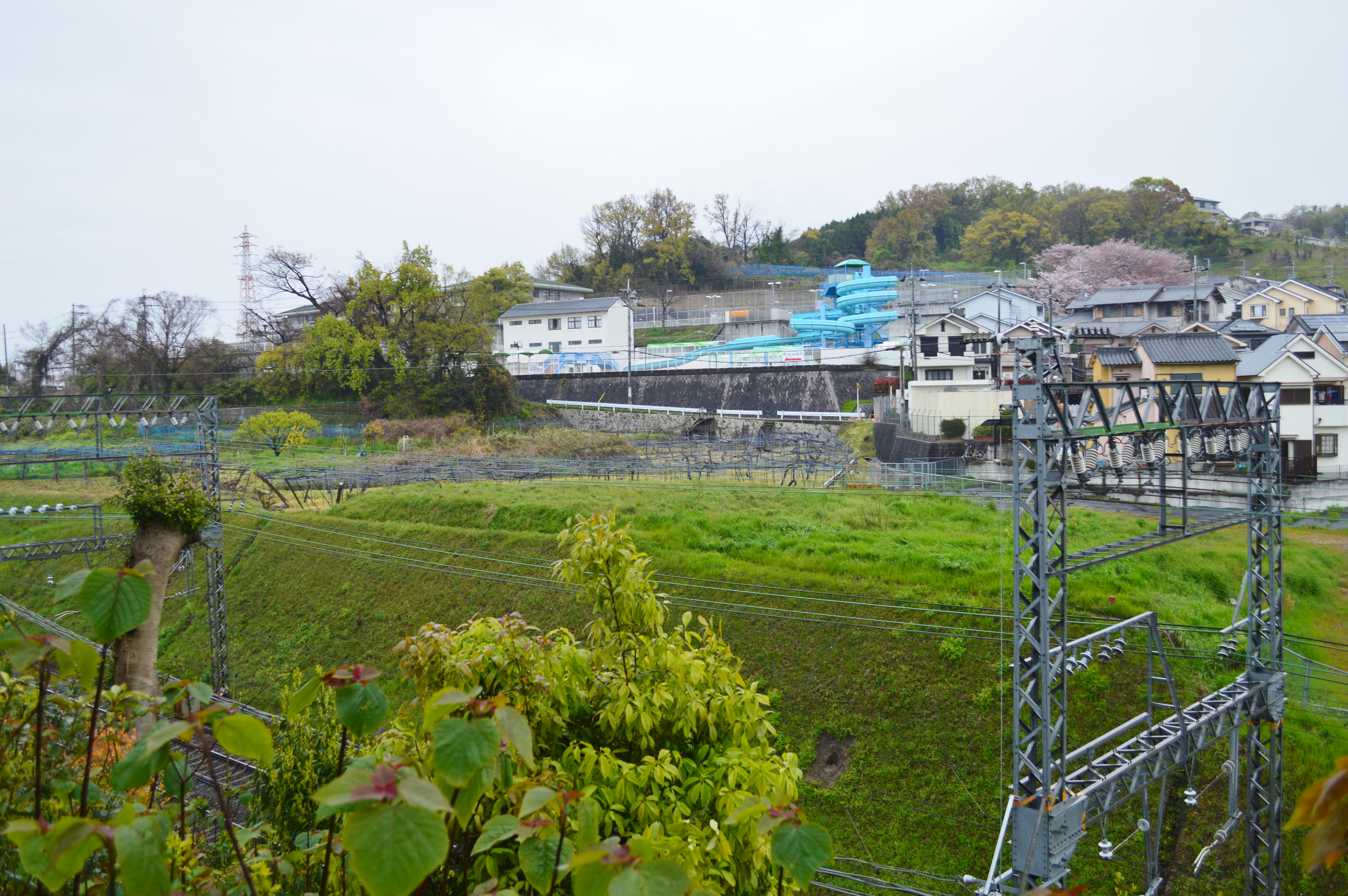
Sites of the Kondo, Lecture Hall from the Pagoda

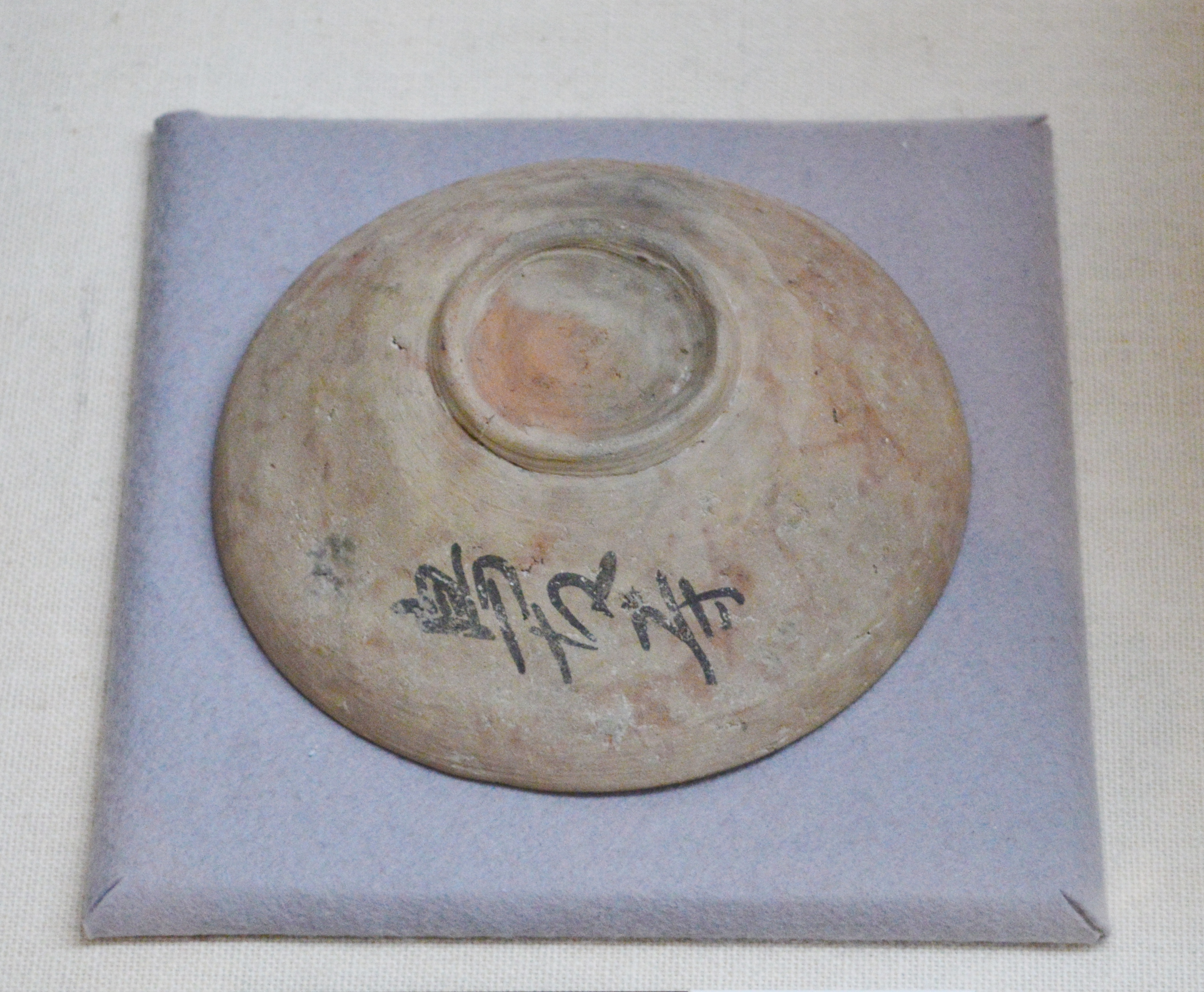
bowl inscribed "Tosaka-dera"

== See also ==
- List of Historic Sites of Japan (Osaka)
