= Tanabe temple ruins =

Hakuhō period Buddhist temple ruins

- 高宮廃寺跡 (Japanese)
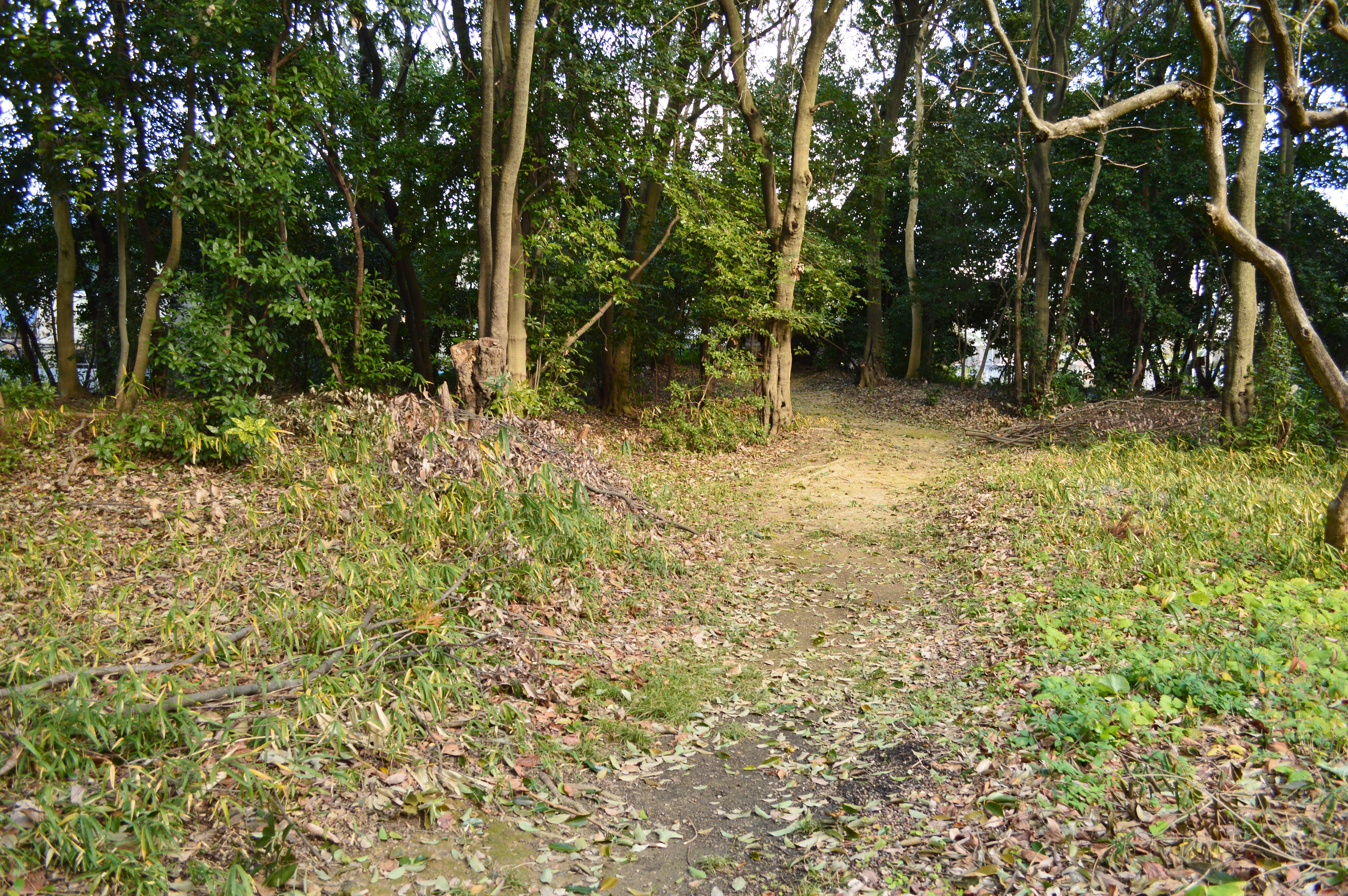
- Tanabe temple ruins

- Tanabe temple ruins Tanabe temple ruins (Japan)
- Interactive map of Tanabe temple ruins
- 34°33′37.55″N 135°38′32.93″E
- Type: temple ruins
- Periods: Hakuhō period
- Location: Kashiwara, Osaka, Japan
- Region: Kansai region

Site notes
- Public access: Yes

The Tanabe temple ruins (田辺廃寺跡, Tanabe Haiji ato), is an archaeological site with the ruins of a Hakuhō period Buddhist temple located in the Tanabe neighborhood of the city of Kashiwara, Osaka, Japan. The name of the temple is unknown, and no structures remain, but the temple grounds were designated as a National Historic Site in 1975.

== Overview ==
The Tanabe temple ruins are located on a hill at the confluence of the Yamato River and he Ishikawa Rivers, and at a key point where the two highways leading from ancient Namba to Yamato Province meet. The site is within the precincts of a Shinto shrine, the Kasuga Jinja. Per an archaeological excavation carried out in 1971, the foundations of a temple with a layout based on Yakushi-ji in Nara was discovered. At that time, the foundations of the South Gate, East and West Pagodas and Kondo were found. The site of the Lecture Hall and monk's quarters remains uncertain, as much of the land in this area has been disturbed. Recovered artifacts included a large variety of roof tiles ranging from the Hakuhō through the Muromachi period, iron nails, Sue ware and Haji ware pottery and wooden objects were discovered. The temple area is estimated to be about 110 meters square.

The temple was founded around the end of the 7th century and construction progressed into the first half of the 8th century, or the Nara period. As the area is known to have been settled by the Tanabe clan, an immigrant clan from Baekje, the temple is believed to have been their clan temple. It was burnt down around the early Heian period, and it is presumed that only the Main Hall was rebuilt. The temple was finally abandoned completely in the Muromachi period.

The temple site is about a 15-minute walk from Kawachi-Kokubu Station on the Kintetsu Railway Kintetsu Osaka Line.

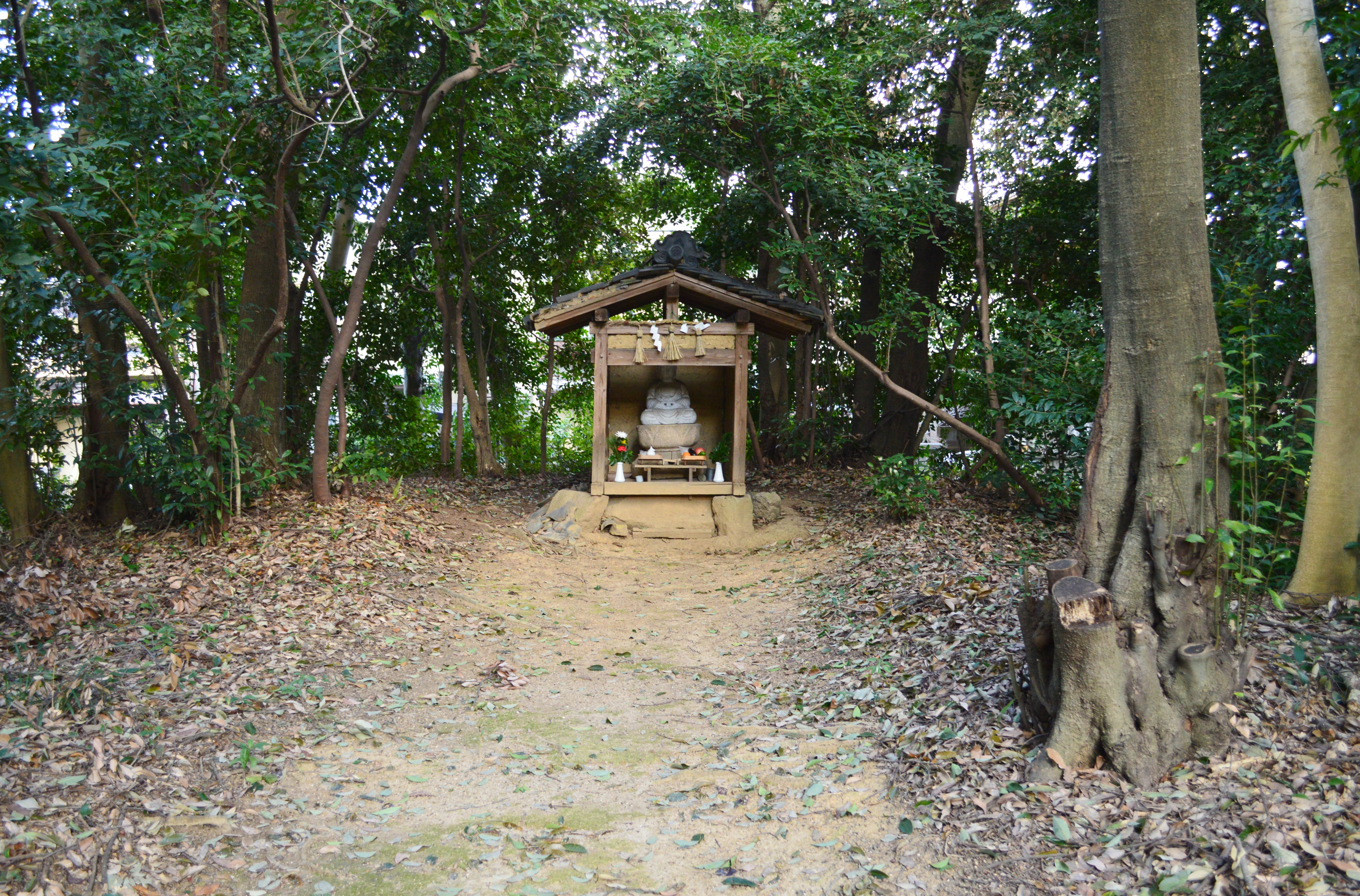
Site of Kōdō (Lecture Hall)

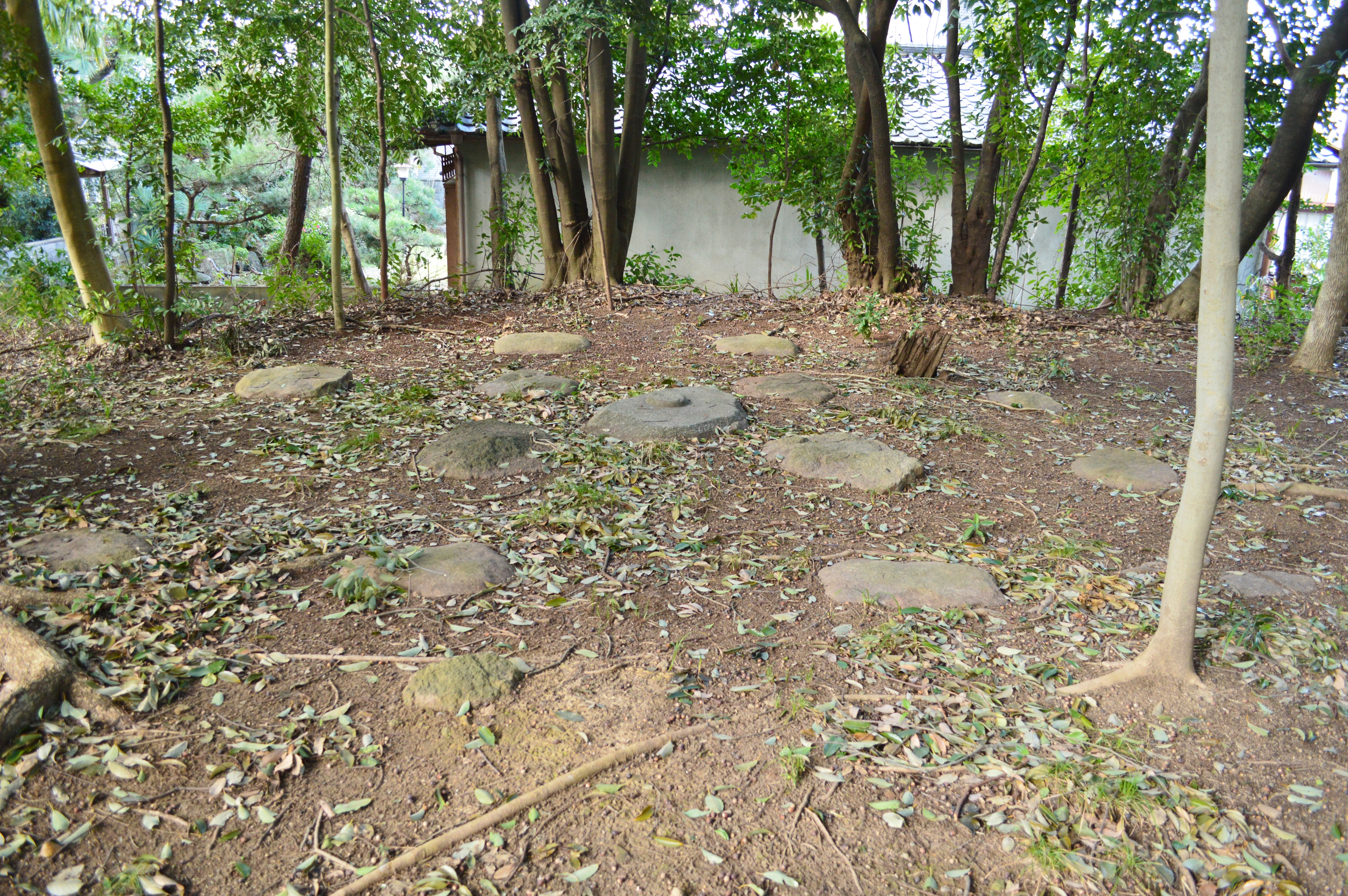
Site of West Pagoda

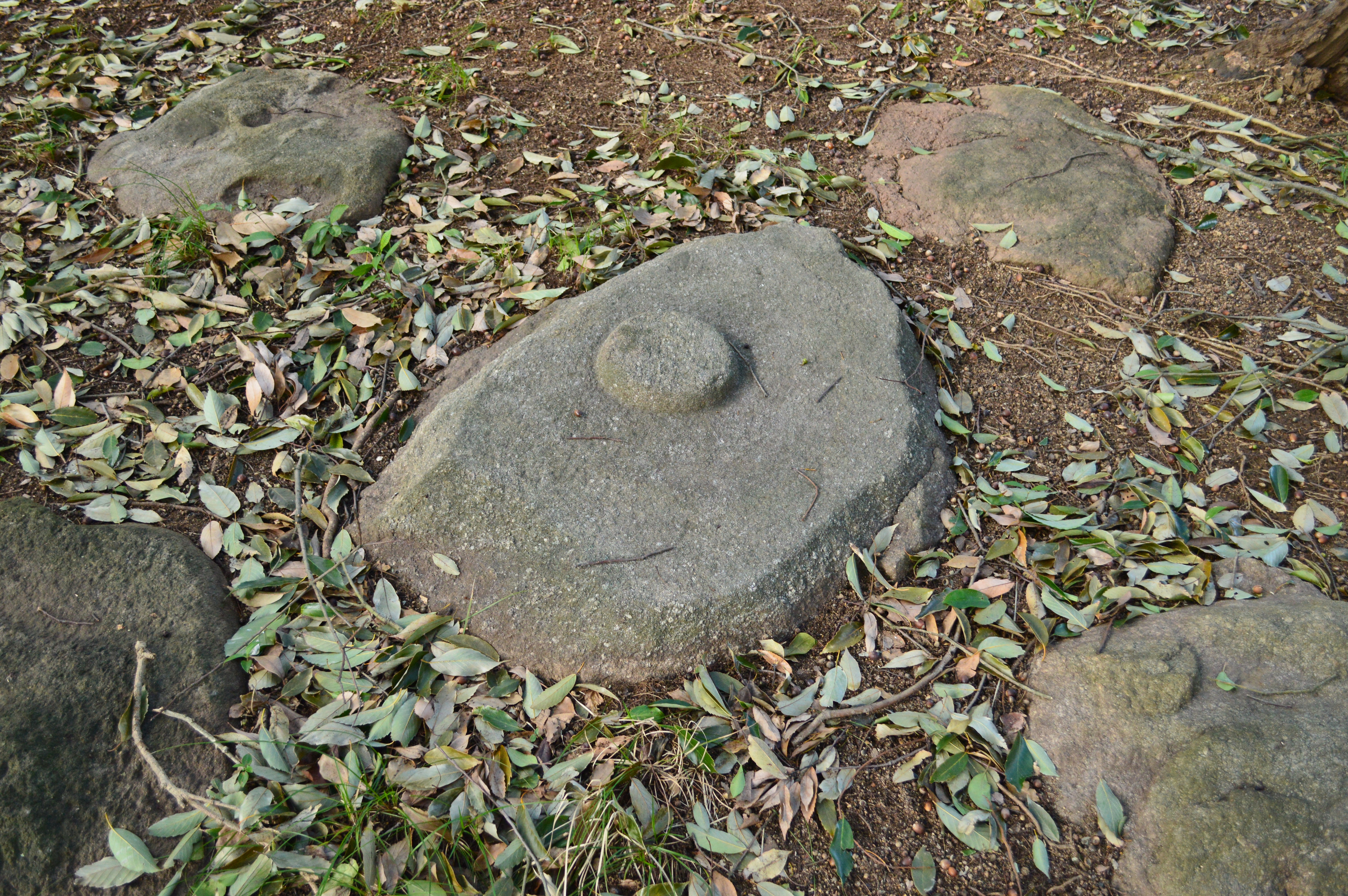
West Pagoda centerblock

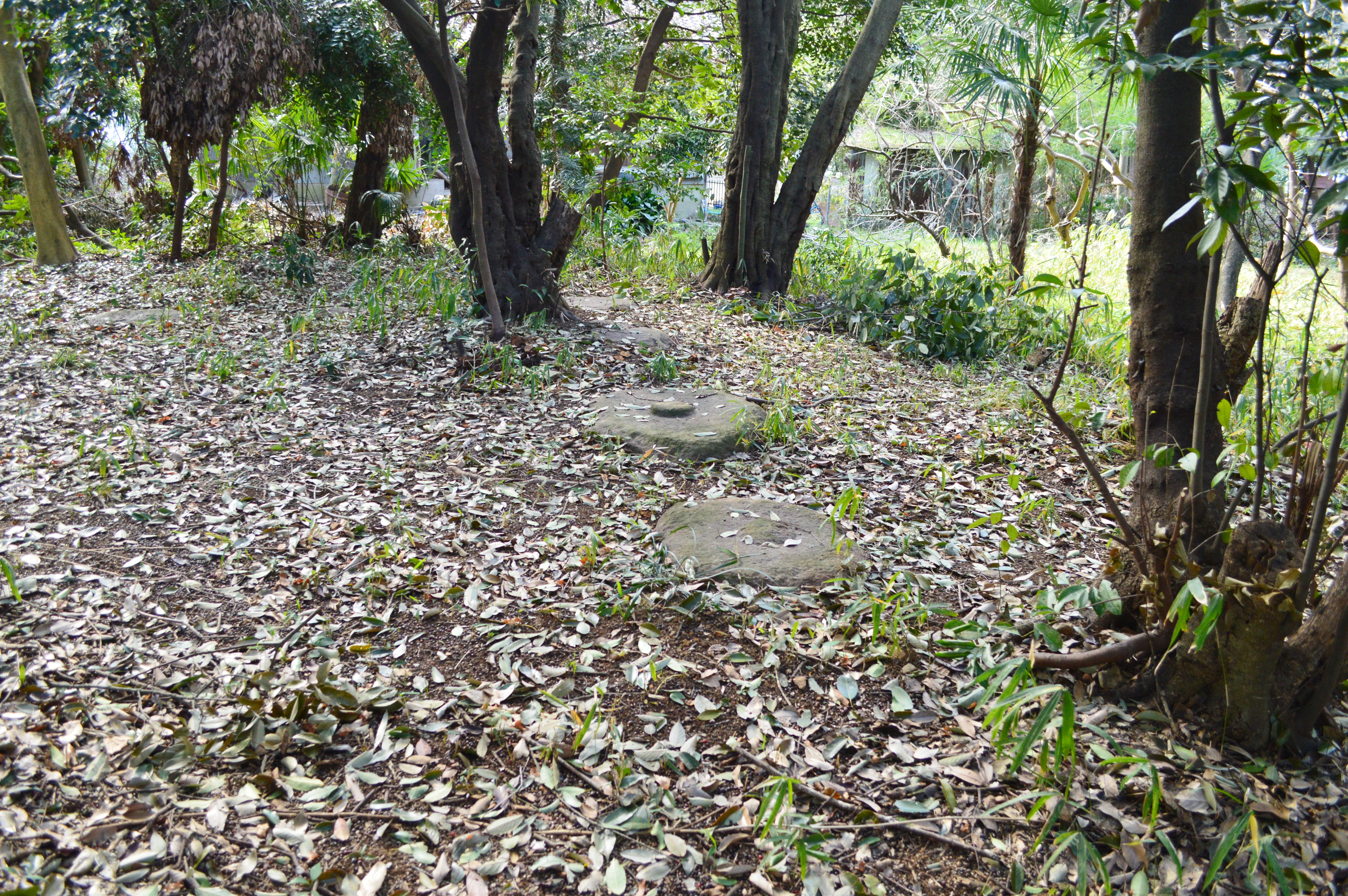
Site of East Pagoda

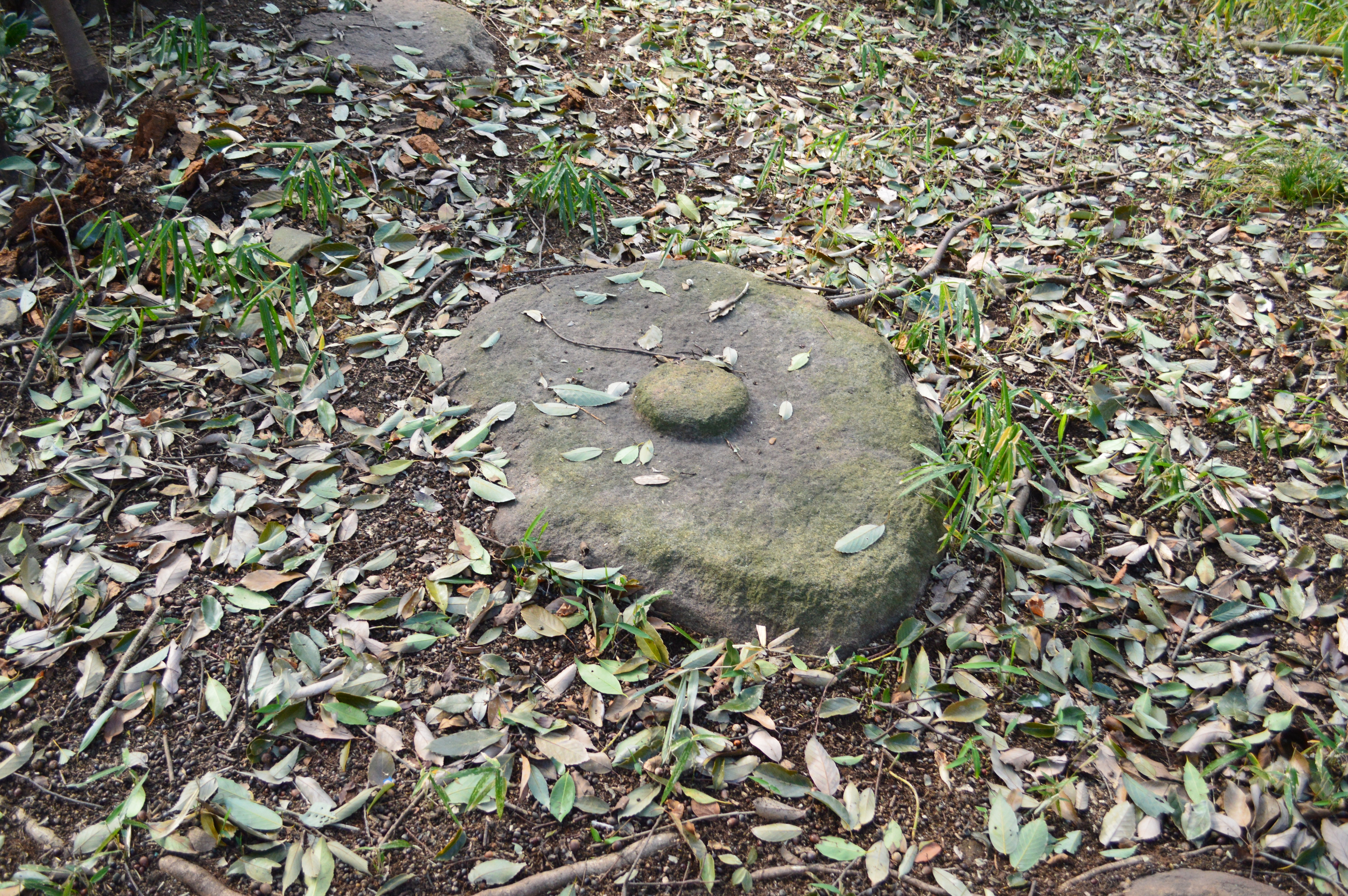
East Pagoda centerblock

== See also ==
- List of Historic Sites of Japan (Osaka)
