= Takaida Cave Tombs =

Cluster of Corridor-type Kofun Tomb in Osaka, Japan

- 高井田横穴墓群 (Japanese)
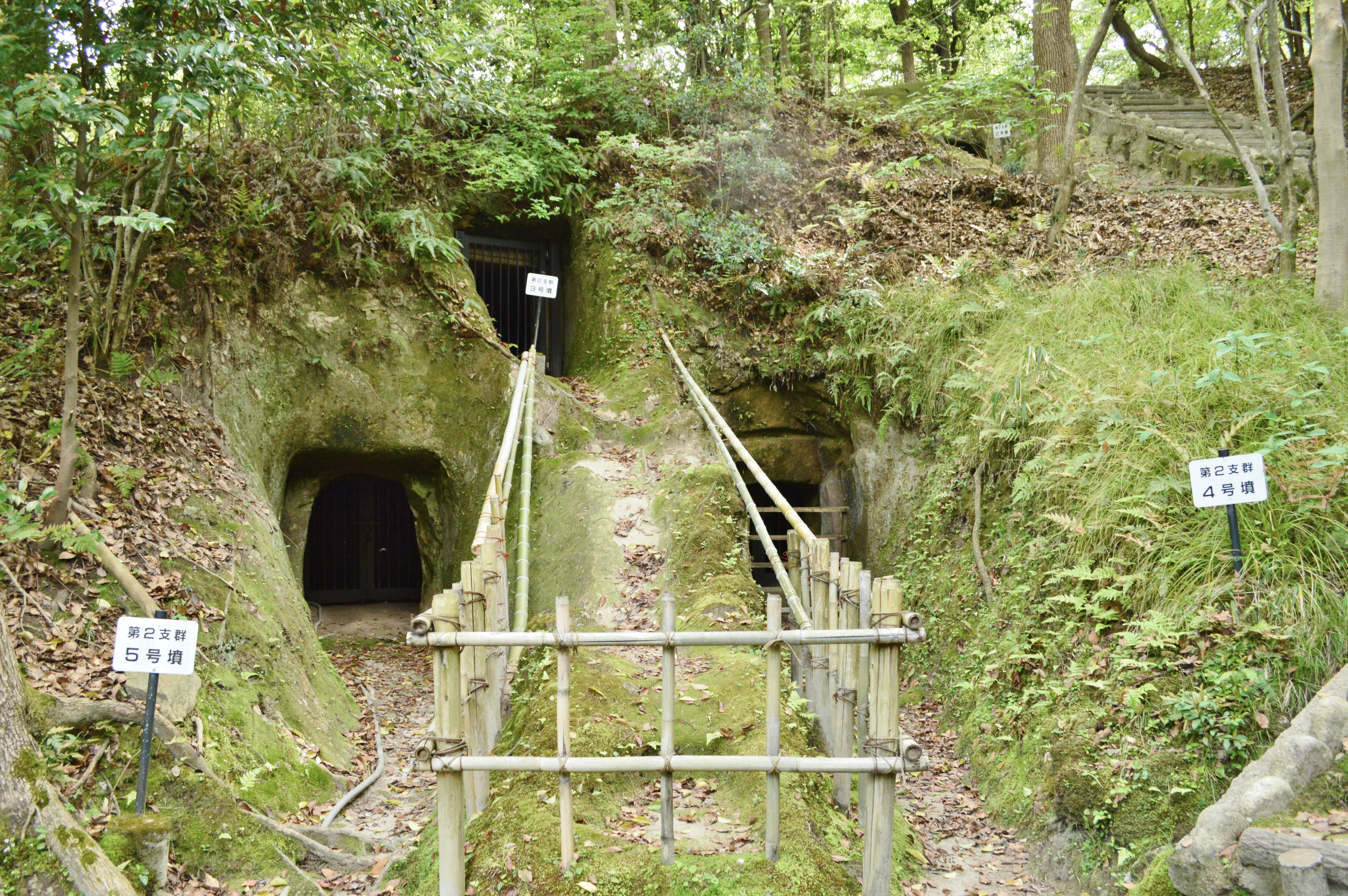
- Takaida Cave Tombs, No. 3, 4, 5 of the 2nd branch

- Takaida Cave Tombs Takaida Cave Tombs (Japan)
- Interactive map of Takaida Cave Tombs
- 34°34′22.3″N 135°38′16.6″E
- Type: Yokoanabo
- Periods: Kofun period
- Location: Kashiwara, Osaka, Japan
- Region: Kansai region

History
- Built: c.late 4th century

Site notes
- Public access: Yes (Park, Museum)

The Takaida Cave Tombs (高井田横穴墓群, Takaida yokoana) is a cluster of yokoanabo tombs dug in artificial caves in a tuff cliff of located in the Takaida neighborhood of city of Kashiwara, Osaka, in the Kansai region of Japan. It was designated as a National Historic Site in 1922, with the area under protection expanded 1990.

== Overview ==
The Takaida Cave Tombs are located on the southernmost tip of the Ikoma Mountains, on the slope of a tuff hill facing the Yamato River at an elevation of 30 to 50 meters. 162 tombs have been found on the site, though it is believed many remain undiscovered, likely bringing the total to over 200. Each of the tombs have an opening approximately one meter square, with a narrow entrance tunnel leading to a larger chamber within, up to nine square meters in area with a ceiling of 170 to 180 centimeters in height. About half of the tombs have a step cut to a width of about 10 centimeters at the boundary between the wall and the ceiling. This is of unknown purpose, but is thought to resemble the eaves of a house. There were uptown three buries in a single typically in wooden coffins whose presence and size can be determined by the position of nails found on the floor of the tombs. However, a large percentage of tombs had no nails, so it is uncertain if some burials were without coffins, or else coffins were made without the use of nails. The burials were also made with the head facing north, regardless of the orientation of the entry to the tomb. A few tombs have a built-in stone sarcophagus, which was presumably cloned out and reed for subsequent burials. The tombs are in clusters with two to four tombs forming a unit, with between 10 and 15 units in a cluster, presumably corresponding to familial and clan groupings. The tombs are noted for a profusion of line engravings, depicting people, ships, birds, horses, fish, trees, flowers, swirls, suns, houses, etc. Some of the drawings show details such as the clothes of the people and the gondola-like shape of the hull of a boat. Grave goods including earrings, beads and other jewelry, horse harnesses and red-pigmented pottery has also been found. Construction began in the first half of the 6th century and seems to have continued until the 7th century. The site was discovered in 1917, but since many tombs have been open for a long time, it has not been confirmed whether all of the drawings are contemporary with the original construction.

There is also considerable speculation as to who made this cluster of tombs, as this style is very rare for the Kansai region of Japan, and no settlement traces have been found in the near vicinity. The construction techniques and arrangement of bodies is similar to site sin the Higo region of Kyushu, whereas the style of clothing depicted in the drawings and depictions of boats point to a continental influence. On the other hand, votive kamado rice cookers, a common offering in toraijin tombs of settlers from Baekje have been found in only two of the tombs, and similar contemporary cave tomb clusters on the Korean Peninsula are not similar in style.

The site has is open to the public as the Takaida Yokoana Park, and the grave goods excavated from the tombs are displayed at the adjacent Kashiwara City History Museum. Then site is a short walk from Takaida Station on the JR West Kansai Main Line.

== Gallery ==
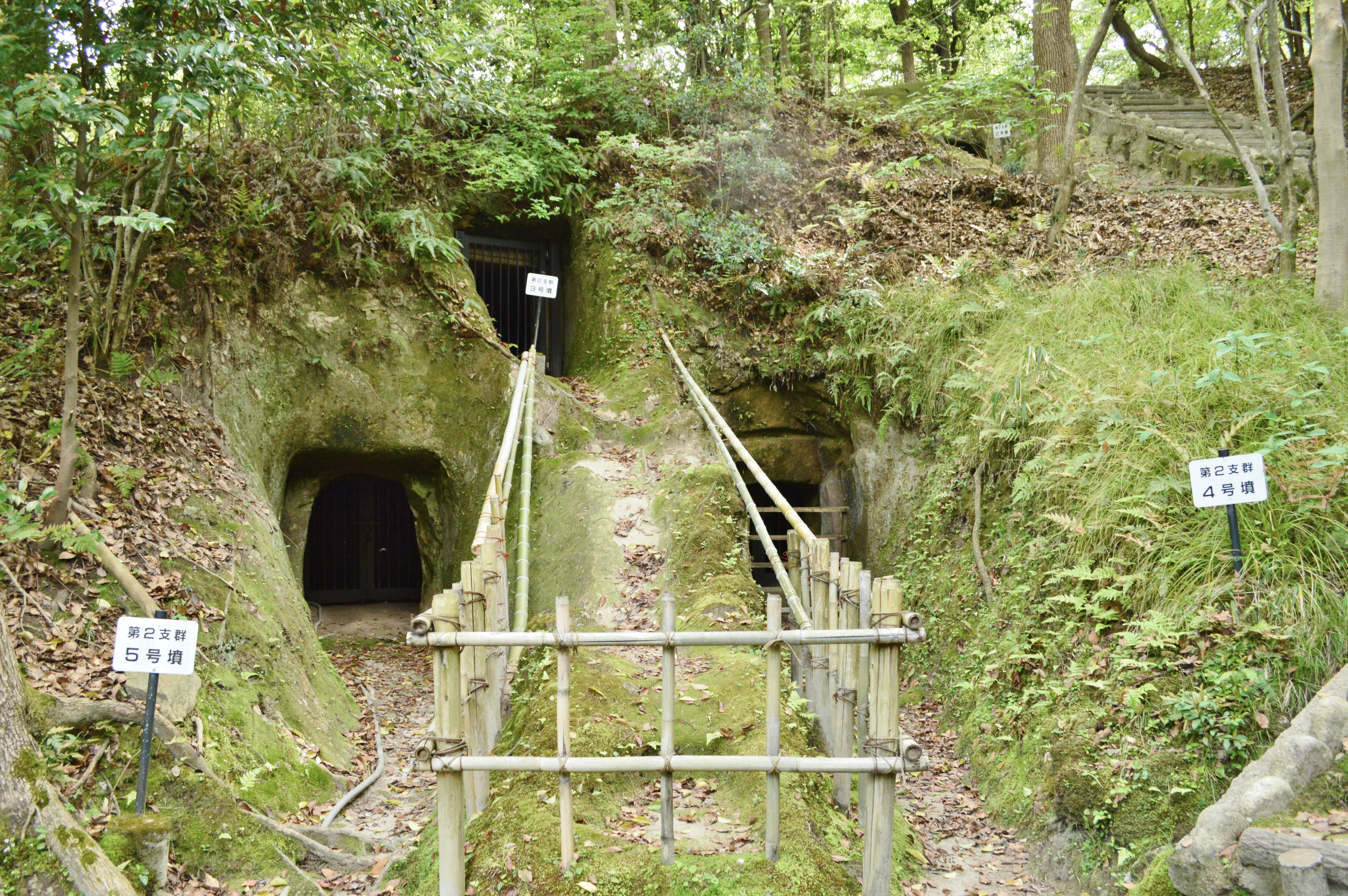
No. 3, 4, 5 of the 2nd branch

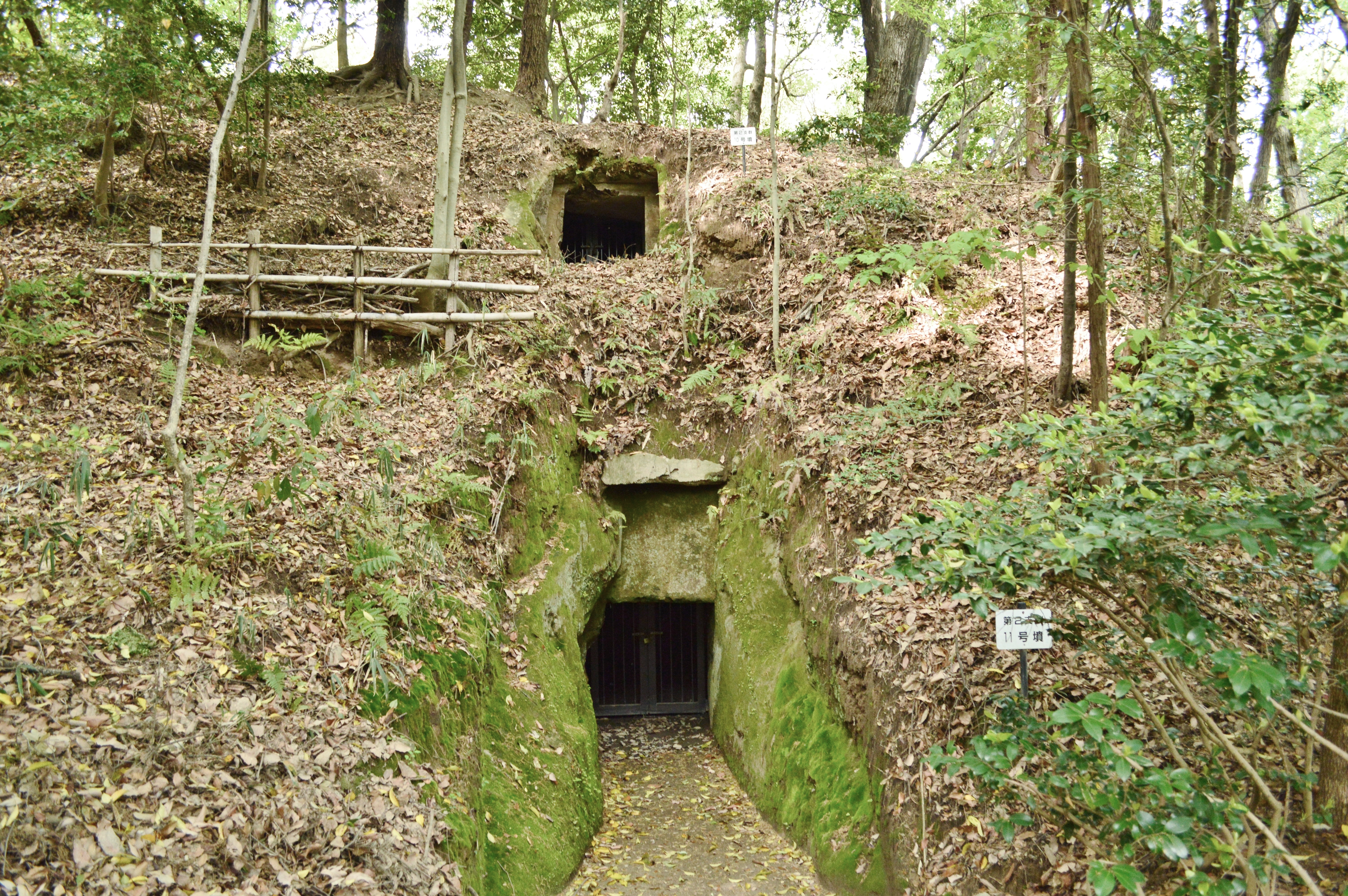
No. 10, 11 of the 2nd branch

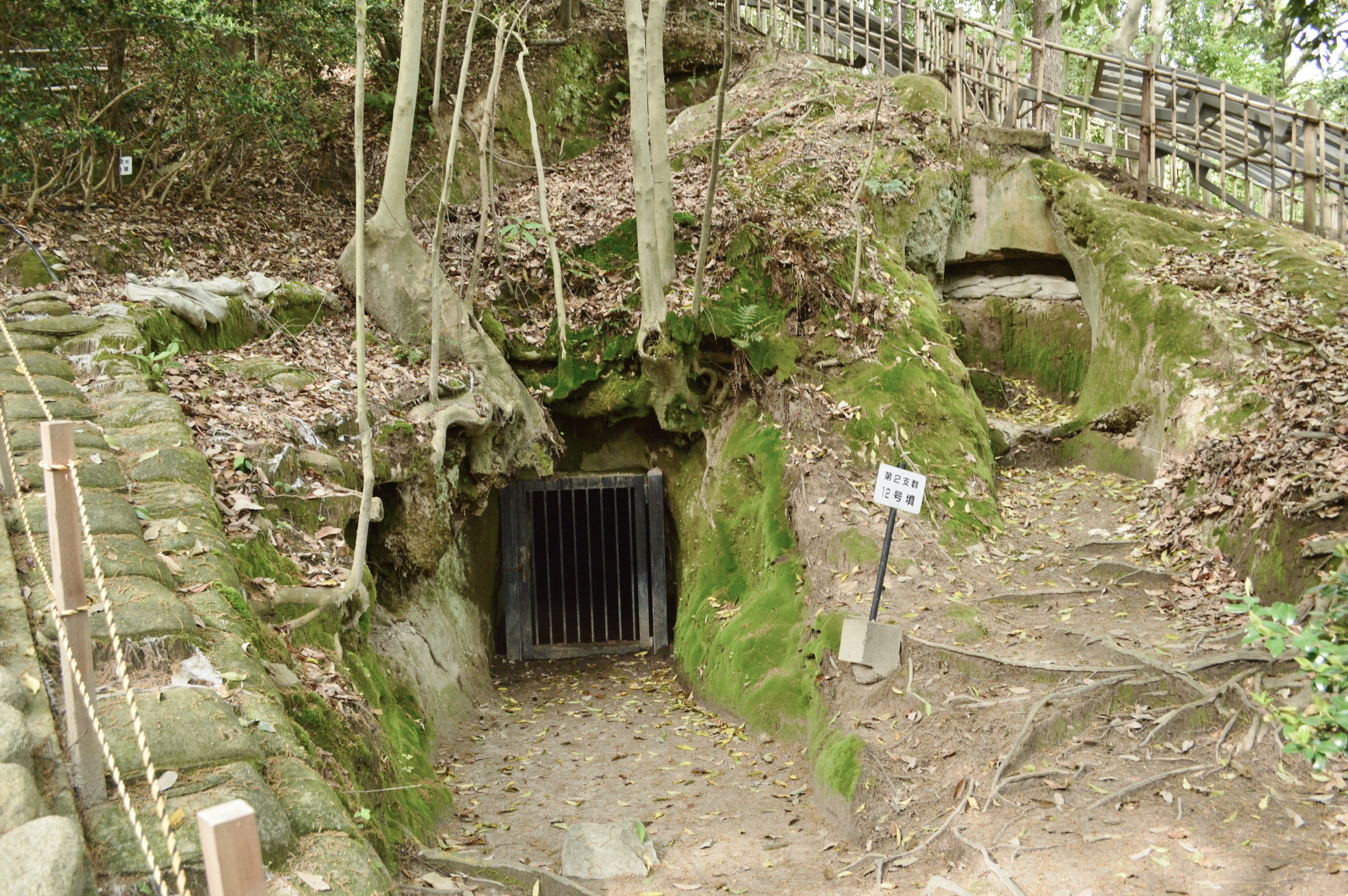
No. 12 of the 2nd branch

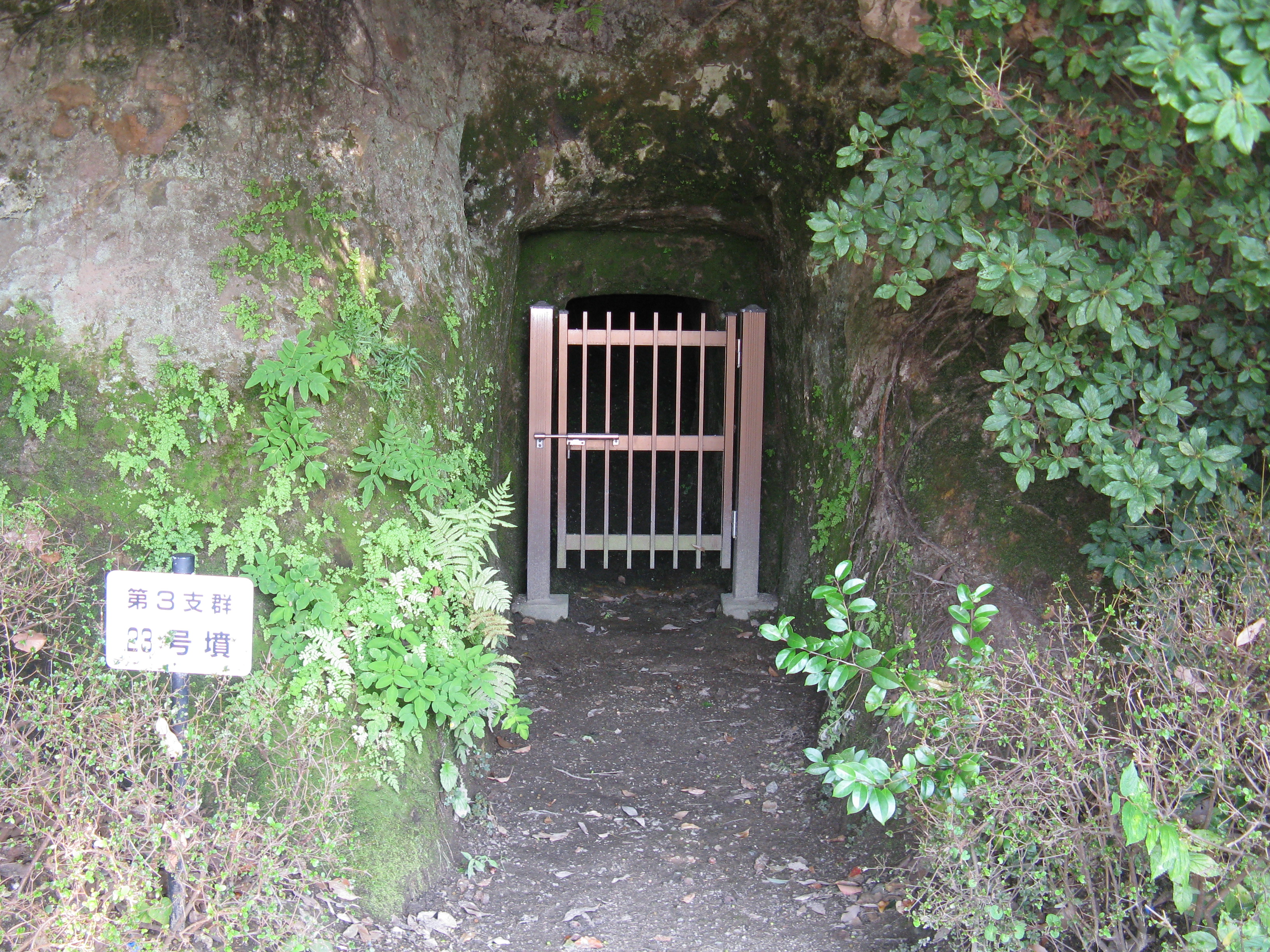
Group 3 No. 23

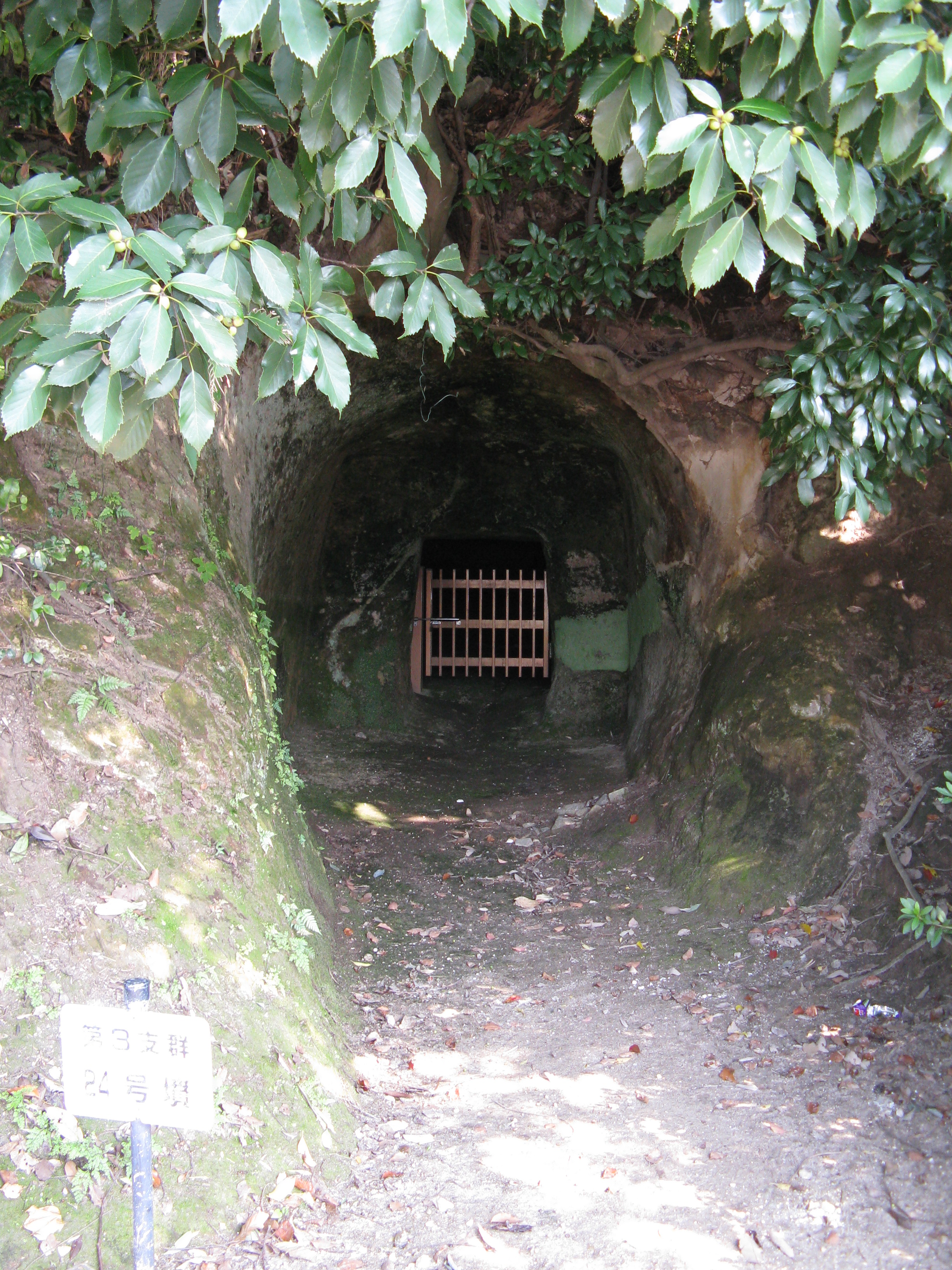
Group 3 No. 24

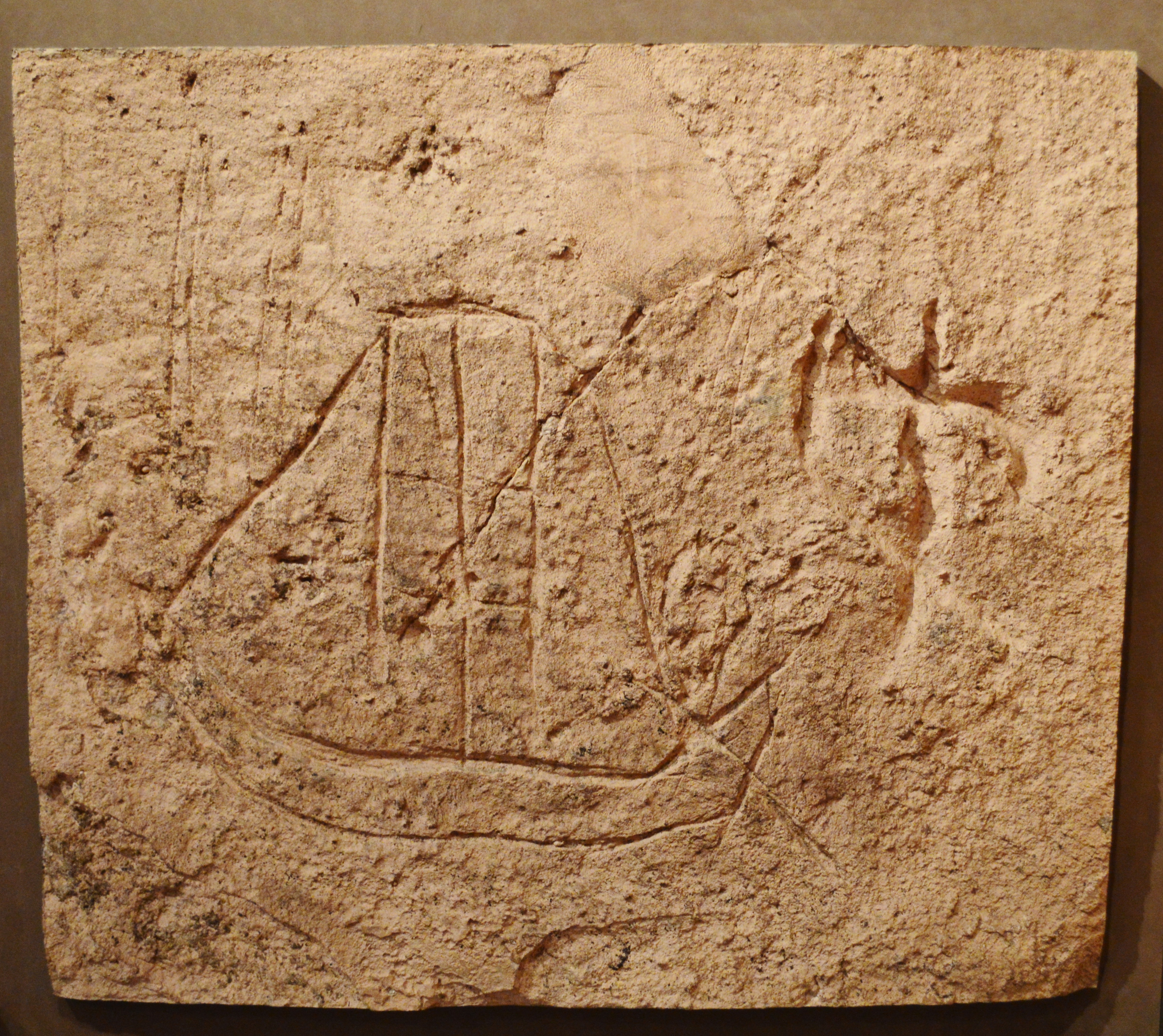
No. 2 branch group No. 12 engraved right wall painting

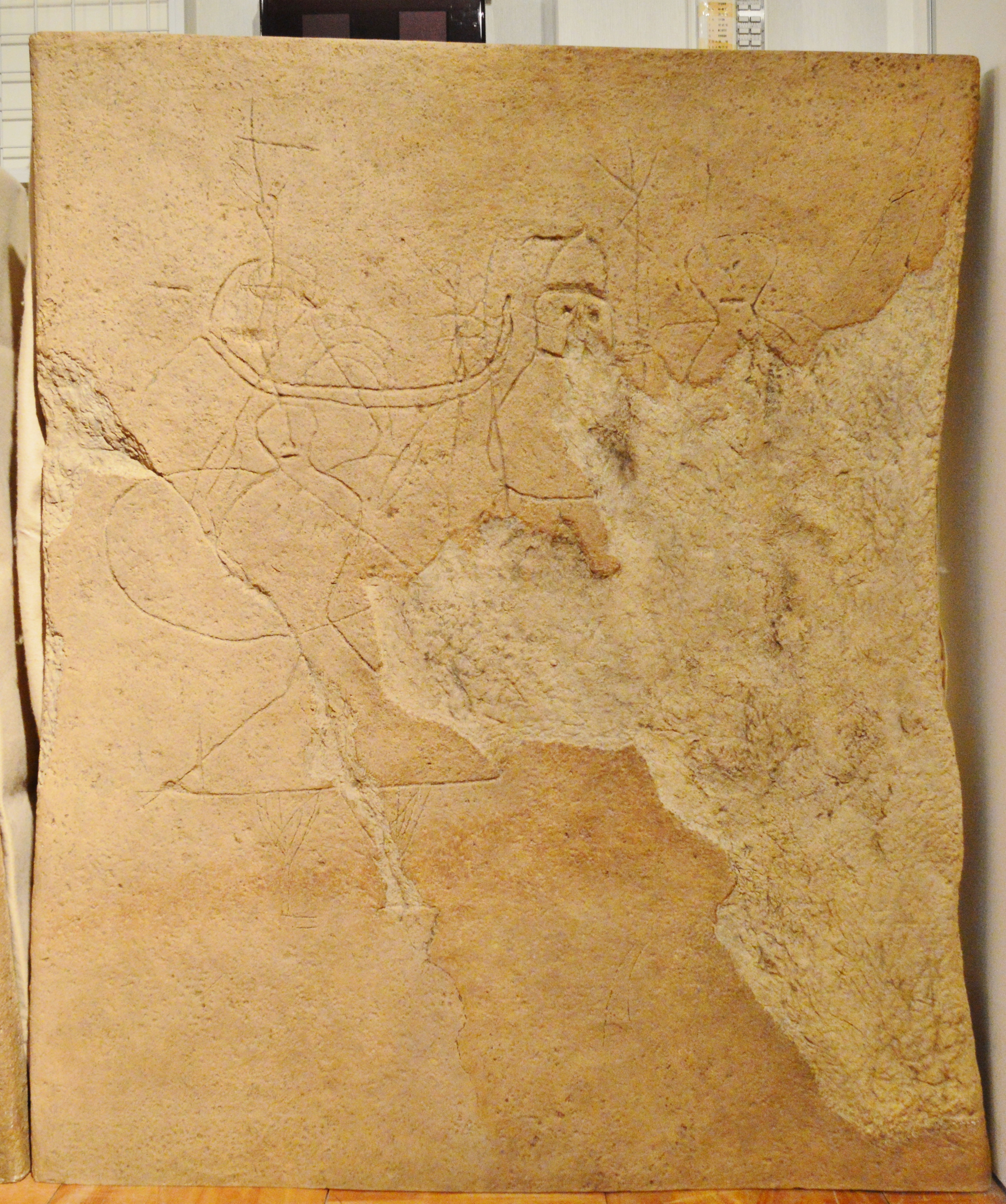
No. 3 branch group No. 5 engraved petroglyph

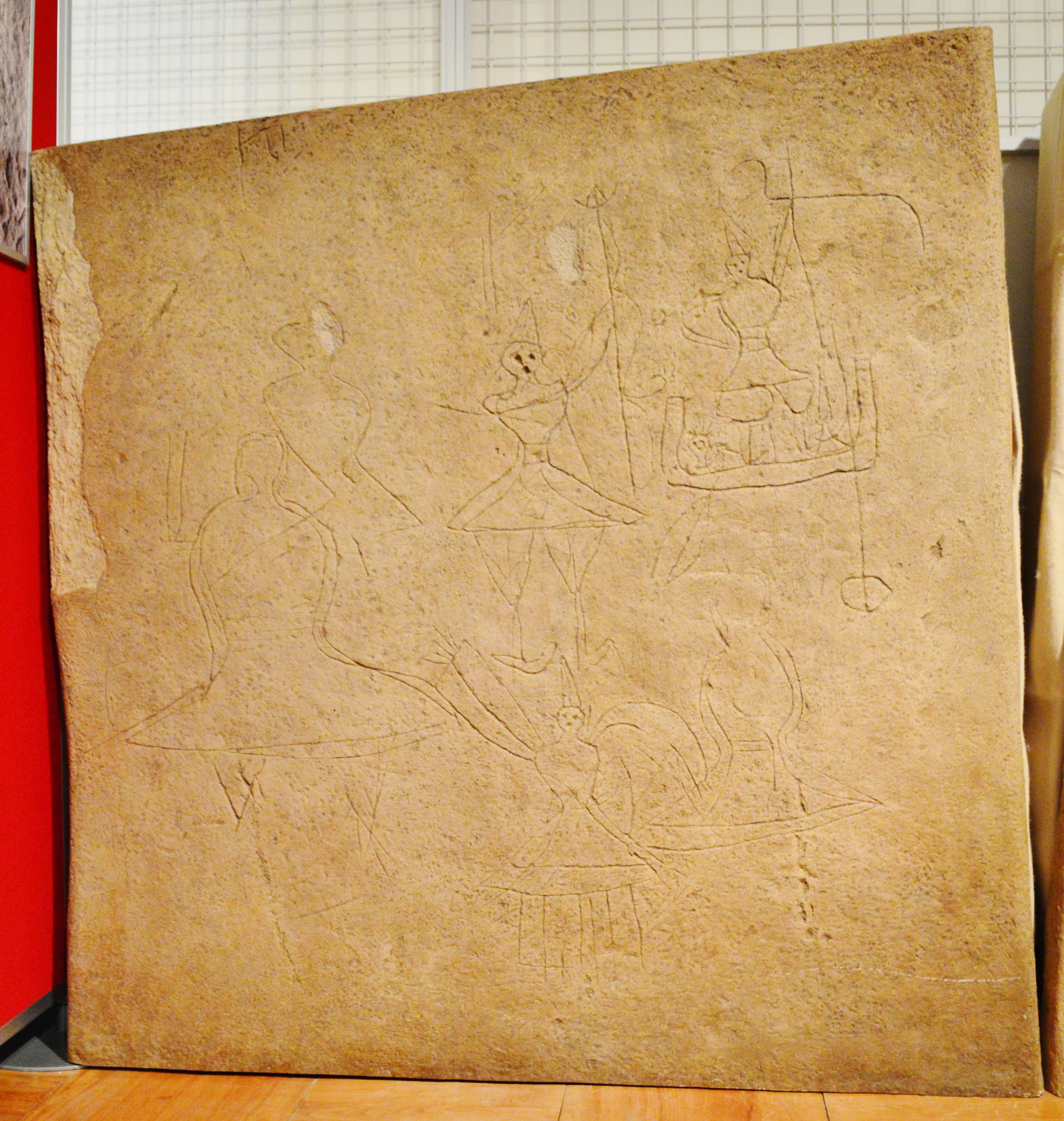
No. 3 branch group No. 5 engraved wall painting

== See also ==
- List of Historic Sites of Japan (Osaka)
- Yoshimi Hundred Caves
