= Kashiwara-minamiguchi Station =

Railway station in Kashiwara, Osaka Prefecture, Japan

Kashiwara-minamiguchi Station 柏原南口駅
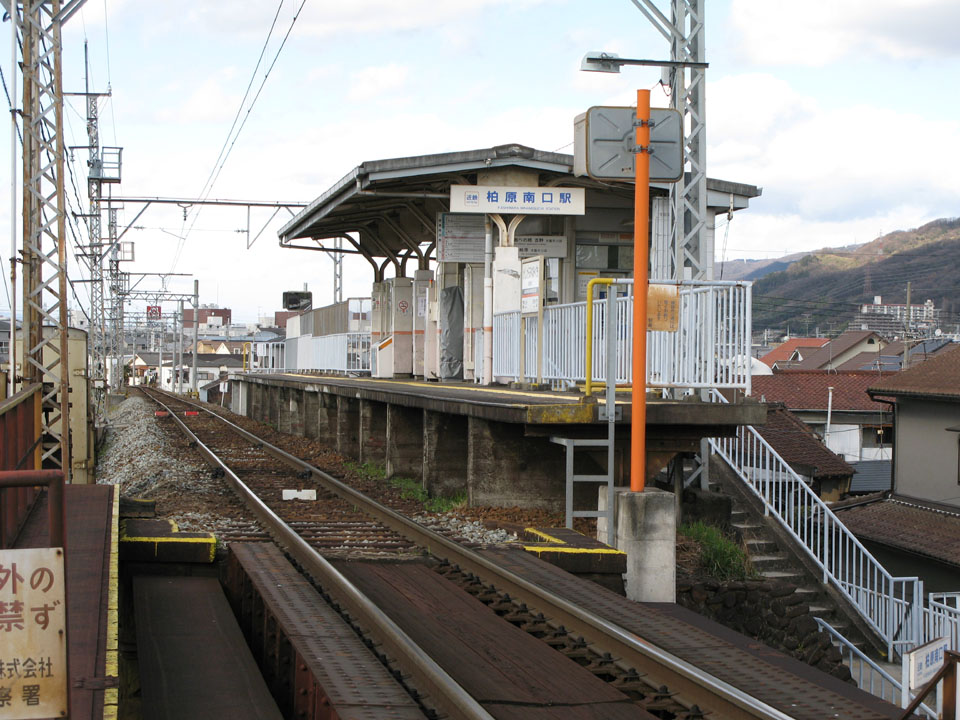

General information
- Location: 2-3, Kamiichi, Kashiwara, Osaka 582-0007 （大阪府柏原市上市2-3） Japan
- Coordinates: 34°34′53″N 135°37′30″E
- Operator: Kintetsu Railway
- Line: Domyoji Line
- Distance: 1.6 km (0.99 mi) from Dōmyōji
- Platforms: 1 side pllatform
- Connections

Other information
- Station code: N16
- Website: Official website

History
- Opened: 1924

Passengers
- 2016: 248 daily
Location
- Location within Osaka Prefecture Location within Japan

Kashiwara-minamiguchi Station (柏原南口駅, Kashiwara-minamiguchi-eki) is a train station in Kashiwara, Osaka Prefecture, Japan.

== Lines ==
- Kintetsu Railway

- Domyoji Line

== Layout ==
| ■ Dōmyōji Line | for Dōmyōji and Kashiwara |

== Stations next to Kashiwara-minamiguchi ==
| « | Service | » |
Kintetsu Domyoji Line
| Dōmyōji | - | Kashiwara |

== Surrounding area ==
- Andō Station
- Yamato River

== See also ==
- List of railway stations in Japan
