= Shiki Station =

Shiki Station is the name of two train stations in Japan:

- Shiki Station (Osaka) (志紀駅)
- Shiki Station (Saitama) (志木駅)
