= Kashiwara Station =

Railway station in Kashiwara, Osaka Prefecture, Japan

Kashiwara Station 柏原駅
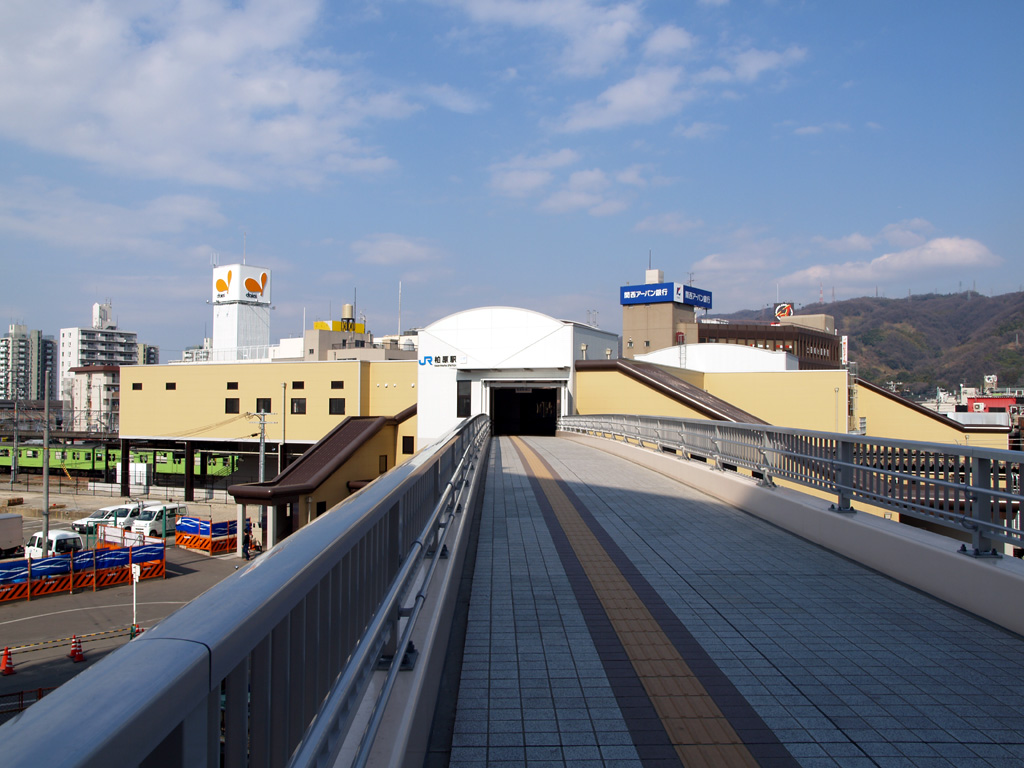
- Kashiwara Station

General information
- Location: 1-32, Kamiichi 1-chōme, Kashiwara, Osaka 582-0007 （大阪府柏原市上市一丁目1-32） Japan
- Coordinates: 34°35′12″N 135°37′24″E
- Operator: West Japan Railway Company; Kintetsu Railway
- Lines: Yamatoji Line; Domyoji Line
- Connections: Bus stop

Other information
- Station code: JR-Q27 (JR West); N17 (Kintetsu)

History
- Opened: 1889 (JR); 1898 (Kintetsu)

Passengers
- 2008: 20,995 daily
Location

Kashiwara Station (柏原駅, Kashiwara-eki) is a railway station in Kashiwara, Osaka Prefecture, Japan. The station is owned by the West Japan Railway Company.

== Lines ==
- West Japan Railway Company

- Yamatoji Line

- Kintetsu Railway

- Domyoji Line (N17)

== Layout ==
There are 2 platforms with 4 tracks and a passing track on the 1st level.

1	■ Kintetsu Domyoji Line	for Dōmyōji
2	■ JR West Yamatoji Line	for Tennōji and JR Namba
passing track for Tennoji	■ JR West Yamatoji Line	no platform
3	■ JR West Yamatoji Line	for Ōji, Nara and Takada returning for Tennōji and JR Namba
4	■ JR West Yamatoji Line	for Ōji, Nara and Takada

== Adjacent stations ==
«	Service	»
West Japan Railway Company (JR West) Kansai Main Line (Yamatoji Line)
Takaida	Local	Shiki
Regional Rapid Service: Does not stop at this station
Terminus	Rapid Service (starting for JR Namba)	Kyūhōji
Rapid Service (others): Does not stop at this station
Yamatoji Rapid Service: Does not stop at this station
Direct Rapid Service: Does not stop at this station
Kintetsu Domyoji Line (N17)
Kashiwara-minamiguchi (N16)	-	Terminus
