= Kawachi-Katakami Station =

Railway station in Kashiwara, Osaka Prefecture, Japan

Coordinates: 34.5743°N 135.6627°E

Kawachi-Katakami Station 河内堅上駅
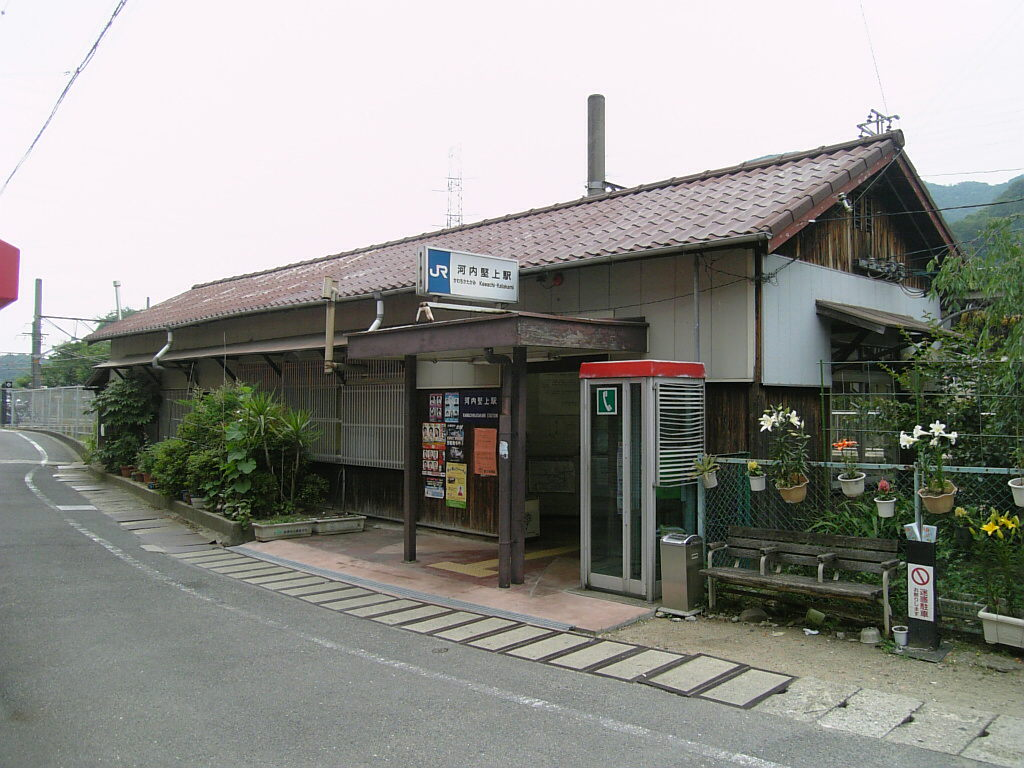
- Station building (June 2007)

General information
- Location: Aotani, Kashiwara, Osaka 582-0014; Kansai region Japan
- Line(s): Kansai Main Line (Yamatoji Line)
- Distance: 154.0 km (95.7 mi) from Nagoya; 33.1 km (20.6 mi) from Kamo
- Platforms: 2
- Tracks: 2
- Train operators: West Japan Railway Company

Other information
- Station code: カチ

History
- Opened: April 19, 1927; 97 years ago

Passengers
- 2021: 287/day

Kawachi-Katakami Station (河内堅上駅, Kawachi-Katakami-eki) is a railway station in Kashiwara, Osaka Prefecture, Japan.

== Lines ==
- West Japan Railway Company
  - Yamatoji Line

== History ==
Station numbering was introduced in March 2018 with Kawachi-Katakami being assigned station number JR-Q29.

== Adjacent stations ==
«	Service	»
Yamatoji Line
Sango	Local	Takaida
Regional Rapid Service: Does not stop at this station
Rapid Service: Does not stop at this station
Yamatoji Rapid Service: Does not stop at this station
Direct Rapid Service: Does not stop at this station
