= Domyoji Line =

Railway line in Osaka, Japan

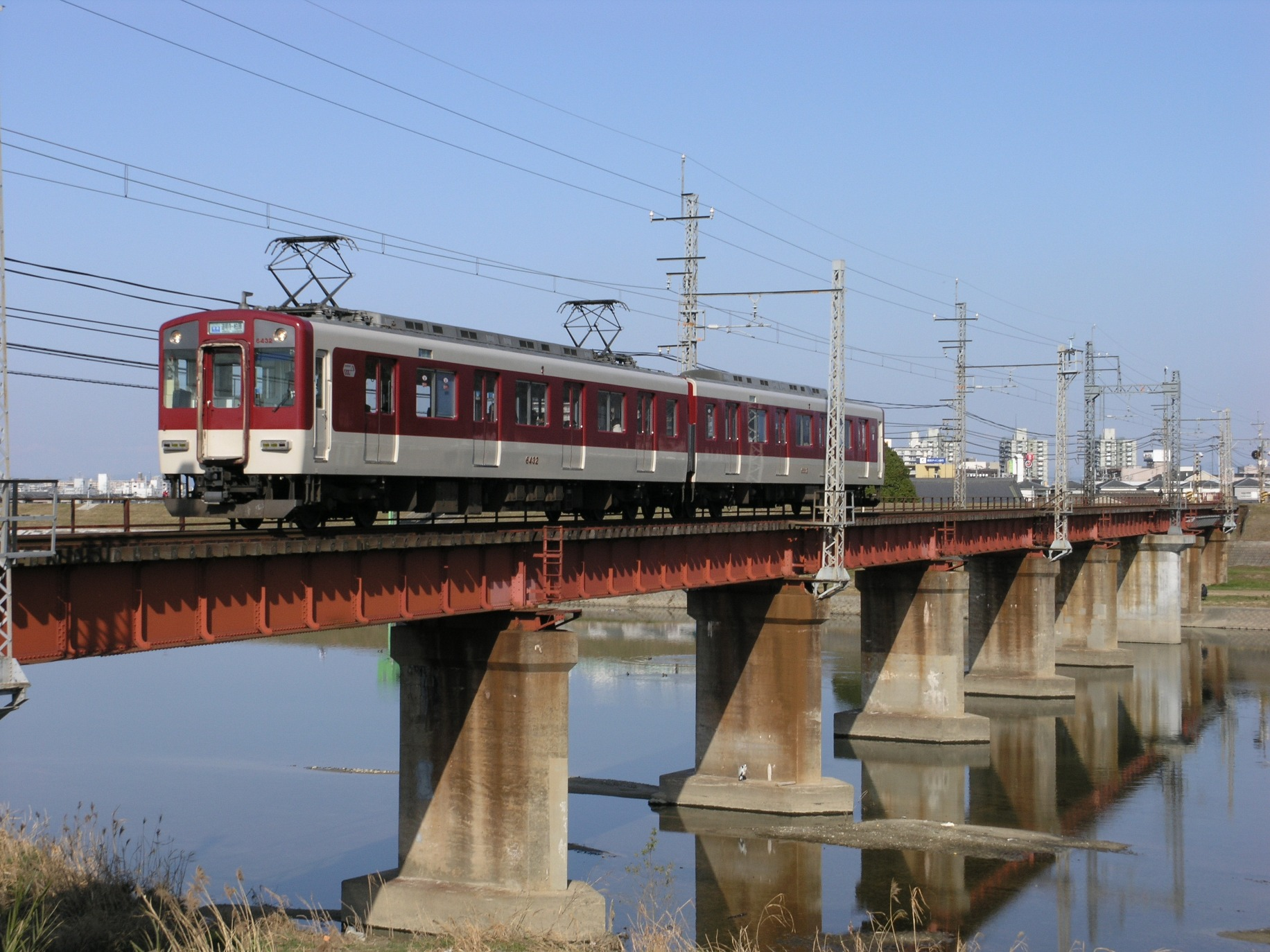
- Kintetsu 6400 series train crossing the Yamato River on the Domyoji Line, January 2010

Overview
- Line number: N
- Locale: Osaka Prefecture
- Termini: Dōmyōji; Kashiwara
- Stations: 3

Service
- Type: Commuter rail
- Services: 1
- Operator(s): Kintetsu Railway
- Depot(s): Furuichi

History
- Opened: 24 March 1898; 127 years ago

Technical
- Line length: 2.2 km (1.4 mi)
- Number of tracks: Single-track
- Track gauge: 1,067 mm (3 ft 6 in)
- Electrification: 1,500 V DC (overhead lines)
- Operating speed: 65 km/h (40 mph)
- Signalling: Automatic closed block
- Train protection system: Kintetsu ATS

The Domyoji Line (道明寺線, Dōmyōji-sen) is a single-tracked, 2.2 km short railway line operated by Kintetsu Railway, connecting Dōmyōji Station in the city of Fujiidera and Kashiwara Station in Kashiwara, both in Osaka Prefecture.

== History ==
The line is the oldest in the Kintetsu railway network. Initially steam-powered, the line was built and opened in 1898 by the Kayō Railway (河陽鉄道, Kayō tetsudō), whose plan was to connect towns of southern Kawachi Province to the then main line of the Osaka Railway (大阪鉄道, Osaka tetsudō), (Note: The Osaka Railway. The first was responsibly constructed Minatomachi (湊町) (present JR Namba) — Nara of present Kansai Main Line, in 1900 merged to the Kansei Railway (関西鉄道, Kansei tetsudō; also read Kwansai or Kansai), nationalized in 1907. The second was the successor of the Kanan Railway, apart from the first.) present-day Kansai Main Line.

In the following year, the whole railway from Kashiwara to Tondabayashi (Note: Presently the entire stretch of Domyoji Line and part of Minami Osaka Line and Nagano Line) was transferred to the Kanan Railway (河南鉄道, Kanan tetsudō), who extended the line to Nagano (present Kawachi-Nagano) in 1902.

With its name changed to the Osaka Railway in 1919, the company built its own railway directly to Osaka's downtown, diverting at Dōmyōji. The new line opened in 1923 to Osaka Tennōji (大阪天王寺) (present Ōsaka Abenobashi) with 1,500 V DC electrified, the first in Japan. Then the railway line between Dōmyōji and Kashiwara became a short branch line of the network.

In 1943, the predecessor of Kintetsu, the Kansai Express Railway (関西急行鉄道, Kansai kyūkō tetsudō) merged the company. In 1944 it renamed itself Kintetsu.

== Operation ==
All trains are operated as locals between Dōmyōji and Kashiwara. One set of two-car EMU serves the line all day.

== Stations ==
All stations are in Osaka Prefecture.

No.	Stations	Japanese	Distance (km)	Transfers	Location
N15	Dōmyōji	道明寺	0.0	F Minami Osaka Line (F15)	Fujiidera
N16	Kashiwara-minamiguchi	柏原南口	1.6	D Osaka Line (Ando) (D17)	Kashiwara
N17	Kashiwara	柏原	2.2	Q Yamatoji Line (V Kansai Line) (JR-Q27); D Osaka Line (Katashimo) (D16)	Kashiwara
