= Kansai Women's College =

College in Japan

Coordinates: 34°33′34″N 135°38′11″E

- 関西女子短期大学
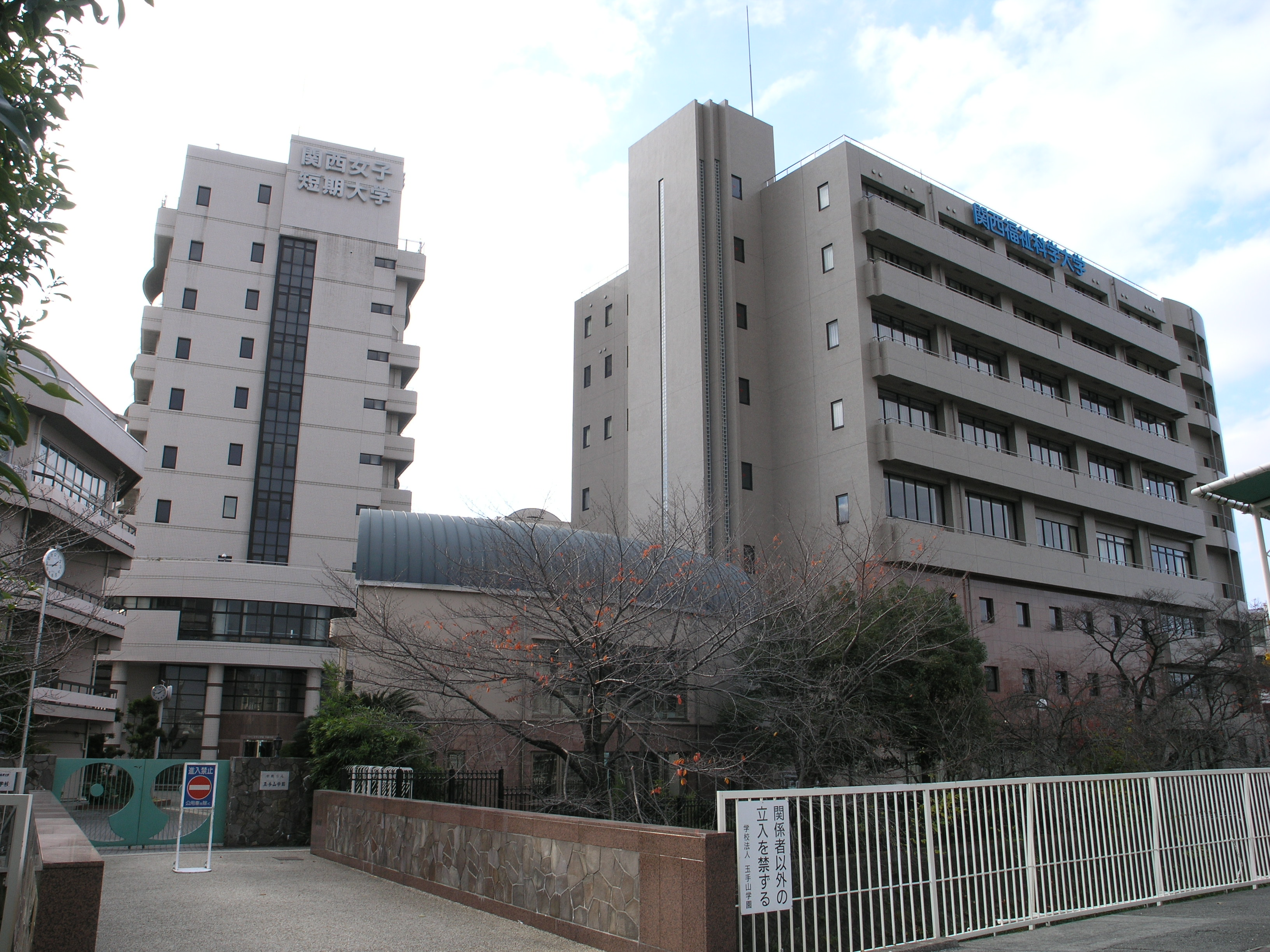
- Former name: Tamateyama Women's College
- Type: Private women's junior college
- Established: 1965
- Location: Kashiwara, Osaka, Japan

Kansai Women's College (関西女子短期大学, Kansai Joshi Tanki Daigaku) is a private women's junior college in Kashiwara, Osaka, Japan. It was established in 1965 as Tamateyama Women's College (玉手山女子短期大学), and adopted its present name the following year.
