= Dōmyōji Station =

Railway station in Fujiidera, Osaka Prefecture, Japan

Dōmyōji Station 道明寺駅
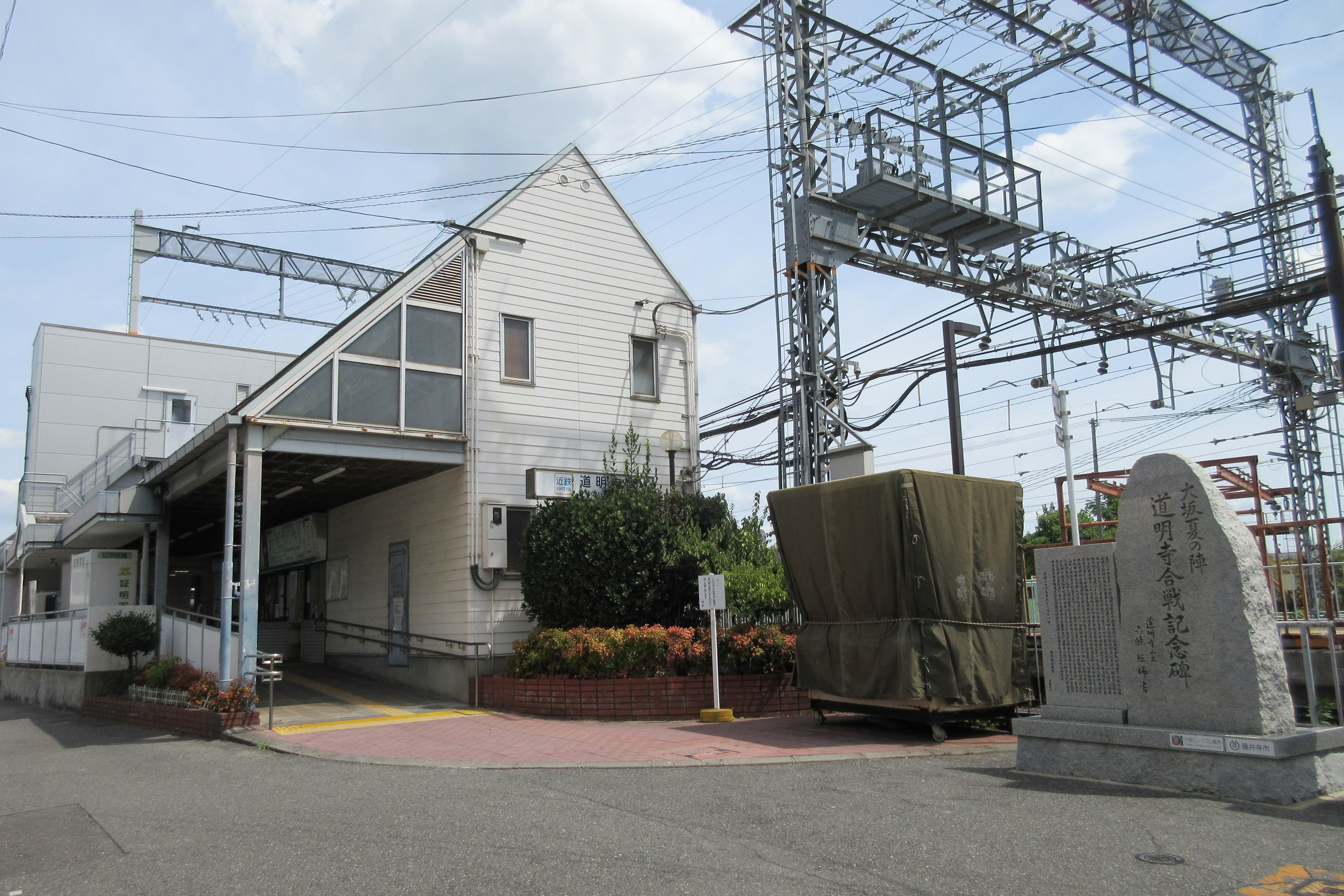
- Dōmyōji Station in August 2018

General information
- Location: 1-55, Dōmyōji 3-chōme, Fujiidera-shi, Osaka-fu 583-0012; Japan
- Coordinates: 34°34′05″N 135°37′12″E
- Operator: Kintetsu Railway
- Lines: Minami Osaka Line; Domyoji Line
- Distance: 12.6 km (7.8 mi) from Ōsaka Abenobashi
- Platforms: 1 island + 1 side platform

Other information
- Station code: F15 (Minami Osaka Line); N15 (Dōmyōji Line)
- Website: Official website

History
- Opened: March 24, 1898; 128 years ago

Passengers
- FY2019: 6643 daily

Services
Preceding station	Kintetsu Railway	Following station
Hajinosato towards Ōsaka Abenobashi	Minami Osaka Line Local Semi-Express	Furuichi towards Kashiharajingū-mae
Terminus	Domyoji Line	Kashiwara-minamiguchi towards Kashiwara
Location
- Location within Osaka Prefecture Location within Japan

Dōmyōji Station (道明寺駅, Dōmyōji-eki) is a junction passenger railway station in located in the city of Fujiidera, Osaka Prefecture, Japan, operated by the private railway operator Kintetsu Railway.

== Lines ==
Dōmyōji Station is served by the Minami Osaka Line, and is located 16.3 rail kilometers from the starting point of the line at Ōsaka Abenobashi Station. It is also the terminus of the 2.2 kilometer Dōmyōji Line to Kashiwara Station.

== Station layout ==
This station consists of an island platform and a side platform on the ground, serving three tracks, connected by an underground passage. Entrances/exits are located on the south side of the side platform serving Track 3.

=== Platforms ===
1	■ Domyoji Line	for Kashiwara
2	■ Minami-Osaka Line	for Furuichi, Kashiharajingū-mae, Yoshino and Kawachinagano
3	■ Minami-Osaka Line	for Ōsaka Abenobashi

== History ==
Dōmyōji Station opened on March 24, 1898.

== Passenger statistics ==
In fiscal 2018, the station was used by an average of 6,643 passengers daily.

== Surrounding area ==
- Dōmyō-ji
- Dōmyōji Tenman-gu

== See also ==
- List of railway stations in Japan
