= Osaka Kyoiku University =

University in Kashiwara, Osaka, Japan

Coordinates: 34°33′06″N 135°39′00″E

- 大阪教育大学
- Other names: Daikyōdai (大教大), OKU
- Type: Public (National)
- Established: 31 May, 1949 ( at reformation of educational system) founded in May, 1874 (as a teacher training school)
- President: Sumio Kuribatashi
- Faculty: 256 (May 1, 2021); 267 - Attached School Teachers (May 1, 2021)
- Administrative staff: 177 (May 1, 2021)
- Students: 4,350 (May 1, 2021)
- Undergraduates: 2,467 - Course for School Teachers (May 1, 2021); 1,488 - Department of Educational Collaboration (May 1, 2021)
- Postgraduates: 367 (May 1, 2021)
- Other students: 28 - Postgraduate Diploma Course (May 1, 2021)
- Location: Kashiwara, Osaka Prefecture, Japan
- Website: osaka-kyoiku.ac.jp/en/

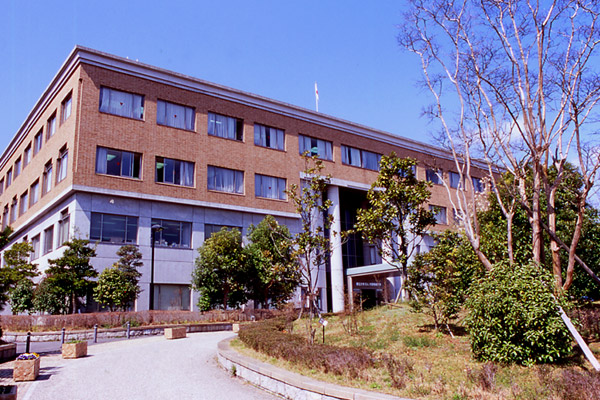
Kashiwara campus.

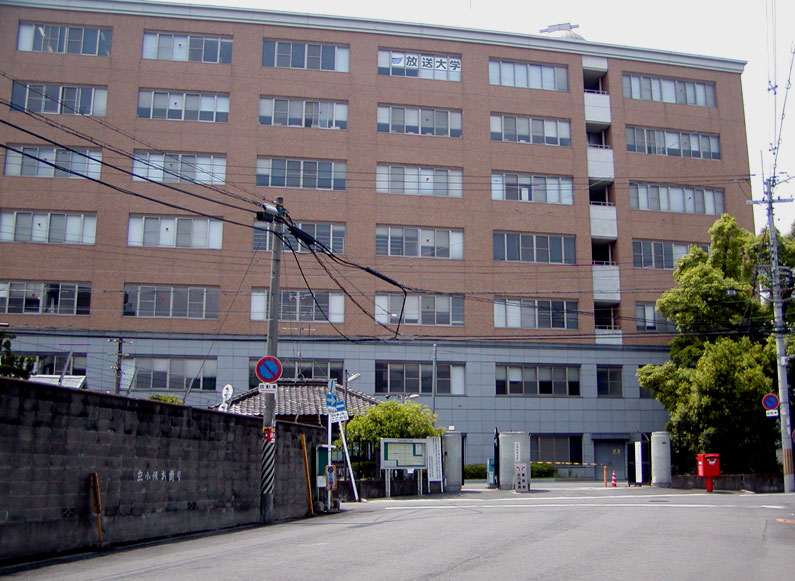
Tennōji campus.

Osaka Kyoiku University (大阪教育大学, Ōsaka Kyōiku Daigaku) is a national university with headquarters in the city of Kashiwara, Osaka Prefecture, Japan and a branch campus in Tennōji-ku in the prefectural capital city of Osaka. It was established in 1949 by the merger of two predecessor institutions. Its short name is Daikyōdai. The university specializes in educating teachers. Unique among the national universities is its five-year program of nighttime study.

== Sources ==
This article is based on the article 大阪教育大学 in the Japanese Wikipedia, retrieved on November 2, 2007.
