= Shiki Station (Osaka) =

Railway station in Yao, Osaka Prefecture, Japan

Shiki Station 志紀駅
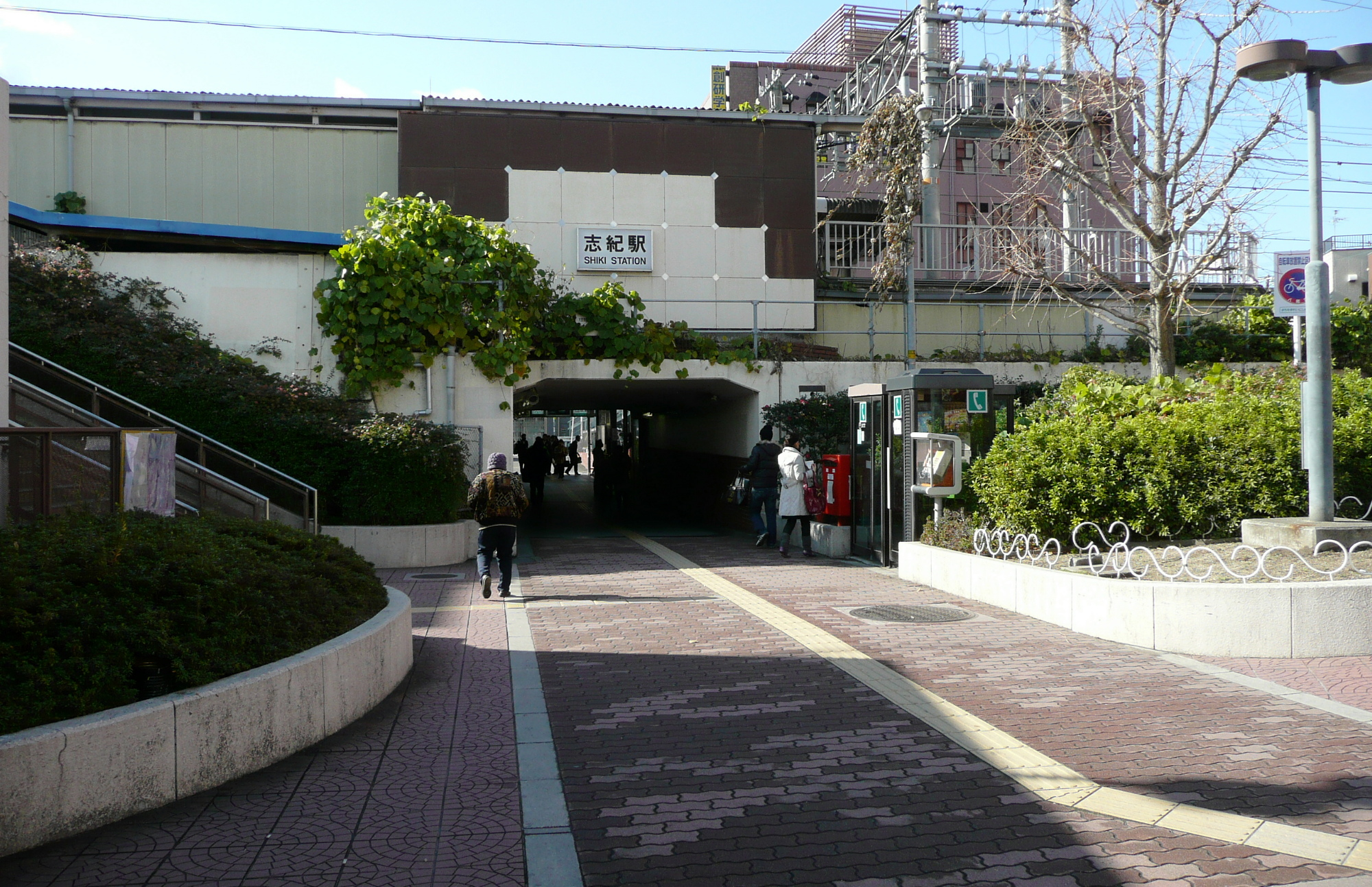
- Shiki Station north entrance, June 2010

General information
- Location: 3-chome Shiki-cho, Yao-shi, Osaka-fu 581-0031; Japan
- Coordinates: 34°36′2.1″N 135°36′56.2″E
- System: JR-West commuter rail station
- Owner: West Japan Railway Company
- Operator: West Japan Railway Company
- Line: Q Kansai Main Line (Yamatoji Line)
- Distance: 160.5 km (99.7 miles) from Nagoya; 39.6 km (24.6 miles) from Kamo
- Platforms: 2 side platforms
- Tracks: 2
- Train operators: West Japan Railway Company

Construction
- Structure type: Ground level

Other information
- Status: Unstaffed
- Station code: JR-Q26
- Website: Official website

History
- Opened: 1 April 1909

Passengers
- FY2019: 10,525 daily
Services
Preceding station	JR West	Following station
Yao towards JR Namba	Yamatoji Line Local	Kashiwara towards Kamo
Location
- Location within Osaka Prefecture Location within Japan

Shiki Station (志紀駅, Shiki-eki) is a passenger railway station in located in the city of Yao, Osaka Prefecture, Japan, operated by West Japan Railway Company (JR West).

== Lines ==
Shiki Station is served by the Kansai Main Line (Yamatoji Line), and is located 160.5 kilometers from the terminus of the line at Nagoya Station and 39.6 kilometers from Kamo.

== Station layout ==
The station consists of two opposed side platforms connected by a footbridge. The station is staffed.

=== Platforms ===
1	■ Q Yamatoji Line	for Ōji, Nara and Takada
2	■ Q Yamatoji Line	for Tennōji, Namba and Osaka

== History ==
Shiki Station opened on 1 April 1909. With the privatization of the Japan National Railways (JNR) on 1 April 1987, the station came under the aegis of the West Japan Railway Company.

Station numbering was introduced in March 2018 with Shiki being assigned station number JR-Q26.

== Passenger statistics ==
In fiscal 2019, the station was used by an average of 10,525 passengers daily (boarding passengers only).

== Surrounding Area ==
- Yuge Jinja
- Nagase River
- Yao City Hall Shiki Branch Office
- Shiki Community Center
- Yao City Shiki Library

== See also ==
- List of railway stations in Japan
