= Kashiwara =

City in Kansai, Japan

Kashiwara 柏原市
- City
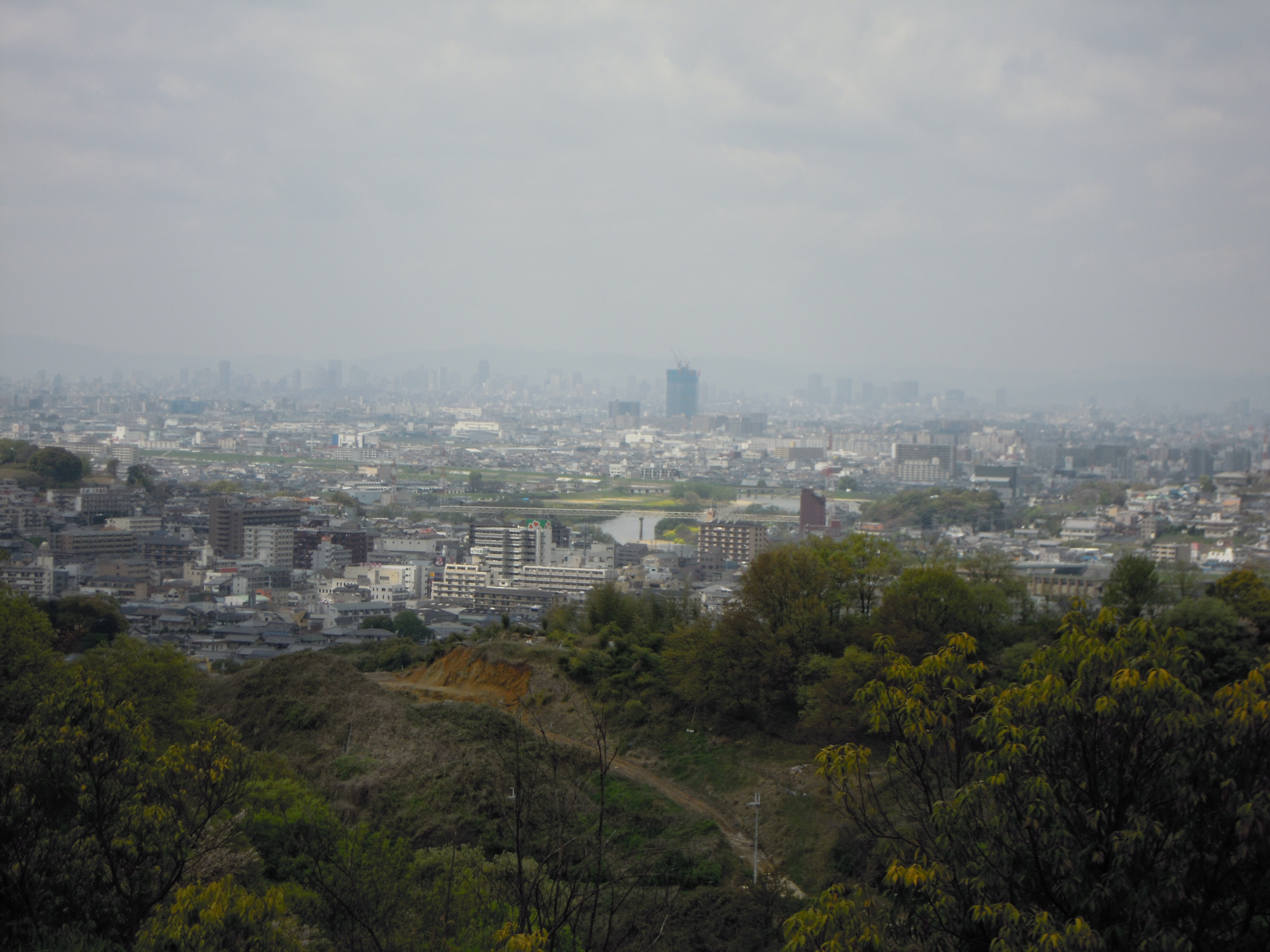
- View of Kashiwara

- Flag Emblem

- Location of Kashiwara in Osaka Prefecture

- Location in Japan
- Coordinates: 34°35′N 135°38′E
- Country: Japan
- Region: Kansai
- Prefecture: Osaka

Area
  - Total: 25.33 km^{2} (9.78 sq mi)

Population (January 31, 2021)
  - Total: 67,698
  - Density: 2,673/km^{2} (6,922/sq mi)
- Time zone: UTC+09:00 (JST)
- City hall address: 1-55 Andocho, Kashiwara-shi, Osaka- fu 582-8555
- Website: Official website
- Symbols
- Flower: Rhododendron
- Tree: Platycladus

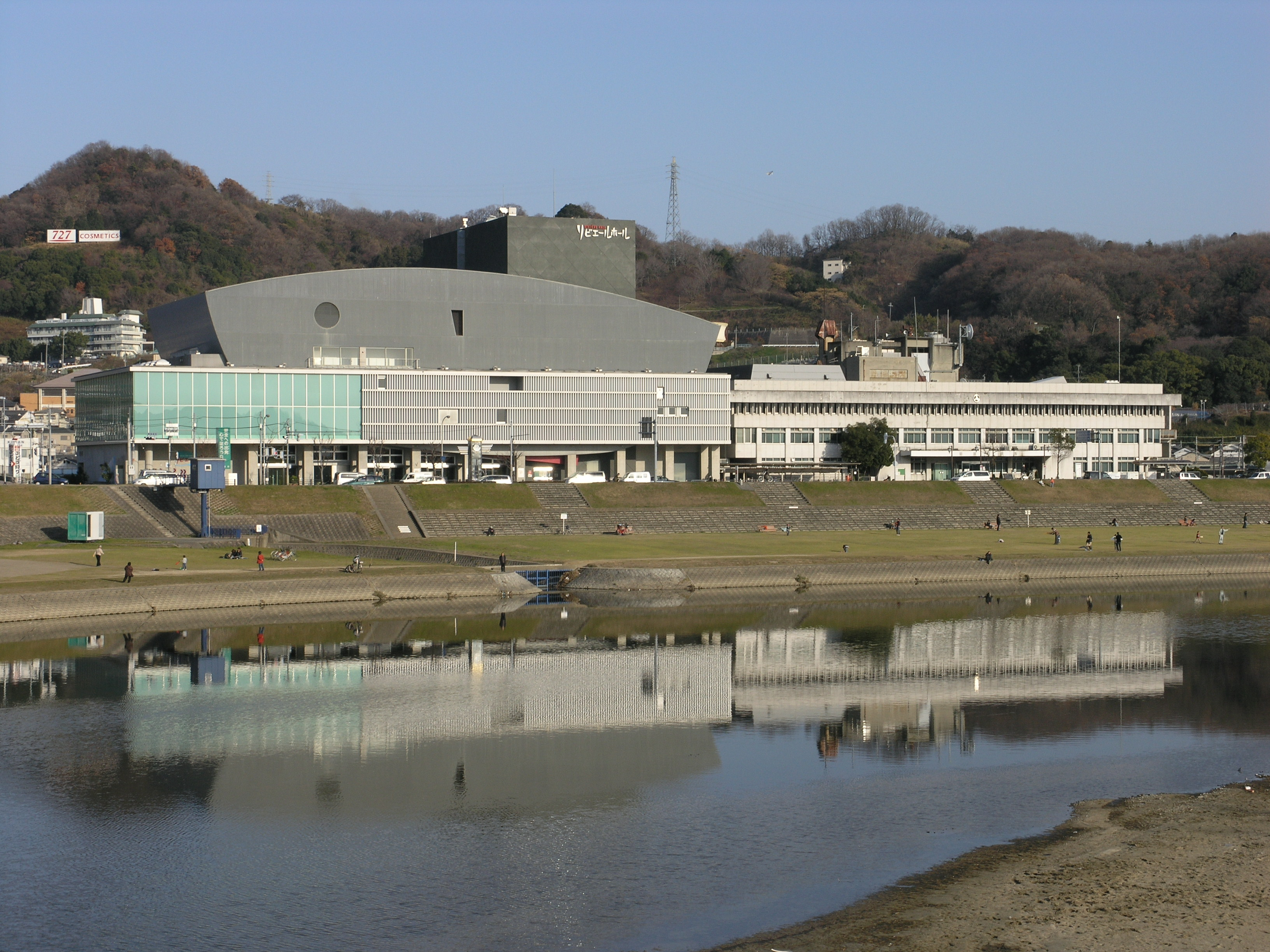
Kashiwara City Hall

Kashiwara (柏原市, Kashiwara-shi) is a city located in Osaka Prefecture, Japan. As of 31 January 2022, the city had an estimated population of 67,698 in 32007 households and a population density of 2,700 inhabitants per square kilometre (7,000/sq mi). The total area of the city is 25.33 square kilometres (9.78 sq mi).

== Geography ==
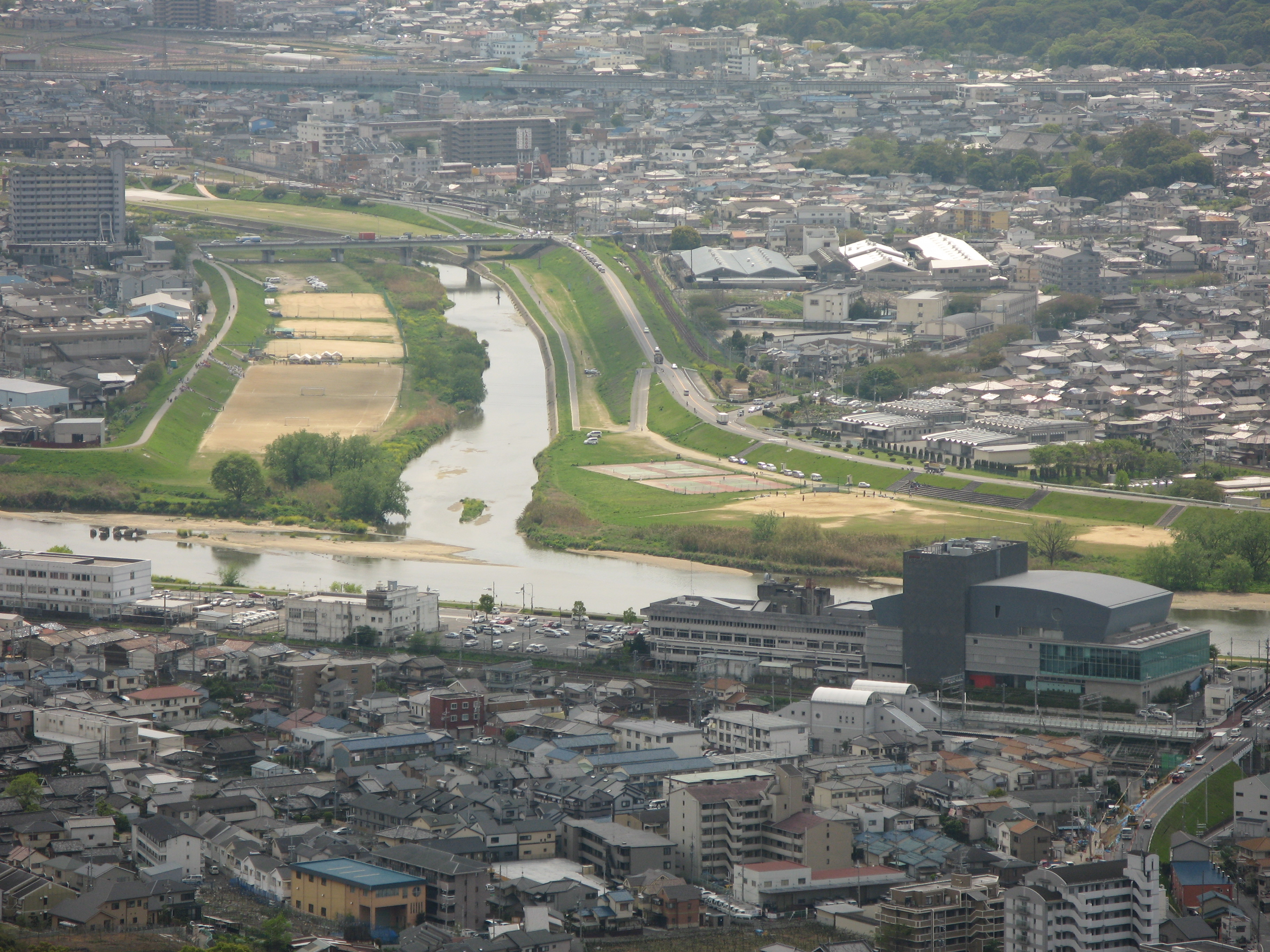
Yamato River at Kashiwara and Fujiidera

Kashiwara is located about 20 kilometres (12 mi) from central Osaka on the Yamato River, which separates it from neighboring Fujiidera. The northwestern part of the city is relatively flat, but the terrain rises to the east where the Ikoma Mountains and Mount Kongō form the border with Nara Prefecture.

=== Neighboring municipalities ===
Nara Prefecture

- Kashiba
- Ōji
- Sangō

Osaka Prefecture

- Fujiidera
- Habikino
- Yao

== Climate ==
Kashiwara has a humid subtropical climate (Köppen Cfa) characterized by warm summers and cool winters with light to no snowfall. The average annual temperature in Kashiwara is 14.9 °C (58.8 °F). The average annual rainfall is 1,636 mm (64.4 in) with September as the wettest month. The temperatures are highest on average in August, at around 27.0 °C (80.6 °F), and lowest in January, at around 3.5 °C (38.3 °F).

== Demographics ==
Per Japanese census data, the population of Kashiwara has increased steadily until around the year 2000, and has since started to decline.

Historical population
| Year | Pop. | ±% |
|---|---|---|
| 1920 | 13,560 | — |
| 1930 | 17,478 | +28.9% |
| 1940 | 24,226 | +38.6% |
| 1950 | 31,487 | +30.0% |
| 1960 | 35,645 | +13.2% |
| 1970 | 53,104 | +49.0% |
| 1980 | 69,836 | +31.5% |
| 1990 | 76,819 | +10.0% |
| 2000 | 79,227 | +3.1% |
| 2010 | 74,840 | −5.5% |

== History ==
The area of the modern city of Kashiwara was within ancient Kawachi Province. Remains dating back to the Japanese Paleolithic have been found, indicating many thousands of years of continuous settlement. During the Kofun period, many burial mounds were built in Kashihara due to its location on the Yamato River connecting the Yamato Basin with the coast. During the Nara period, the Kawachi kokubunji was built. During the Edo Period, the area was mostly tenryō territory directly under control of the Tokugawa shogunate due to its strategic location. The village of Kashihara was established within Shiki District with the creation of the modern municipalities system on April 1, 1889. On April 1, 1896, the area became part of Minamikawachi District, Osaka. Kashiwara was promoted to town status on January 1, 1915. Kashiwara Town absorbed Katashimo Town and Katakami Village in 1939 and its district was changed to Nakakawachi District. The large area of Kokubu Town merged with Kashiwara Town in 1956. In 1958, Kashiwara was elevated to city status.

== Government ==
Kashiwara has a mayor-council form of government with a directly elected mayor and a unicameral city council of 16 members. Kashiwara contributes one member to the Osaka Prefectural Assembly. In terms of national politics, the city is part of Osaka 14th district of the lower house of the Diet of Japan.

== Economy ==
Kashiwara was traditionally known for its dyeing industry, notably for use in yukata robes, most much of this industry has been lost to overseas competition. In terms of agriculture, the area is note for production of grapes. The modern economy is centered on light manufacturing and the city is also increasingly becoming a commuter town for the Osaka metropolis.

== Education ==
Kashiwara has ten public elementary schools and seven public middle schools operated by the city government. The city does not have a public high school, but there are two private high schools. Universities include the Osaka Kyoiku University, Kansai University of Welfare Sciences, and Kansai Women's College.

== Transportation ==
=== Railway ===
JR West

- Kansai Main Line (Yamatoji Line)
  - Kashiwara - Takaida - Kawachi-Katakami

Kintetsu Railway

- Kintetsu Osaka Line
  - Hozenji - Katashimo - Ando - Kawachi-Kokubu
- Kintetsu Domyoji Line
  - Kashiwara - Kashiwara-minamiguchi

=== Highway ===
- Nishi-Meihan Expressway
- National Route 25
- National Route 165
- National Route 170

== Sister cities ==
- Xinxiang, Henan, China
- Grosseto and Province of Grosseto, Italy

== Local attractions ==
- Takaida Cave Tombs, National Historic Site
- Projection mapping inside Kamenose Tunnel "Japan Heritage 'Tatsuta Kodo and Kamenose' Journey of Light"

== Notable people from Kashiwara ==
- Masahiro Doi, baseball player
- Tomoyuki Tanaka, film producer
