= Takaida Station (Osaka) =

Railway station in Kashiwara, Osaka Prefecture, Japan

Coordinates: 34°34′17″N 135°38′19″E

Takaida Station 高井田駅
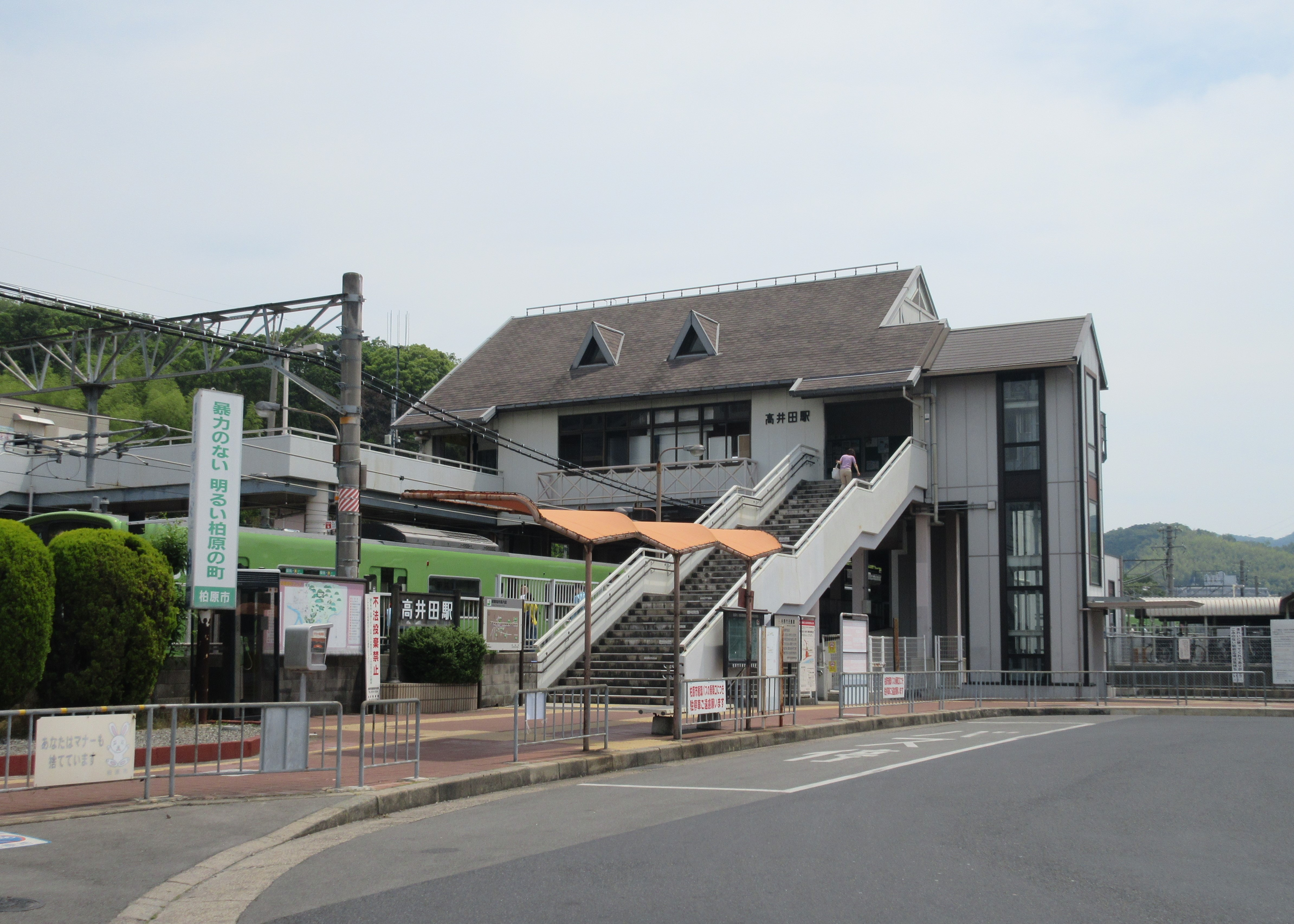
- Takaida Station building, January 2008

General information
- Location: Kashiwara, Osaka; Japan
- Operator: West Japan Railway Company
- Line: Yamatoji Line

Construction
- Structure type: Ground level

Other information
- Station code: JR-Q28

Services
Preceding station	JR West	Following station
Kashiwara towards JR Namba	Yamatoji Line Local	Kawachi-Katakami towards Kamo
Location

Takaida Station (高井田駅, Takaida-eki) is a railway station in Kashiwara, Osaka Prefecture, Japan.

== Lines ==
- West Japan Railway Company
  - Yamatoji Line

== History ==
Takaida Station opened on 29 August 1985.

Station numbering was introduced in March 2018 with Takaida being assigned station number JR-Q28.
