= Yamato River =

River in Kansai, Japan

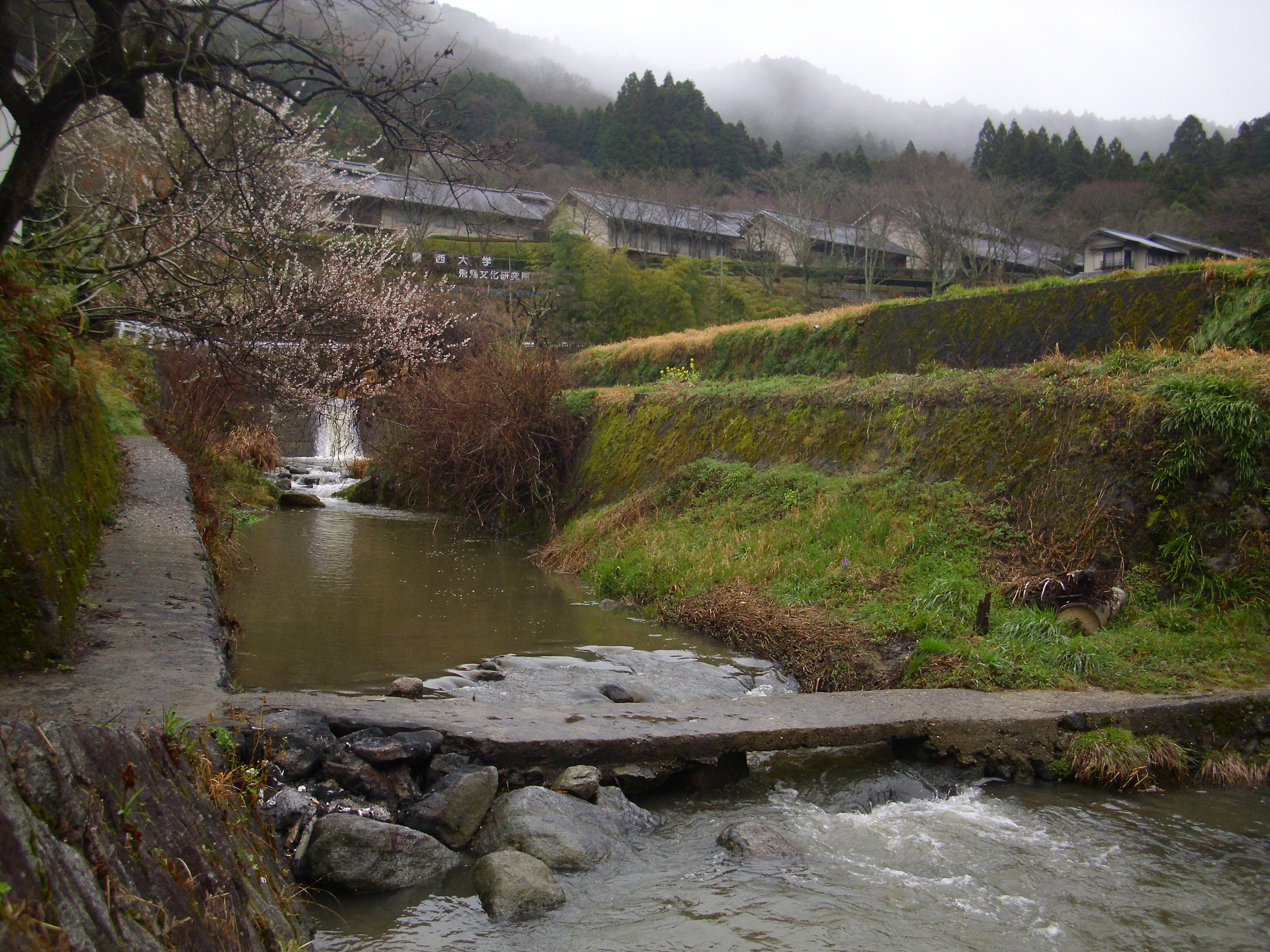

- Location within Japan
- Native name: 大和川 (Japanese)

Location
- Country: Japan
- Region: Kansai region

Physical characteristics
- Source
  - location: Kaikira-yama, Nara Prefecture
  - elevation: 822 m (2,697 ft)
- Mouth: Osaka Bay
  - coordinates: 34°36′30″N 135°26′28″E
- Length: 68 km (42 mi)

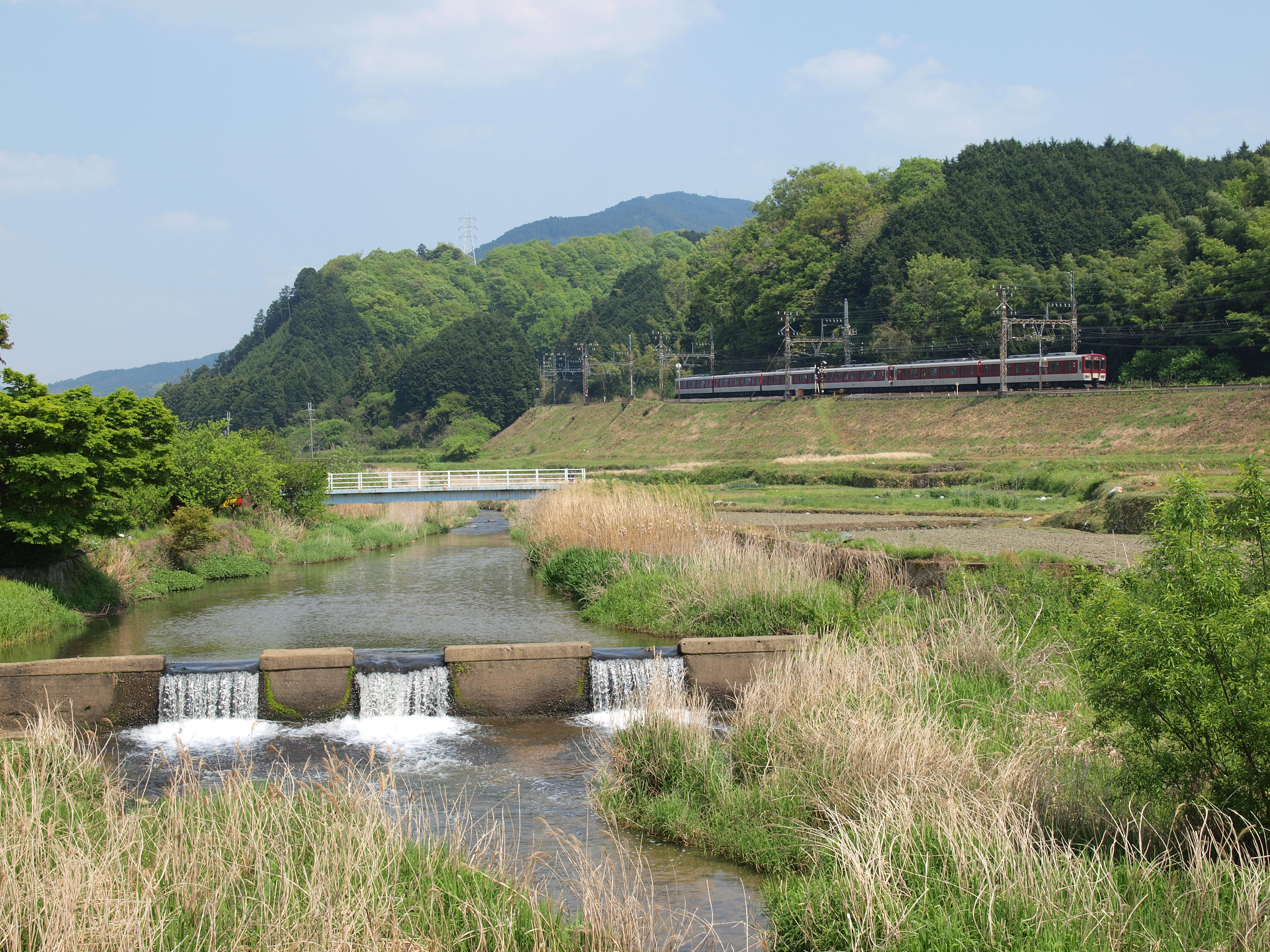
River in Sakurai, Nara Prefecture.

The Yamato River (大和川, Yamato-gawa) is a river that flows through Nara Prefecture and Osaka Prefecture, Japan. It is designated Class A by the Ministry of Land, Infrastructure, Transport and Tourism (MLIT).

The river flows via towns:

- Nara Prefecture
  - Yamatokōriyama
- Osaka Prefecture
  - Kashiwara
  - Fujiidera - confluence with Ishikawa River

Since 1704, the river was reconfigured, originally its flow was north from the Ishikawa River confluence point, where it joined the Shirinashi River and Kizu River.

At the river mouth is a densely populated area and the river forms a natural border between Osaka and Sakai.

== See also ==
- List of rivers of Japan
