= Kintetsu Yao Station =

Railway station in Yao, Osaka Prefecture, Japan

Kintetsu Yao Station 近鉄八尾駅
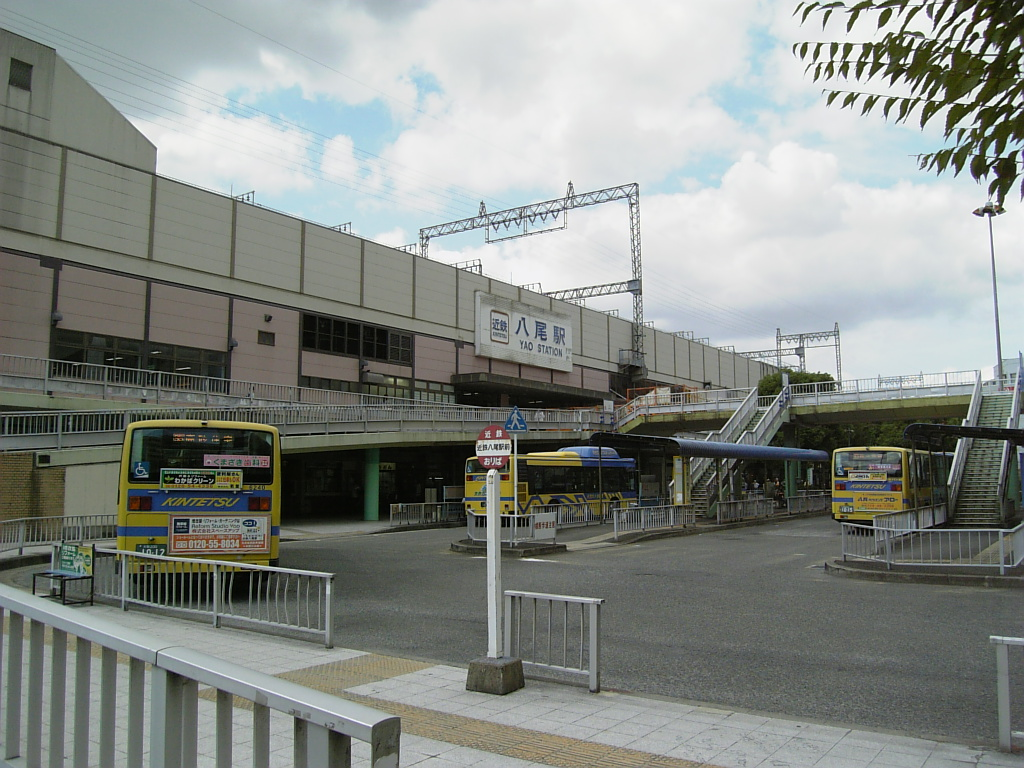
- Kintetsu Yao Station, September 2006

General information
- Location: 2-153-2, Kita-Hommachi, Yao-shi, Osaka-fu 581-0802; Japan
- Coordinates: 34°37′46.93″N 135°36′13.94″E
- Operator: Kintetsu Railway
- Line: Osaka Line
- Distance: 9.6 km from Ōsaka Uehommachi
- Platforms: 2 side platforms
- Connections: Bus terminal

Other information
- Station code: D11
- Website: Official website

History
- Opened: October 31, 1924
- Former names: Daiki Yao; Kankyu Yao Station; Kinki Nippon Yao (until 1970)

Passengers
- FY2018: 37,867 daily
Location
- Location within Osaka Prefecture Location within Japan

Kintetsu Yao Station (近鉄八尾駅, Kintetsu Yao-eki) is a passenger railway station in located in the city of Yao, Osaka Prefecture, Japan, operated by the private railway operator Kintetsu Railway.

== Lines ==
Kintetsu Yao Station is served by the Osaka Line, and is located 9.6 rail kilometers from the starting point of the line at Ōsaka Uehommachi Station.

== Station layout ==
The station consists of two elevated opposed side platforms with the station building underneath.

=== Platforms ===
| 1 | ■ Osaka Line | for Kawachi-Kokubu, Yamato-Yagi and Nabari |
| 2 | ■ Osaka Line | for Fuse and Osaka Uehommachi |

== Adjacent stations ==
| « | Service | » |
Osaka Line
| Kyūhōjiguchi | Local | Kawachi-Yamamoto |
| Fuse | Semi-Express; Suburban Semi-Express | Kawachi-Yamamoto |
Express: Does not stop at this station
Rapid Express: Does not stop at this station

== History ==
Kintetsu Yao Station opened on October 31, 1924 as Yao Station (八尾駅). In August 1928 it was renamed Daiki Yao Station (大軌八尾駅), followed by Kankyu Yao Station (関急八尾駅) on March 13, 1941, Kinki Nihon Yao Station (近畿日本八尾駅) on June 1, 1944, and finally to its present name on March 1, 1970.

== Passenger statistics ==
In fiscal 2018, the station was used by an average of 37,867 passengers daily.

== Surrounding area ==
- Yao City Hall
- Seibu Department Store Yao
- Prism Hall
- Ario Yao (Ito Yokado)
- Shotengai
  - Pento Mall
  - Kintetsu Yao-kita Shotengai
  - Shin-Sakae Shotengai
  - Family Road
  - Kita-Hommachi Chuo-dori
  - Yao Omotedori
- Osaka University of Economics and Law Yao Campus (official site)
- Jōkō-ji (Yao) Buddhist temple

== Buses ==
Kintetsu Bus Co., Ltd.
- Bus stop 1 Yao-Kyoto Route
  - Expressway buses for Kyoto Station Hachijoguchi (New Miyako Hotel)
- Bus stop 3 Takasago Route
  - Route 94 for Takasago Housing via Ario Yao, Midorigaoka and Yamamoto-ekimae
  - Route 95 for Takasago Housing via Midorigaoka and Yamamoto-ekimae
- Bus stop 4 Yao Route
  - Route 70 for Fujiidera via JR Yao-ekimae, Taishido and Yaominami
  - Route 73 for Yaominami via JR Yao-ekimae and Taishido
- Bus Stop 6 Kayashima Route for Kayafuri and Wakae-Iwata
  - Route 36 for JR Suminodo via Aramoto
  - Route 38 for Aramoto
  - Route 39 for Kayashima via JR Suminodo
  - Route 43 for JR Suminodo via Ario Yao and Aramoto
  - Route 44 for Kayashima via Ario Yao and JR Suminodo
- Bus stop 7 Shiki Route
  - Route 26 for Shiki Depot via Yao Hokenjo-mae (Health Center), Shonaicho, Yaogi and Tainaka

Osaka Bus Co., Ltd.
- Bus stop 7 Fuse-Yao Route
  - For Fuse Station via Kanaoka, Ohasu and JR Nagase

== See also ==
- List of railway stations in Japan
