= Kyūhōjiguchi Station =

Railway station in Yao, Osaka Prefecture, Japan

Kyūhōjiguchi Station 久宝寺口駅
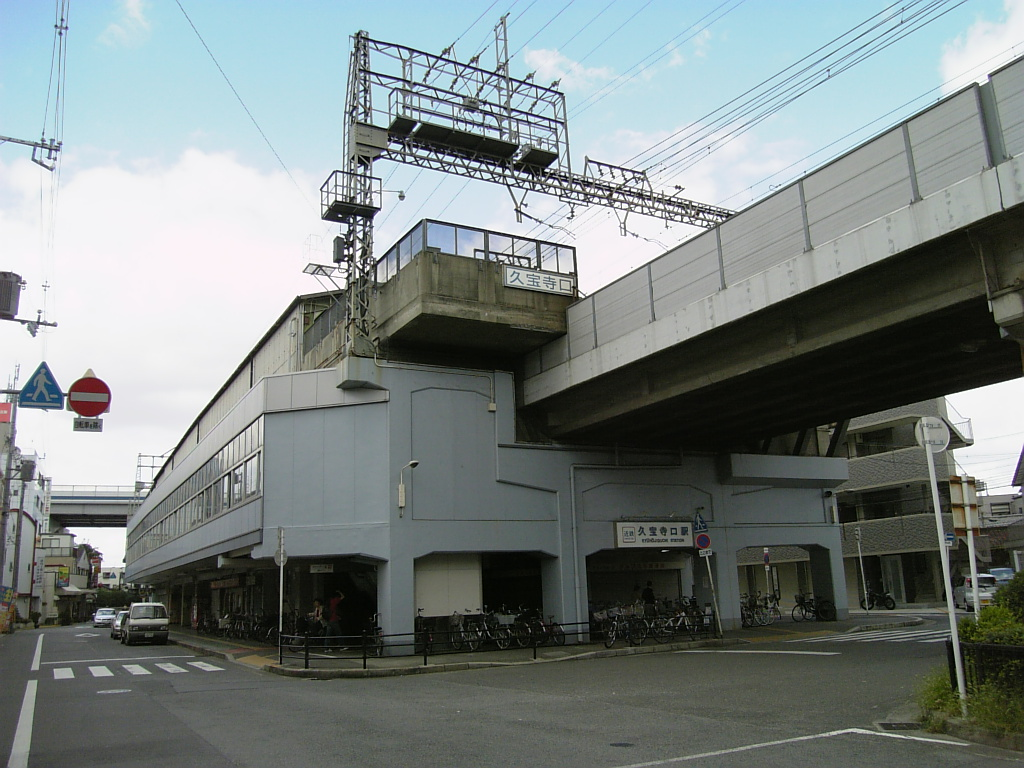
- Kyūhōjiguchi Station, September 2006

General information
- Location: 3-1-7, Sadōchō, Yao-shi, Osaka-fu 581-0816; Japan
- Coordinates: 34°38′5.27″N 135°35′25.23″E
- Operator: Kintetsu Railway
- Line: Osaka Line
- Distance: 8.3 km from Ōsaka Uehommachi
- Platforms: 2 side platforms
- Connections

Other information
- Station code: D10
- Website: Official website

History
- Opened: September 30, 1925

Passengers
- FY2018: 5,445 daily
Location
- Location within Osaka Prefecture Location within Japan

Kyūhōjiguchi Station (久宝寺口駅, Kyūhōjiguchi-eki) is a passenger railway station in located in the city of Yao, Osaka Prefecture, Japan, operated by the private railway operator Kintetsu Railway.

== Lines ==
Kyūhōjiguchi Station is served by the Osaka Line, and is located 8.3 rail kilometers from the starting point of the line at Ōsaka Uehommachi Station.

== Station layout ==
The station consists of two elevated opposed side platforms with the station building underneath.

=== Platforms ===
1	■ Osaka Line	for Kawachi-Kokubu and Yamato-Yagi
2	■ Osaka Line	for Fuse and Osaka Uehommachi

== Adjacent stations ==
«	Service	»
Osaka Line
Mito	Local	Kintetsu Yao
Suburban Semi-Express: Does not stop at this station
Semi-Express: Does not stop at this station
Express: Does not stop at this station
Rapid Express: Does not stop at this station

== History ==
Kyūhōjiguchi Station opened on September 30, 1925.

== Passenger statistics ==
In fiscal 2018, the station was used by an average of 5,445 passengers daily.

== Surrounding area ==
- Kinki Expressway
- Nagase River

== See also ==
- List of railway stations in Japan
