= Hōzenji Station =

Railway station in Kashiwara, Osaka Prefecture, Japan

Hōzenji Station 法善寺駅
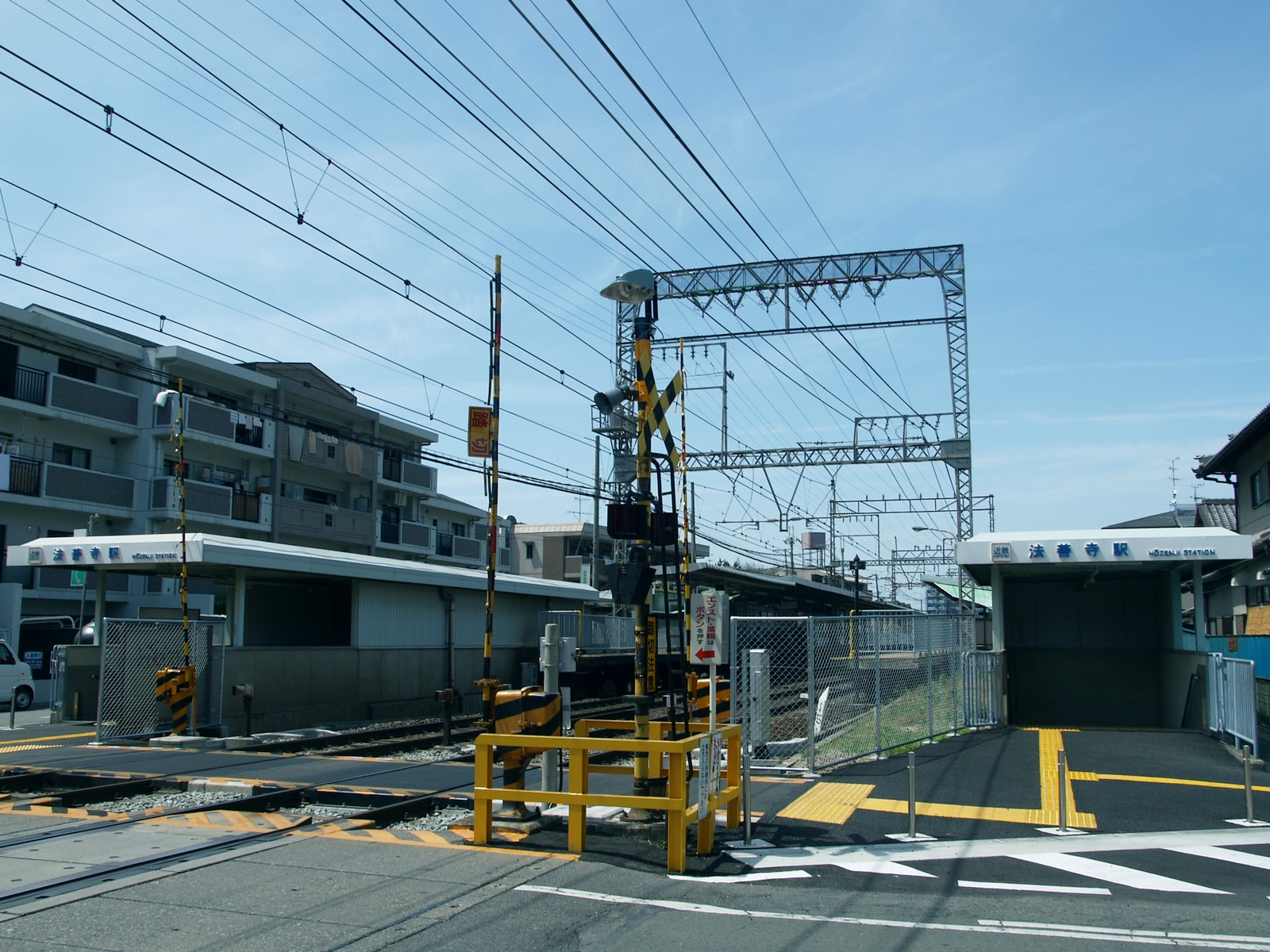

General information
- Location: 4-1-22, Hōzenji, Kashiwara, Osaka （柏原市法善寺四丁目1-22） Japan
- Coordinates: 34.5952°N 135.6262°E
- Operator: Kintetsu Railway
- Line: Osaka Line
- Connections

History
- Opened: 1 July 1927

Passengers
- 2016: 4,142 daily
Location

Hōzenji Station (法善寺駅, Hōzenji-eki) is a train station in Kashiwara, Osaka Prefecture, Japan.

== Line ==
- Kintetsu Railway
  - Osaka Line

== Layout ==
The station has two side platforms on the ground, serving one track each.

The ticket gate is only one place. The length of the platform is 6 cars (120 meter)

1	■ Osaka Line	for Kawachi-Kokubu and Yamato-Yagi
2	■ Osaka Line	for Fuse, and Osaka Uehommachi

== Adjacent stations ==
«	Service	»
Osaka Line
Onji	Local	Katashimo
Onji	Suburban Semi-Express	Katashimo
Semi-Express: Does not stop at this station
Express: Does not stop at this station
Rapid Express: Does not stop at this station
