= Sekiya Station =

Sekiya Station (関屋駅) is the name of multiple train stations in Japan:

- Sekiya Station (Nara)
- Sekiya Station (Niigata)
- Keisei-Sekiya Station
