= Onji Station =

Railway station in Yao, Osaka Prefecture, Japan

Onji Station 恩智駅
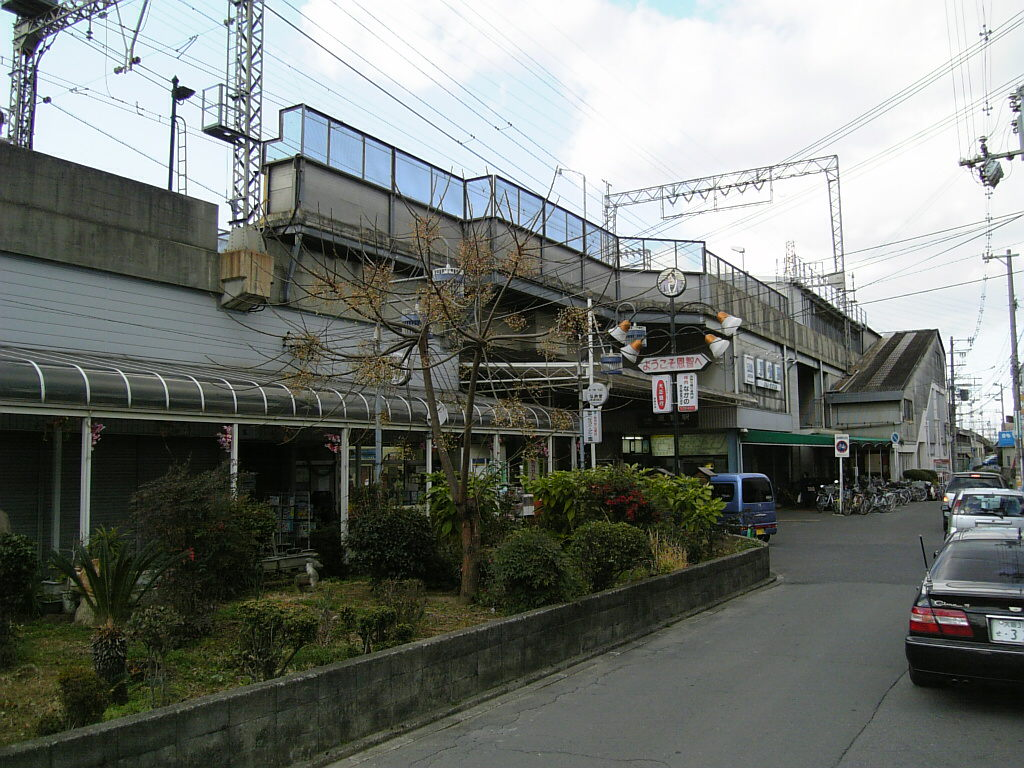
- Onji Station, January 2007

General information
- Location: 1-103, Onji-nakamachi, Yao-shi, Osaka-fu 581-0883; Japan
- Coordinates: 34.6099°N 135.6261°E
- Operator: Kintetsu Railway
- Line: Osaka Line
- Distance: 13.3 km from Ōsaka Uehommachi
- Platforms: 2 side platforms
- Connections

Other information
- Station code: D14
- Website: Official website

History
- Opened: September 30, 1925

Passengers
- FY2018: 5316 daily
Location
- Location within Osaka Prefecture Location within Japan

Onji Station (恩智駅, Onji-eki) is a passenger railway station in located in the city of Yao, Osaka Prefecture, Japan, operated by the private railway operator Kintetsu Railway. Onji is a small area just outside the center of Yao city. It takes about 30 minutes to get to downtown Osaka city (changing trains at Takayasu). Although part of Yao, Onji retains a small, almost village-like atmosphere.

== Lines ==
Onji Station is served by the Osaka Line, and is located 13.3 rail kilometers from the starting point of the line at Ōsaka Uehommachi Station.

== Station layout ==
The station consists of two elevated opposed side platforms with the station building underneath. The ticket gate is only one place. The length of the platform is 6 cars (120 meters)

=== Platforms ===
1	■ Osaka Line	for Kawachi-Kokubu and Yamato-Yagi
2	■ Osaka Line	for Fuse, and Osaka Uehommachi

== Adjacent stations ==
«	Service	»
Osaka Line
Takayasu	Local	Hōzenji
Takayasu	Suburban Semi-Express	Hōzenji
Semi-Express: Does not stop at this station
Express: Does not stop at this station
Rapid Express: Does not stop at this station

== History ==
Onji Station opened on September 30, 1925.

== Passenger statistics ==
In fiscal 2018, the station was used by an average of 5316 passengers daily.

== Surrounding area ==
- Onji Shrine
- Tokoyogihime Shrine
- Onji River

== See also ==
- List of railway stations in Japan
