= Katashimo Station =

Railway station in Kashiwara, Osaka Prefecture, Japan

Katashimo Station 堅下駅
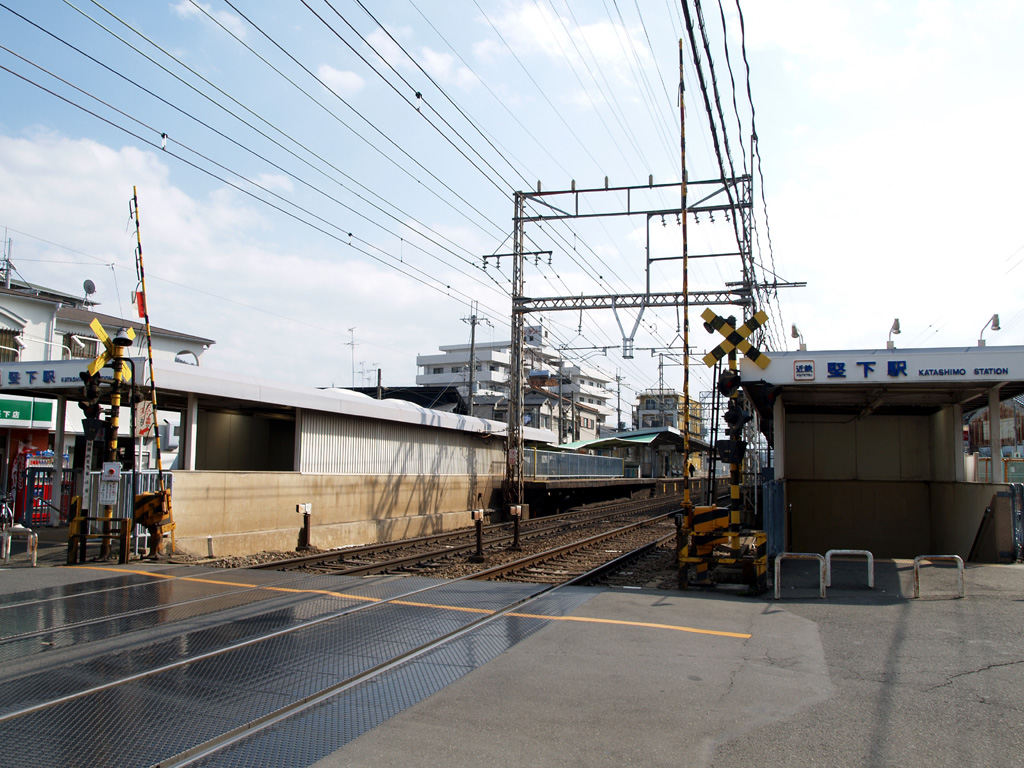

General information
- Location: 2-5-1, Ōgara, Kashiwara, Osaka （大阪府柏原市大県二丁目5-1） Japan
- Coordinates: 34.5884°N 135.6276°E
- Operator: Kintetsu Railway
- Line: Osaka Line
- Connections

History
- Opened: 1927

Passengers
- 2016: 3,692daily
Location

Katashimo Station (堅下駅, Katashimo-eki) is a train station in Kashiwara, Osaka Prefecture, Japan.

== Line ==
- Kintetsu Railway
  - Osaka Line

== Layout ==
The station has two side platforms on the ground, serving one track each.

The ticket gate is only one place. The length of the platform is 6 cars (120 meter)

1	■ Osaka Line	for Kawachi-Kokubu and Yamato-Yagi
2	■ Osaka Line	for Fuse, and Osaka Uehommachi

== Adjacent stations ==
«	Service	»
Osaka Line
Hōzenji	Local	Andō
Hōzenji	Suburban Semi-Express	Andō
Semi-Express: Does not stop at this station
Express: Does not stop at this station
Rapid Express: Does not stop at this station
