= Mito Station =

Mito Station is the name of multiple train stations in Japan.

- Mito Station (Ibaraki) - (水戸駅) in Ibaraki Prefecture
- Mito Station (Osaka) - (弥刀駅) in Osaka Prefecture
