= Yuge-dera =

Hakuhō period Buddhist temple

Yuge-dera ruins
- 由義寺跡 (Japanese)
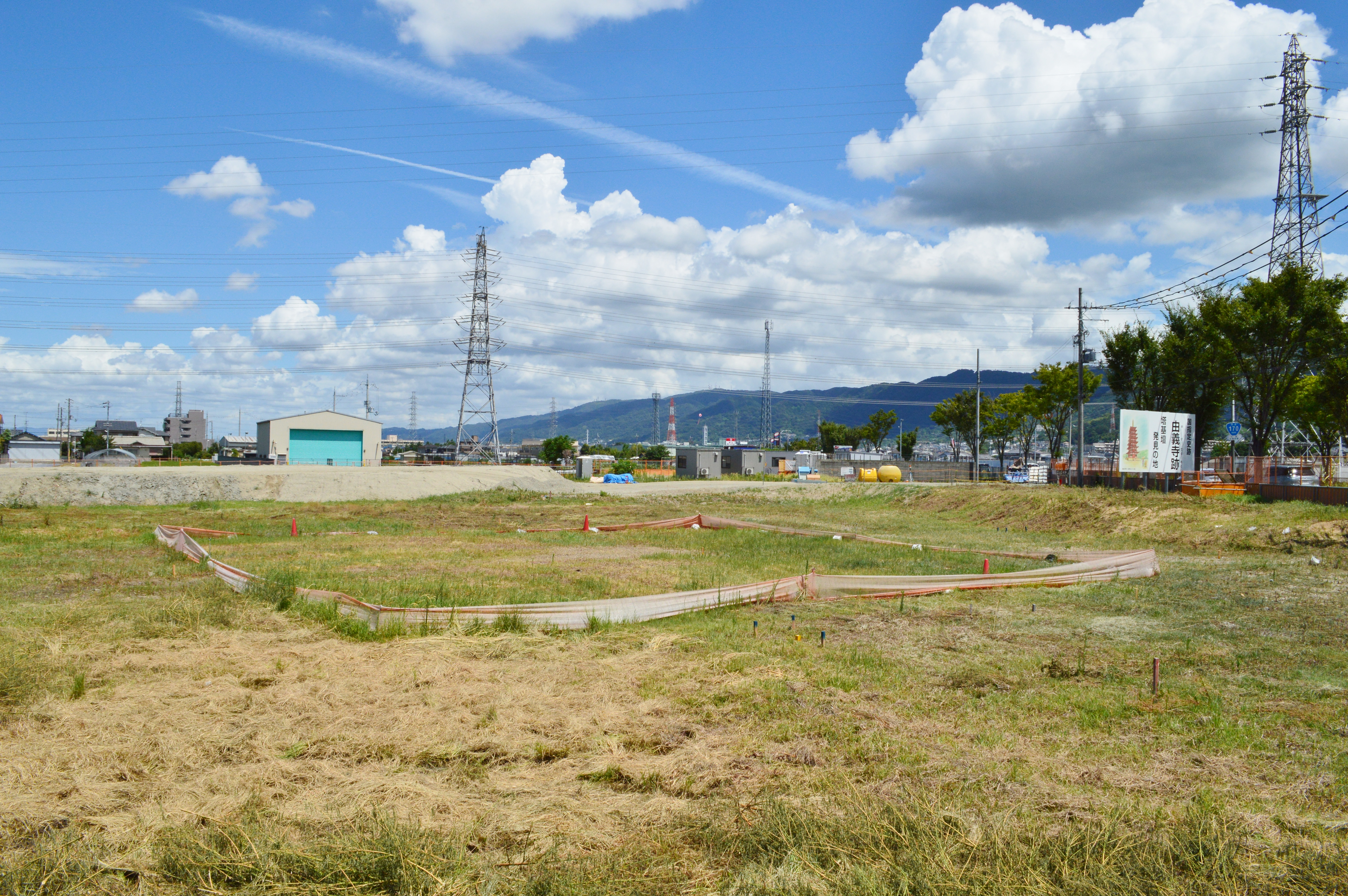
- Yuge-dera ruins

- Yuge-dera ruins Yuge-dera (Japan)
- Interactive map of Yuge-dera ruins
- 34°36′8.77″N 135°37′7.44″E
- Type: temple ruins
- Periods: Nara period
- Location: Yao, Osaka, Japan
- Region: Kansai region

History
- Built: 8th century AD

Site notes
- Public access: Yes (no public facilities)

The Yuge temple ruins (由義寺跡, Yugedera ato), also known as "Yuge-ji", or under the alternative kanji "弓削寺跡", is an archaeological site with the ruins of a Nara period Buddhist temple located in the Higashiyuge neighborhood of the city of Yao, Osaka, Japan. The temple no longer exists, but the temple grounds were designated as a National Historic Site in 2018.

== Overview ==
The temple ruins are located on in former Yuge-go, Wakae-gun, Kawachi Province, which was the ancestral home of the Yuge clan, local gentry whose most famous member was the monk Dōkyō (700–772), the favorite of Empress Shōtoku who made a failed attempt to usurp the Imperial throne. From the name of the temple, it is assumed that this was the clan temple for the Yuge clan, and the ruins are located near the Yuge Jinja, a Shinto shrine in which the ancestors of the Yuge clan are venerated as kami. The temple appears in documentary literature at the end of 742 AD. It is also mentioned in the Shoku Nihongi in an entry dated 765 AD, in which the Empress Kōken sponsored a memorial service at the temple with a donation of food for 200 families. It reappears in an entry for 770 AD noting the building of a pagoda. The year 770 is significant, as this was the period during which Empress Shōtoku had attempted to make Dōkyō emperor. A new imperial palace, the Yuge-no-miya (由義宮) had been constructed in Wakae-gun, and the surrounding area had been earmarked for a new capital city, Nishi-no-kyō (西京) which was have replaced Heijō-kyō. These plans ended with the deposition and subsequent exile of Dōkyō, and Yuge-dera also disappears from the historical record; however, there is a theory that the temple of Ryūge-ji (竜華寺) which appears in the Shoku Nihongi after this date is the same temple, and a temple named "弓削寺", which has the same pronunciation as "由義寺" is recorded in documents dated 1186.

The site of Yuge-ji was located in 2016, when a large quantity of roof tiles from the latter half of the Nara period were found. These tiles are identical to those used in the great national temples of Tōdai-ji and Kōfuku-ji. In subsequent archaeological excavations, the foundations of a pagoda measuring 20 meters on each side were unearthed. This would correspond to a tower on the same scale as Daian-ji in Nara, which was a seven-story tower, and would correspond to a temple sponsored by Dōkyō. The pagoda was destroyed by fire before the Kamakura period. In August 2017, further foundations of various buildings were found, along with the remains of a canal approximately 500 meters to the northeast of the pagoda foundation. It is believed that this canal was constructed to transport building materials needed to construct the temple. The site was proclaimed a National Historic Site in February 2018.

== See also ==
- List of Historic Sites of Japan (Osaka)
