= Sekiya Station (Nara) =

Railway station in Kashiba, Nara Prefecture, Japan

Sekiya Station 関屋駅
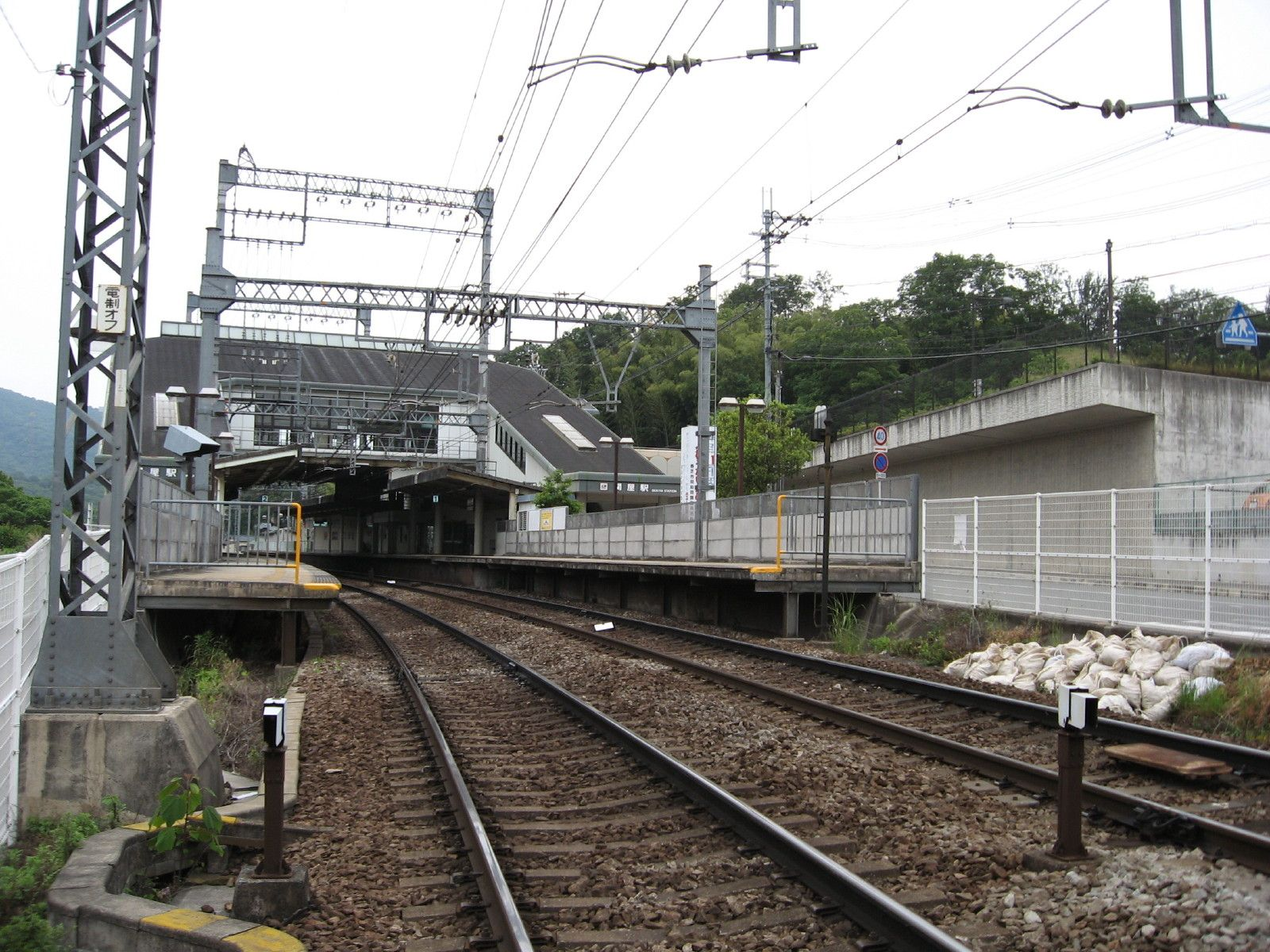
- Sekiya Station in 2007

General information
- Location: 1578-3 Sekiya, Kashiba-shi, Nara-ken 639-0255; Japan
- Coordinates: 34°33′13.6″N 135°40′4.38″E
- System: Kintetsu Railway commuter rail station
- Owner: Kintetsu Railway
- Operator: Kintetsu Railway
- Line: D Osaka Line
- Distance: 22.0 km (13.7 miles) from Osaka Uehommachi
- Platforms: 2 side platforms
- Tracks: 2
- Train operators: Kintetsu Railway
- Connections: Bus terminal

Construction
- Cycle facilities: Available
- Accessible: Yes

Other information
- Station code: D20
- Website: www.kintetsu.co.jp/station/station_info/station02022.html

History
- Opened: 1 July 1927

Passengers
- FY2019: 1961 daily

Services
| Preceding station | Kintetsu Railway | Following station |
|---|---|---|
| Ōsaka-Kyōikudai-mae towards Osaka Uehommachi | Osaka Line Local Semi-Express | Nijō towards Ise-Nakagawa |
Location

Sekiya Station (関屋駅, Sekiya-eki) is a passenger railway station located in the city of Kashiba, Nara Prefecture, Japan. It is operated by the private transportation company, Kintetsu Railway.

== Line ==
Sekiya Station is served by the Osaka Line and is 22.0 kilometers from the starting point of the line at Ōsaka Uehommachi.

== Layout ==
The station is an above-ground station with two opposed side platforms and two tracks. It has an elevated station building and three exits, located to the north, northeast, and southeast. There is only one ticket gate. The station is staffed.

== Platforms ==
| 1 | ■ D Osaka Line | for Goido, Yamato-Yagi, and Nabari |
| 2 | ■ D Osaka Line | for Kawachi-Kokubu, and Osaka Uehommachi |

== History ==
Sekiya Station was opened 1 July 1927 as a station on the Osaka Electric Tramway Yagi Line. It became a Kansai Express Railway station due to a company merger with Sangu Express Railway on 15 March 1941, and through a subsequent merger became a station on the Kintetsu Railway on 1 July 1944.

== Passenger statistics ==
In fiscal 2019 the station was used by an average of 1961 passengers daily (boarding passengers only).

== Surrounding area ==
- Kashiba City Kashiba Nishi Junior High School
- Kashiba City Sekiya Elementary School
- Chiben Gakuen Nara College Elementary, Middle and High School

== See also ==
- List of railway stations in Japan
