= Ōsaka-Kyōikudai-mae Station =

Railway station in Kashiwara, Osaka Prefecture, Japan

Ōsakakyōikudaimae Station 大阪教育大前駅
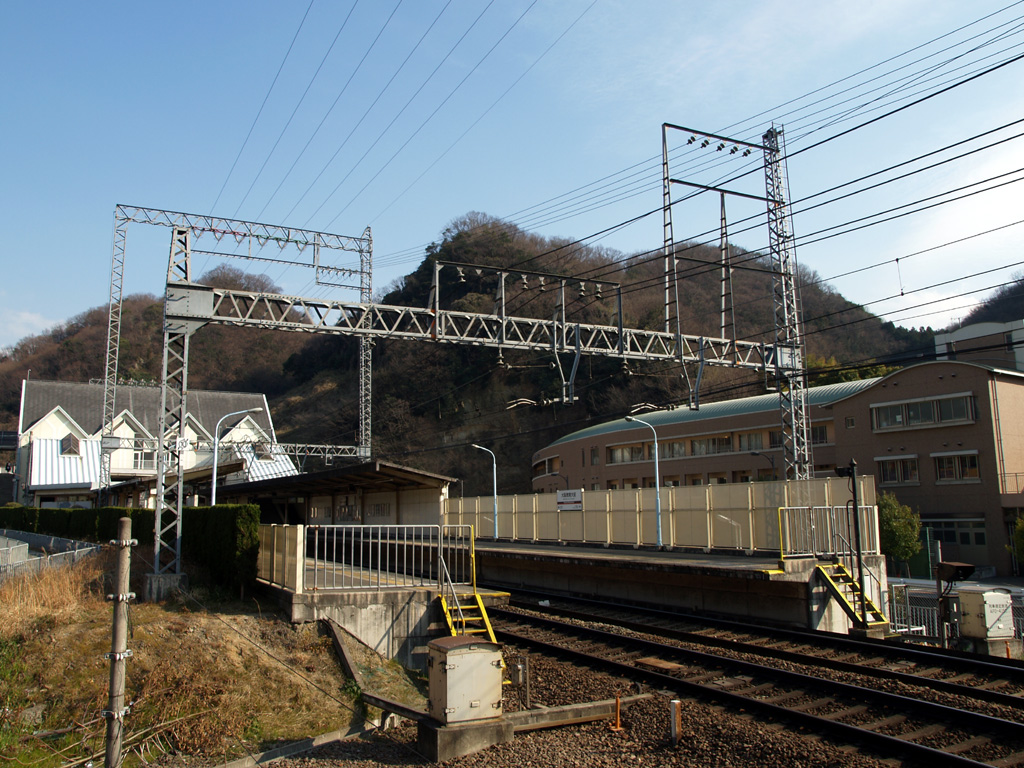

General information
- Location: 4555-1, Asahigaoka 4-chōme, Kashiwara, Osaka （大阪府柏原市旭ケ丘四丁目4555-1） Japan
- Coordinates: 34°33′19″N 135°38′42″E
- Operator: Kintetsu Railway
- Line: Osaka Line

History
- Opened: 1991

Passengers
- 2016: 3,636
Location

Ōsakakyōikudaimae Station (大阪教育大前駅, Ōsakakyōikudaimae-eki) is a railway station on the Kintetsu Railway Osaka Line in Kashiwara, Osaka Prefecture, Japan, serving Osaka Kyoiku University.

== Layout ==
The station has two side platforms serving one track each.

=== Platforms ===
1	■ Osaka Line	for Goido, Yamato-Yagi and Nabari
2	■ Osaka Line	for Kawachi-Kokubu, and Osaka Uehommachi

== Number of users ==
In recent years, the survey results of the passengers on the day of the station are as follows.

Year Number of people usur

- 2015 11 10 6,455
- 2012 11 13 6,204
- 2010 11月9 6,056
- 2008 11 18 6,364
- 2005 11 8 5,781

== Surroundings ==
- Osaka Kyoiku University Kashiwara Campus
- Kokubu Hospital

== Adjacent stations ==
«	Service	»
Osaka Line
Kawachi-Kokubu	Local	Sekiya
Kawachi-Kokubu	Semi-Express; Suburban Semi-Express	Sekiya
Express: Does not stop at this station
Rapid Express: Does not stop at this station
