= Mito Station (Osaka) =

Railway station in Higashiōsaka, Osaka Prefecture, Japan

Mito Station 弥刀駅
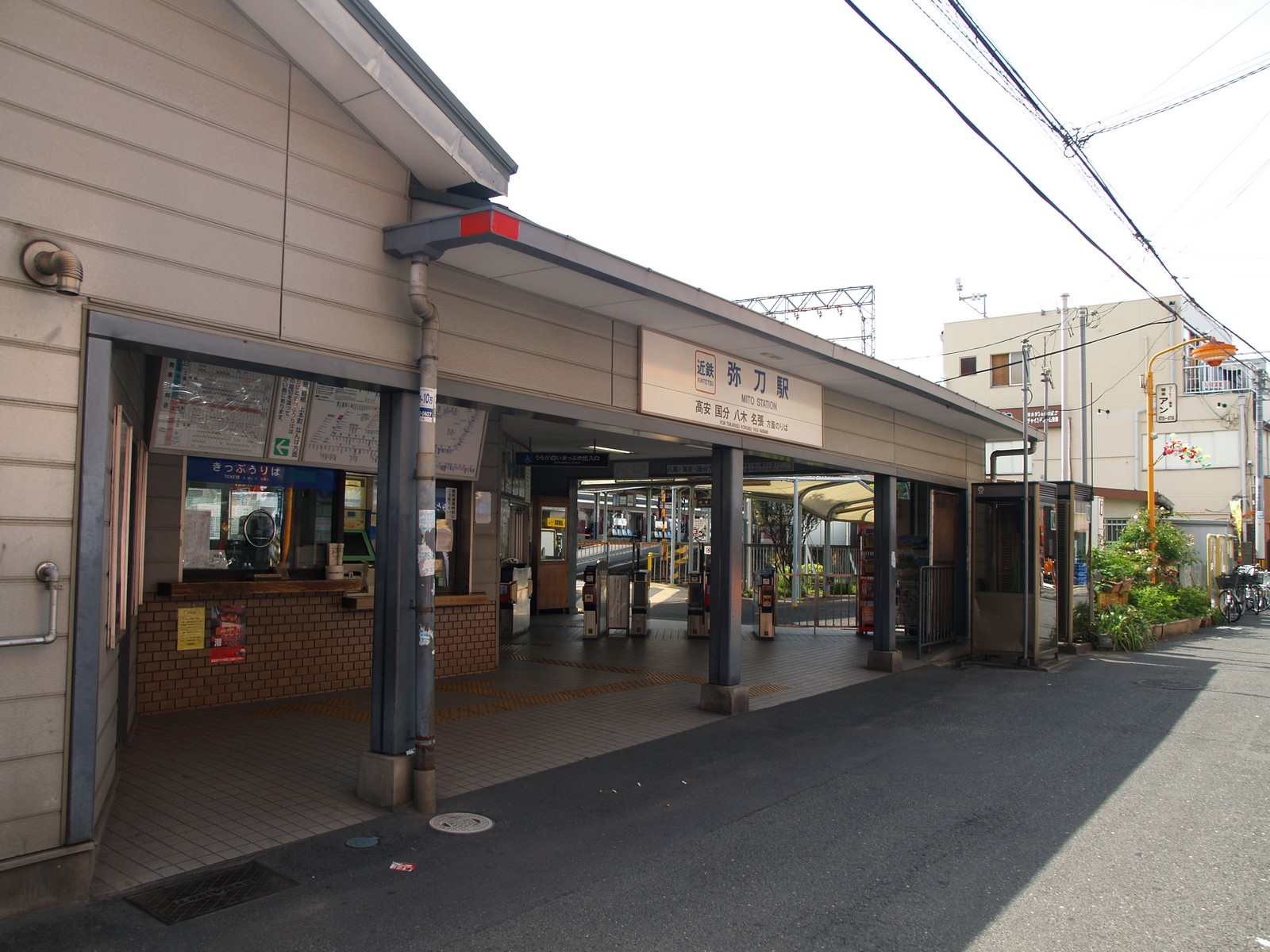
- entrance for Yamato-Yagi and Nabari

General information
- Location: 3-1-22, Tomoi, Higashiōsaka-shi, Osaka-fu 577-0816; Japan
- Coordinates: 34°38′27.01″N 135°35′2.34″E
- Operator: Kintetsu Railway
- Line: Osaka Line
- Distance: 7.4 km from Ōsaka Uehommachi
- Platforms: 2 island platforms
- Connections

Other information
- Station code: D09
- Website: Official website

History
- Opened: December 10, 1925

Passengers
- FY2018: 10,299 daily
Location
- Location within Osaka Prefecture Location within Japan

Mito Station (弥刀駅, Mito-eki) is a passenger railway station in located in the city of Higashiōsaka, Osaka Prefecture, Japan, operated by the private railway operator Kintetsu Railway.

== Lines ==
Mito Station is served by the Osaka Line, and is located 7.4 rail kilometers from the starting point of the line at Ōsaka Uehommachi Station.

== Station layout ==
The station consists of two ground-level island platform. There is no interconnection between the platforms; passengers wishing to change platforms must exit the station, cross via a level crossing, and re-enter from the opposite side.

=== Platforms ===
| 1, 2 | ■ Osaka Line | for Kawachi-Kokubu, and Yamato-Yagi |
| 3, 4 | ■ Osaka Line | for Fuse and Osaka Uehommachi |

== Adjacent stations ==
| « | Service | » |
Osaka Line
| Nagase | Local | Kyūhōjiguchi |
Suburban Semi-Express: Does not stop at this station
Semi-Express: Does not stop at this station
Express: Does not stop at this station
Rapid Express: Does not stop at this station

== History ==
Mito Station opened on December 10, 1925.

== Passenger statistics ==
In fiscal 2018, the station was used by an average of 10,299 passengers daily.

== Surrounding area ==
- Nagase River
- Iyakatana Shrine
- Mitsurugi Shrine
- Kanaoka Park
- Higashi Osaka Municipal Kanaoka Junior High School

== See also ==
- List of railway stations in Japan
