= Tadashi Ōishi =

Japanese shogi player (born 1989)

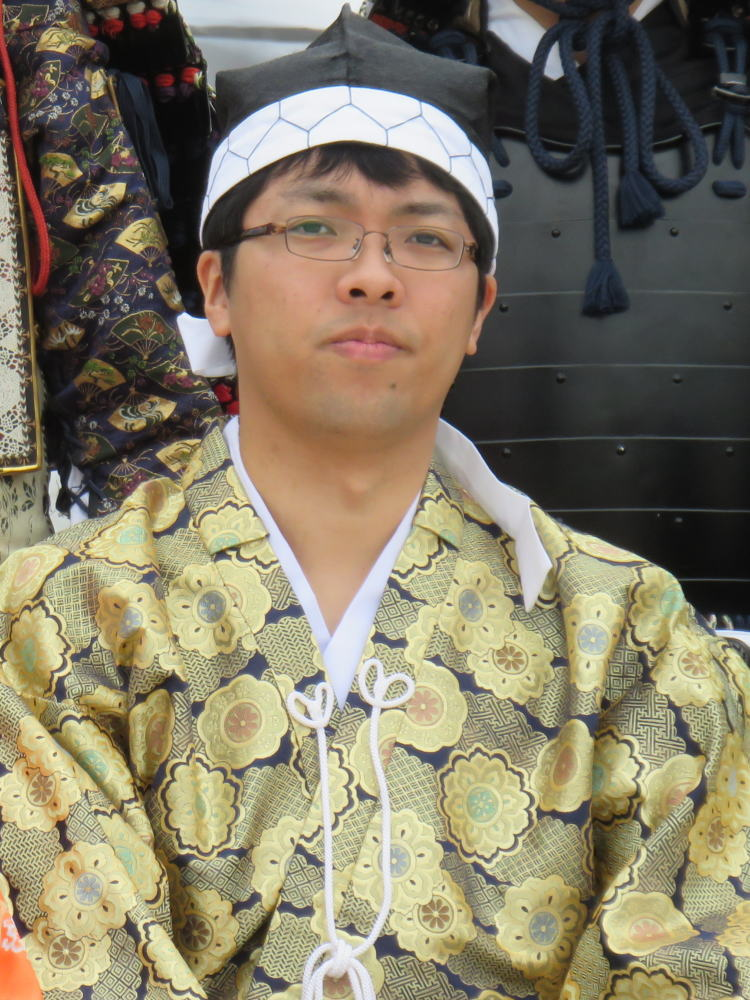
- Ōishi at a November 2019 human shogi event in Himeji, Japan.
- Native name: 大石直嗣
- Born: September 16, 1989 (age 35)
- Hometown: Yao, Osaka

Career
- Achieved professional status: April 1, 2009 (aged 19)
- Badge Number: 275
- Rank: 7-dan
- Teacher: Nobuo Mori (7-dan)
- Meijin class: B1
- Ryūō class: 3

Websites
- JSA profile page

Tadashi Ōishi (大石 直嗣, Ōishi Tadashi; born September 16, 1989) is a Japanese professional shogi player ranked 7-dan.

== Early life and apprenticeship ==
Tadashi Ōishi was born in Yao, Osaka on September 16, 1989. He learned how to play shogi from his father when he was a first-grade elementary school student. He represented Osaka Prefecture in the 26th Elementary School Student Meijin Tournament in March 2001 and then entered the Japan Shogi Association's apprentice school in September of that same year at the rank of 6-kyū as a student of shogi professional Nobuo Mori. He was promoted to the rank of 1-dan in July 2001.

Ōishi was promoted to 3-dan in 2006 and finished the 40th 3-dan League (October 2006 – March 2009) tied for third place with a record of 13 wins and 5 losses. The following season, Ōishi moved up to the number two position in the league table, but ended up finishing with a record of 7 wins and 11 losses. In his third season of 3-dan League play, Ōishi finished with record of 12 wins and 6 losses, winning his last six games to finish tied for fourth place. Ōishi finished the 43rd 3-dan league (April 2008 – September 2008) with a record of 13 wins and 5 losses, once again tying for third place. He finally obtained full professional status and the rank of 4-dan in April 2009 after finishing second in the 44th 3-dan League (October 2008 – March 2009) with a record of 13 wins and 5 losses.

== Shogi professional ==
=== Promotion history ===
The promotion history for Ōishi is as follows:

- 6-kyū: September 25, 2001
- 4-dan: April 1, 2009
- 5-dan: April 22, 2013
- 6-dan: May 15, 2013
- 7-dan: November 1, 2017

=== Awards and honors ===
Ōishi received the Japan Shogi Association Annual Shogi Award for "Best New Player" in 2013.
