= Takayasu Station =

Railway station in Yao, Osaka Prefecture, Japan

Takayasu Station 高安駅
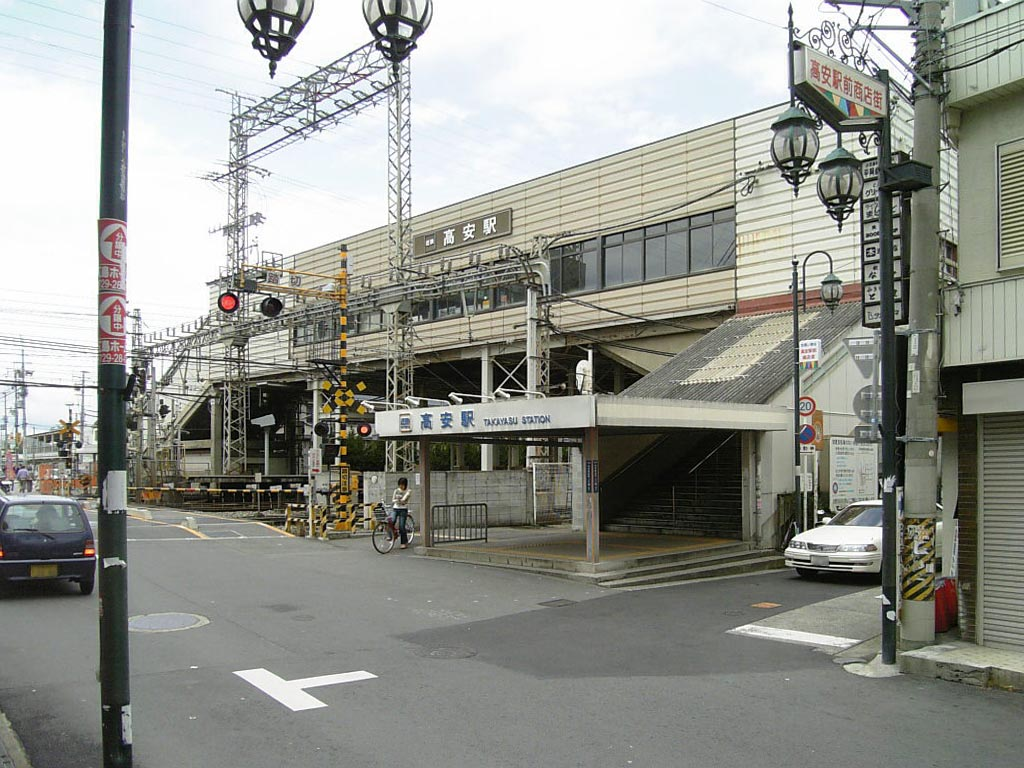
- Takayasu Station East exit, May 2006

General information
- Location: 1-1-46, Yamamoto-Takayasuchō, Yao-shi, Osaka-fu 581-0021; Japan
- Coordinates: 34.6189°N 135.6246°E
- Operator: Kintetsu Railway
- Line: Osaka Line
- Distance: 12.2 km from Ōsaka Uehommachi
- Platforms: 2 island platforms
- Connections

Other information
- Station code: D13
- Website: Official website

History
- Opened: September 30, 1925

Passengers
- FY2018: 11,202 daily
Location
- Location within Osaka Prefecture Location within Japan

Takayasu Station (高安駅, Takayasu-eki) is a passenger railway station in located in the city of Yao, Osaka Prefecture, Japan, operated by the private railway operator Kintetsu Railway.

== Lines ==
Takayasu Station is served by the Osaka Line, and is located 12.2 rail kilometers from the starting point of the line at Ōsaka Uehommachi Station. The ticket gate is only one place. The length of the platform is 10 cars (about 200 meter)

== Station layout ==
The station consists of two elevated island platforms with the station building underneath.

=== Platforms ===
1, 2	■ Osaka Line	for Yamato-Yagi, Nabari and Ise-Nakagawa
3, 4	■ Osaka Line	for Fuse and Osaka Uehommachi

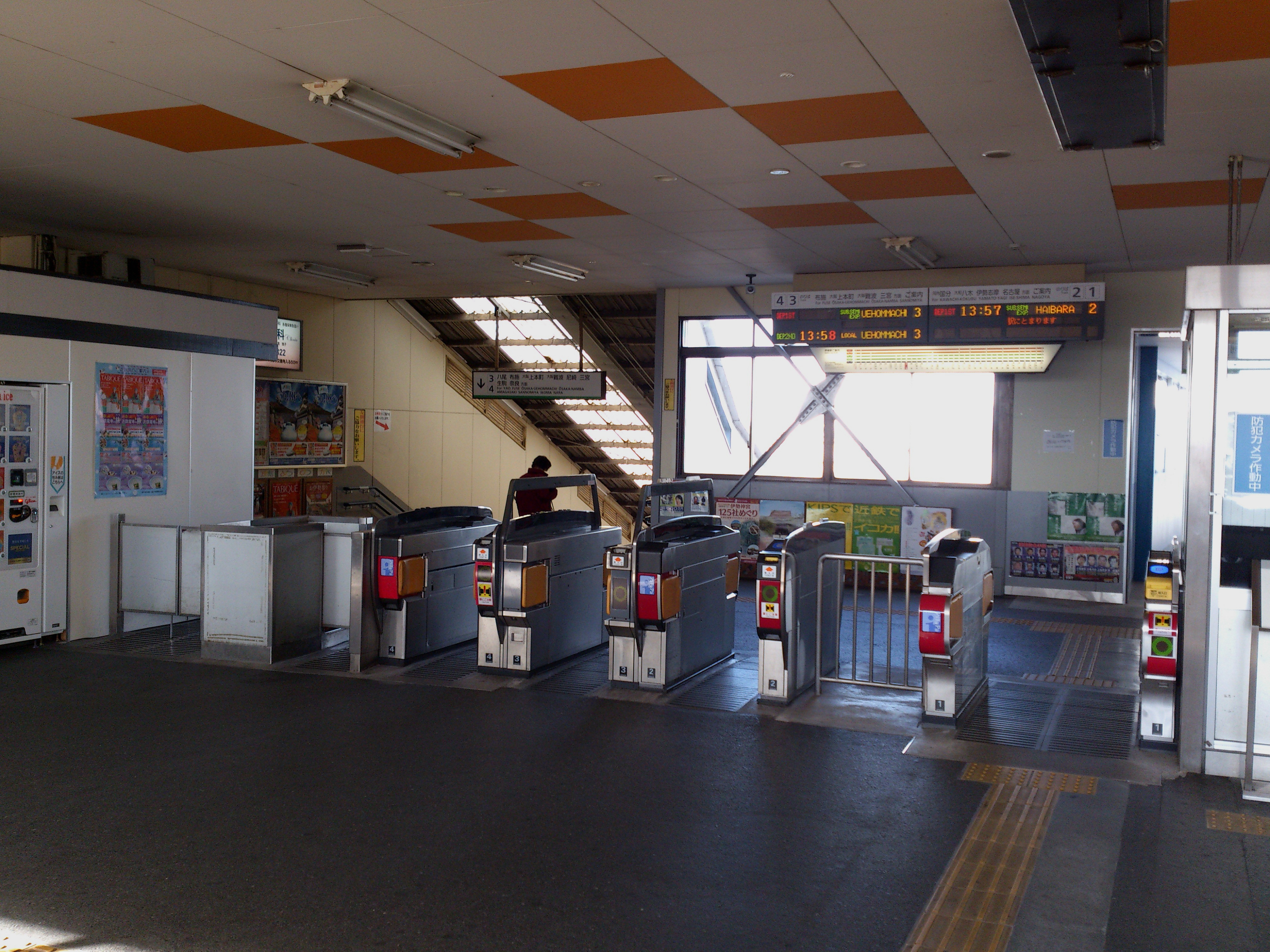
Ticket gates

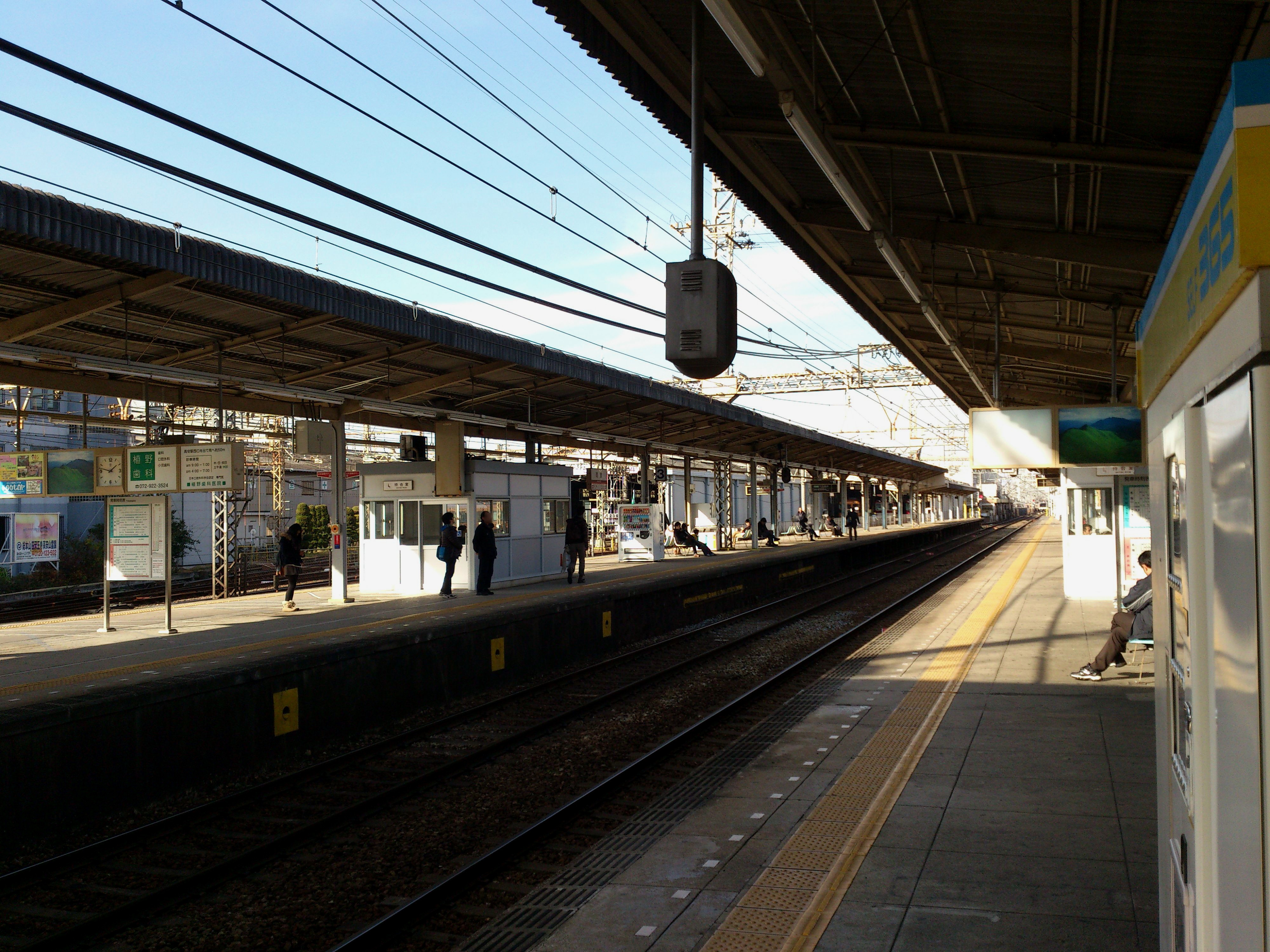
Platform

== Adjacent stations ==
«	Service	»
Osaka Line
Kawachi-Yamamoto	Local	Onji
Kawachi-Yamamoto	Suburban Semi-Express	Onji
Kawachi-Yamamoto	Semi-Express	Kawachi-Kokubu
Express: Does not stop at this station
Rapid Express: Does not stop at this station

== History ==
Takayasu Station opened on September 30, 1925.

== Passenger statistics ==
In fiscal 2018, the station was used by an average of 11,202 passengers daily.

== Surrounding area ==
- Osaka Prefectural Route 181

West side
- Takayasu Depot, Takayasu Workshop
- Tamakushi River
- Yao Yamamoto Baseball Stadium
- Yao Takayasu Post Office
- Konko Yao Junior and Senior High School
East side
- Takayasu-ekimae-dori Shotengai
- Onji River

== See also ==
- List of railway stations in Japan
