= Takayasu Senzuka Kofun =

Takayasu Senzuka Kofun Cluster
- 高安古墳群 (Japanese)
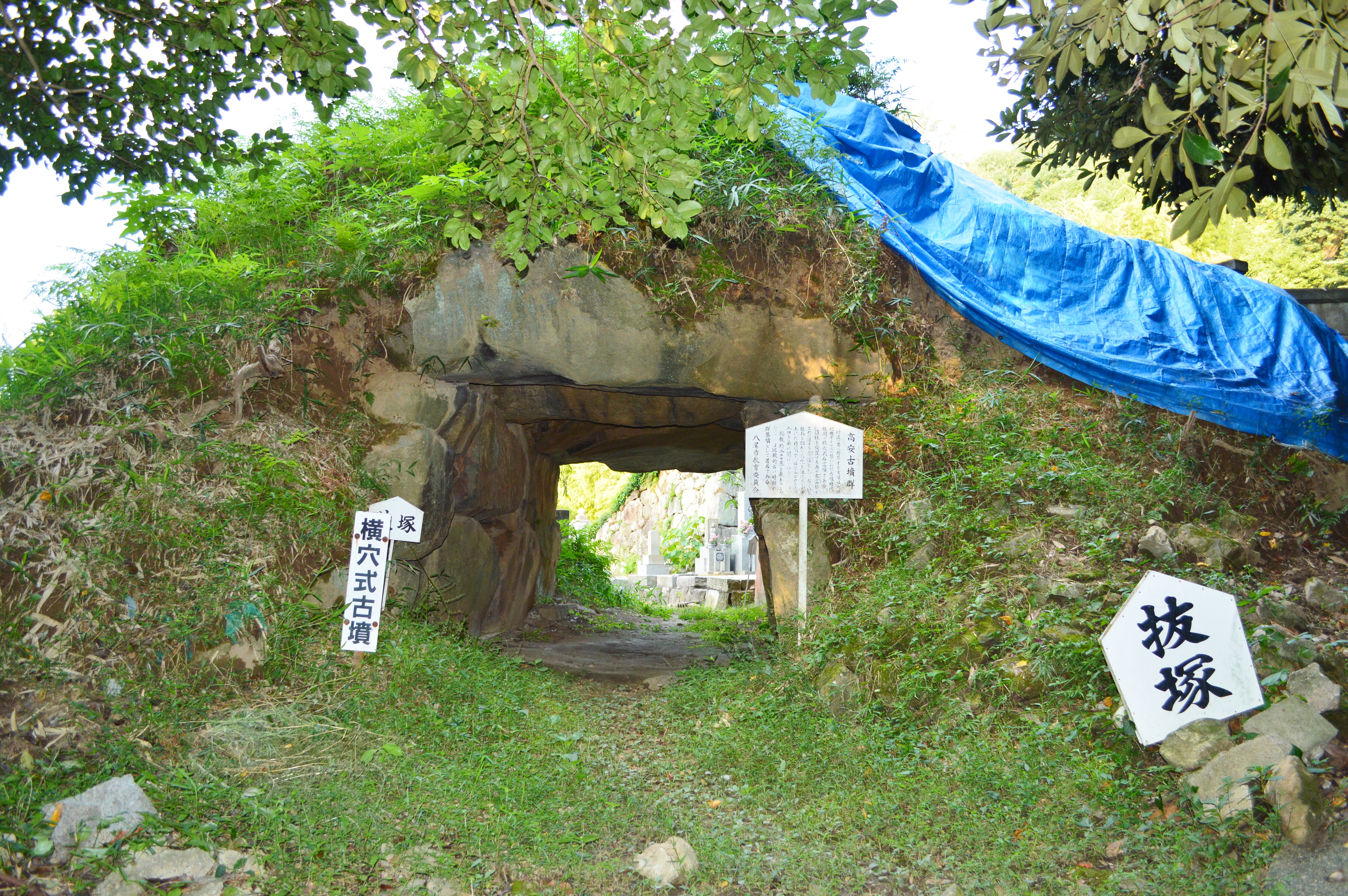
- Okubo-Yamatake Kofun Group-7

- Takayasu Senzuka Kofun Cluster Takayasu Senzuka Kofun (Japan)
- Interactive map of Takayasu Senzuka Kofun Cluster
- 34°37′19.9″N 135°38′50.8″E
- Type: Kofun
- Periods: Kofun period
- Location: Yao, Osaka, Japan
- Region: Kansai region

History
- Built: c.6th to 7th century

Site notes
- Public access: Yes (Park)

The Takayasu Senzuka Kofun Cluster (高安古墳群, Takayasu Senzuka Kofun gun) is a group of Kofun period burial mounds, distributed around the foot of Mount Takayasu at elevations of 50 to 300 meters, in the city of Yao, Osaka Prefecture. in the Kansai region of Japan. The tumulus group was designated a National Historic Site of Japan in 2015.

== Overview ==
The Takayasu Senzuka Kofun Cluster consists of over 200 tumuli in the central Takayasu neighborhood of the city of Yao. These are the survivors of more than 600 tumuli mapped in early 20th century surveys, which led to the area being named "Senzuka" or "1000 tumuli". Most of these tumuli were small, circular, enpun (円墳)-style kofun, with a horizontal-type stone burial chamber and a diameter of about 10 to 20 meters, and are orientated facing south. These were constructed between the 6th and 7th centuries, or at the very end of the Kofun period, and into the Asuka period. In the late 19th century, American archaeologist Edward S. Morse surveyed and sketched Kaizanzuka Kofun in the cluster, and introduced it as “Dolmen ancient tomb of Japan”. In later research William Gowland tried to take pictures of Nishitsuzuka Kofun and published a thesis as “Dolmen of double chamber” in 1897. Tsuboi Shōgorō, a professor at Tokyo Imperial University and one of the pioneers of Japanese archaeology and anthropology published a thesis, "Same origin theory of ancient tombs / graves and dolmens" in 1888.

From the style of construction, grave goods and fragments of Korean-style pottery found in the vicinity, the graves are believed to have been constructed by toraijin immigrants to Japan from Baekje, many of whom are recorded as having settled in the area around the present city of Yao. The cluster can be divided into four groups of tumuli.

- Ōkubo/Yakatake sub-group

This group contains the Kawachi Kofun (Ōkubo/Yamatake No.36 Kofun), which has lost its mound and is an exposed stone burial chamber. Also of note is the Shunto-Kumarukagamizuka (Ōkubo/Yamatake No. 27 Kofun) located at the south of the graveyard of the temple of Raiko-ji.

- Hattorigawa sub-group

This group contains the Nishitsuzuka Kofun (Hattorigawa No.25 Kofun), which has a collapsed mound, exposing a part of the two burial chambers, which are vertically connected.

- Kōrigawa sub-group

The group contains the Kaizanzuka Kofun (Kōrigawa No.1 Kofun in the precincts of Hōzō-ji temple): The burial chamber is about 15.7 m^{2}, and is the largest in the cluster.

The Kōrigawa-Higashizuka Kofun is located about 50 meters west from Kōrigawa crossroad of Japan National Route 170. It was constructed at the end of the fifth century and a circular‐shaped tomb with rectangular frontage. The northern end has a mound about 50 meters in diameter. Many grave goods were excavated from the burial chamber at the time it was destroyed to create new farmland in 1897. A further rescue archaeology survey was conducted when the area was marked for residential development in 2001.

Kōrigawa-Nishizuka Kofun is located about 100 meters to the west of the Kōrigawa-Higashizuka Kofun. It is a circular tumulus with rectangular northern frontage and has a mound about 60 meters in diameter. Many grave goods were excavated from the burial chamber at the time it was destroyed in 1902.

- Kurotani sub-group

== Gallery ==
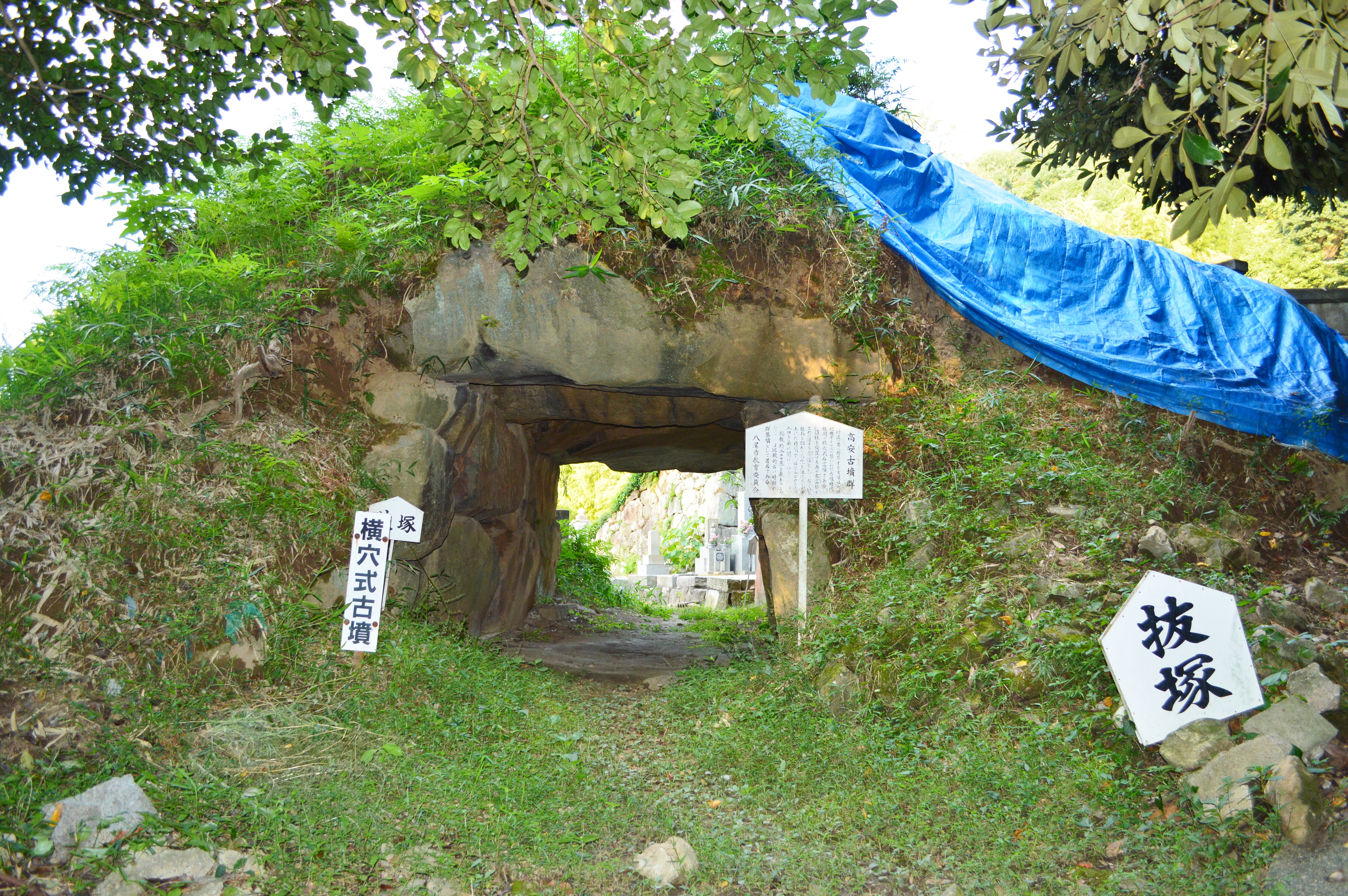
Okubo / Yamabata No. 7 Tumulus (Nukizuka Kofun)

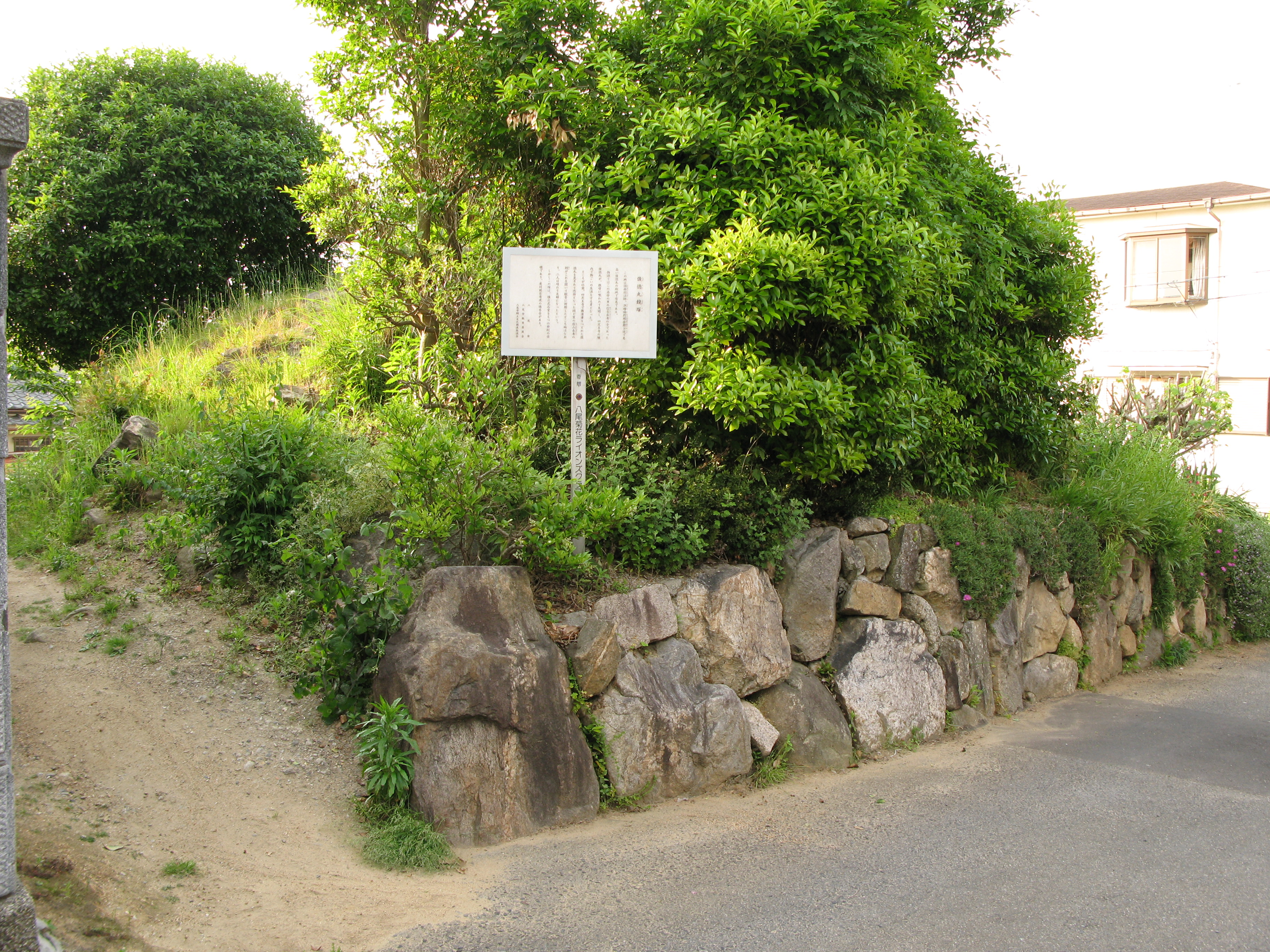
Okubo / Yamabata No.27 Tumulus（Shuntokumaru-Kagamizuka Kofun

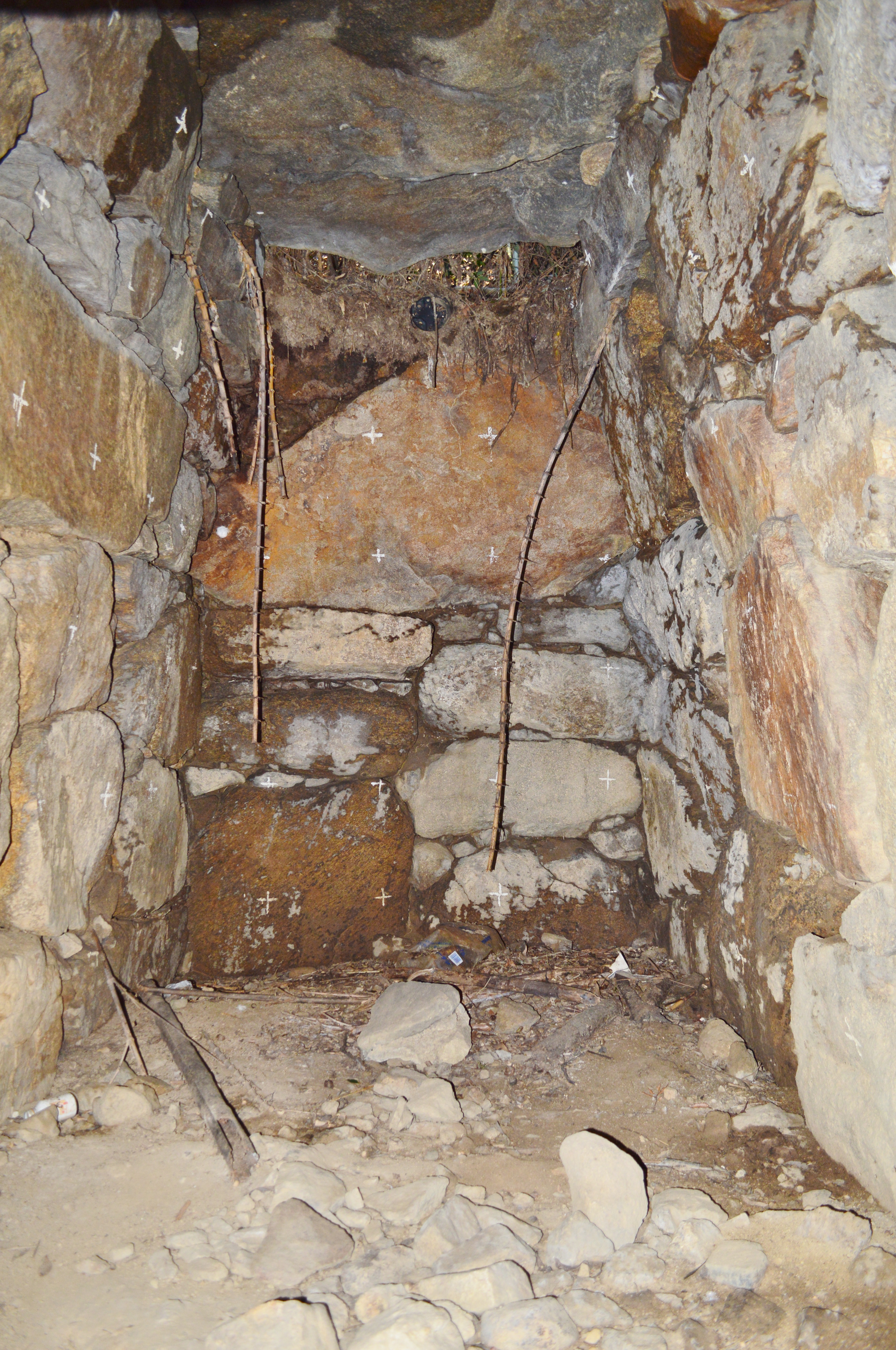
Hattorigawa No. 1 Tumulus, facing back wall. A stone shelf is attached to the left of the center.

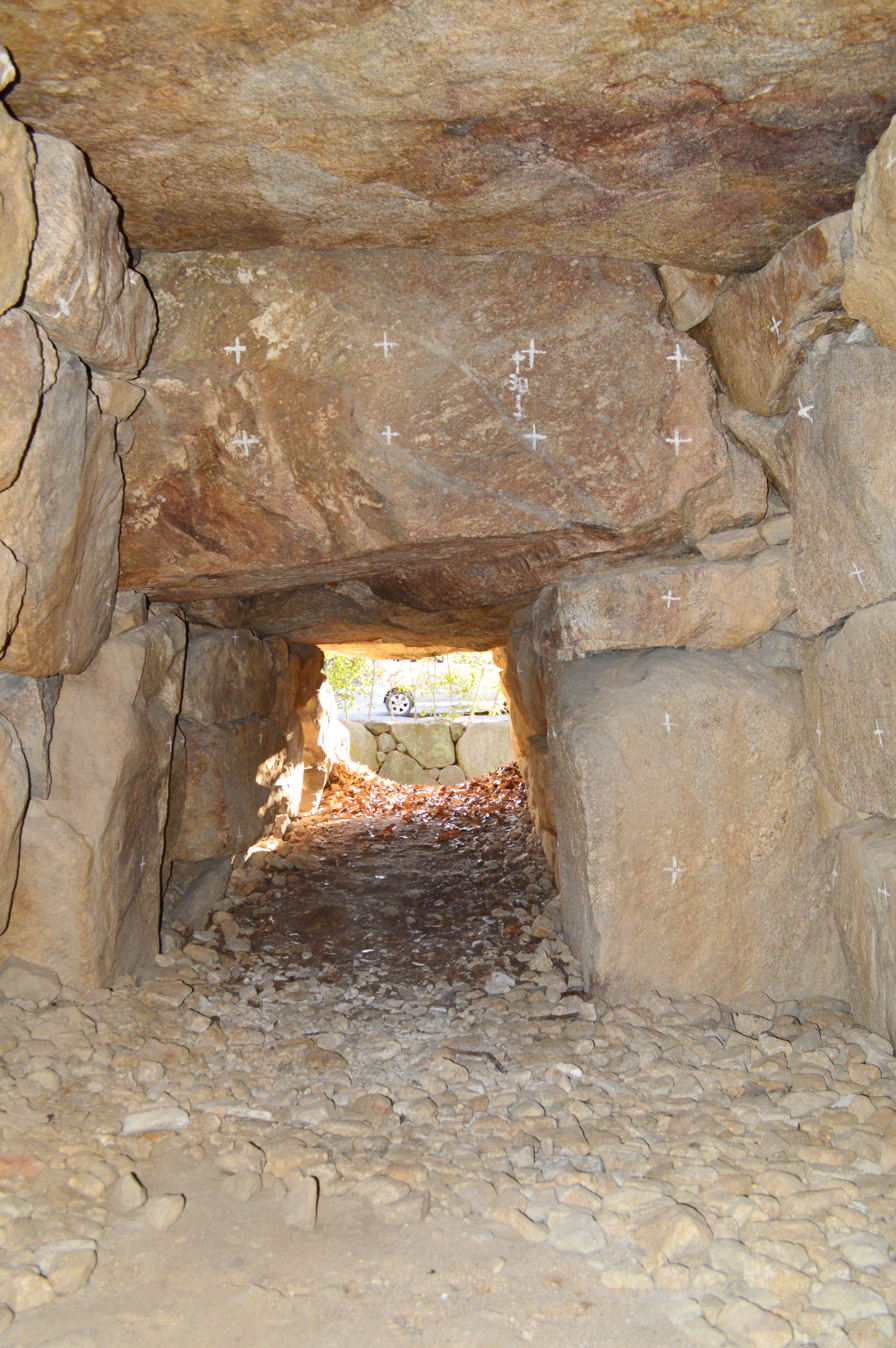
Hattorigawa No. 7 Tumulus, facing entourage

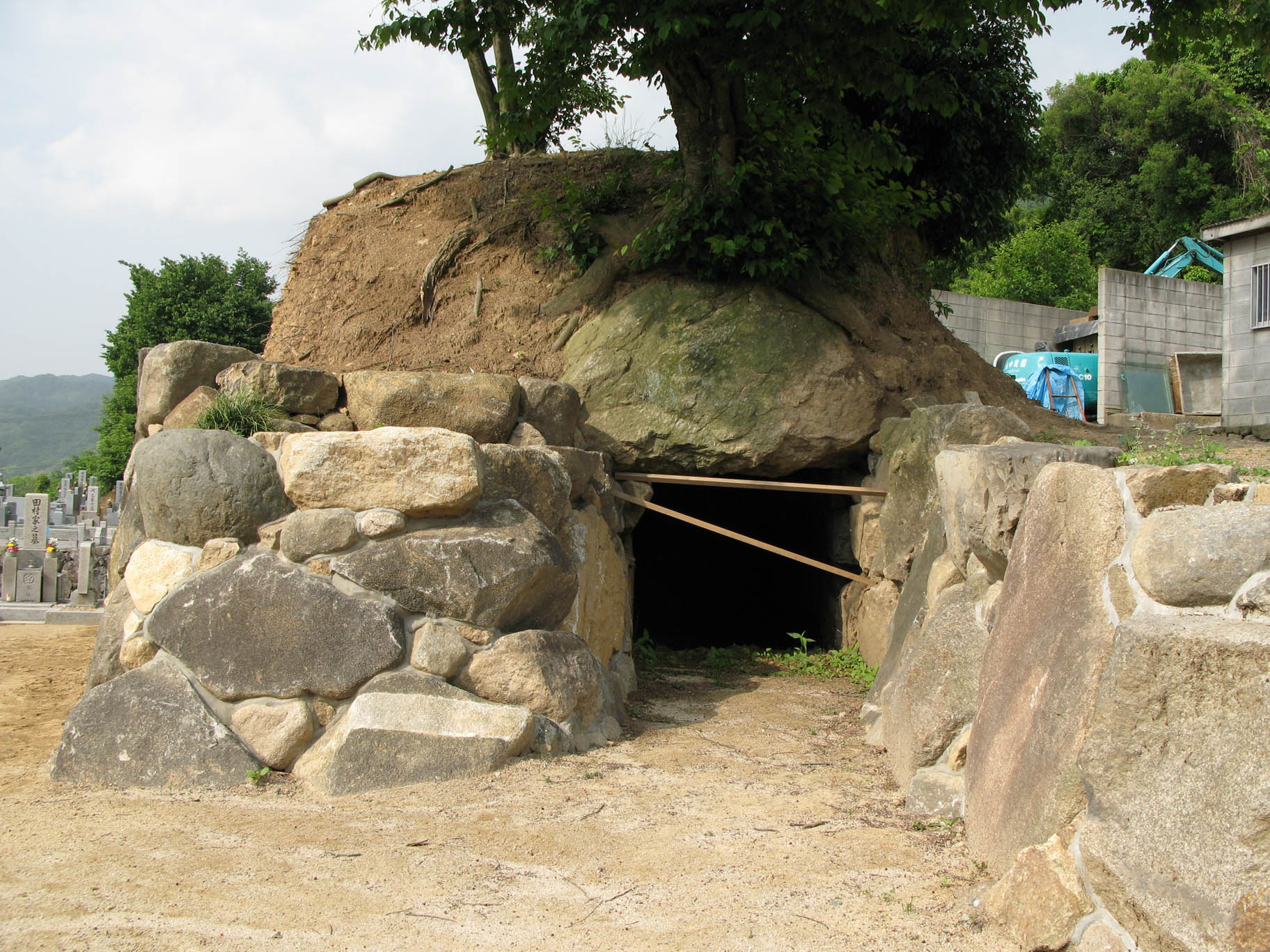
Hattorigawa No. 10 Tumulus

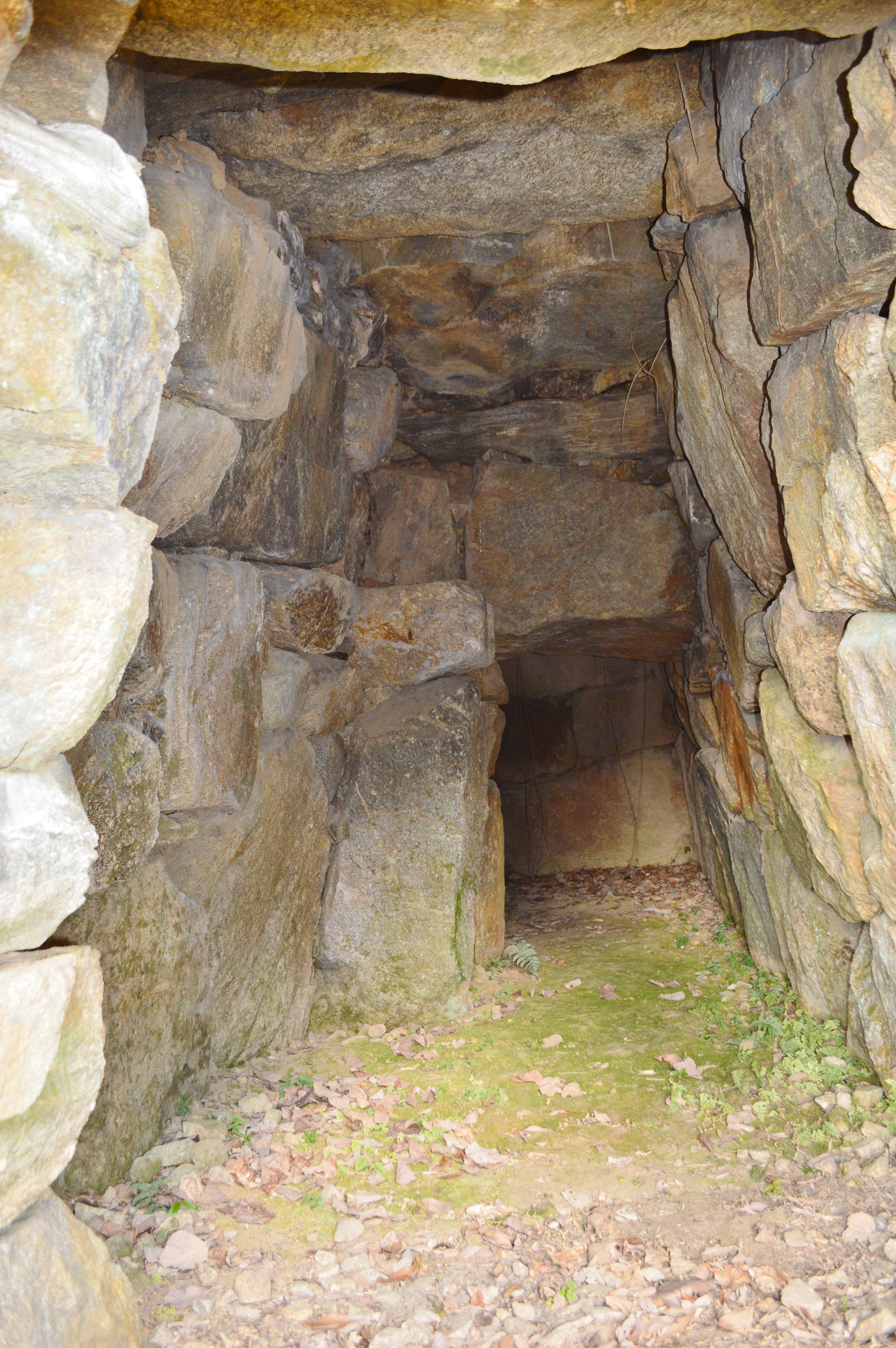
Hattorigawa No. 25 Tumulus (Nimurozuka Kofun) facing back wall; double front-back burial chamber

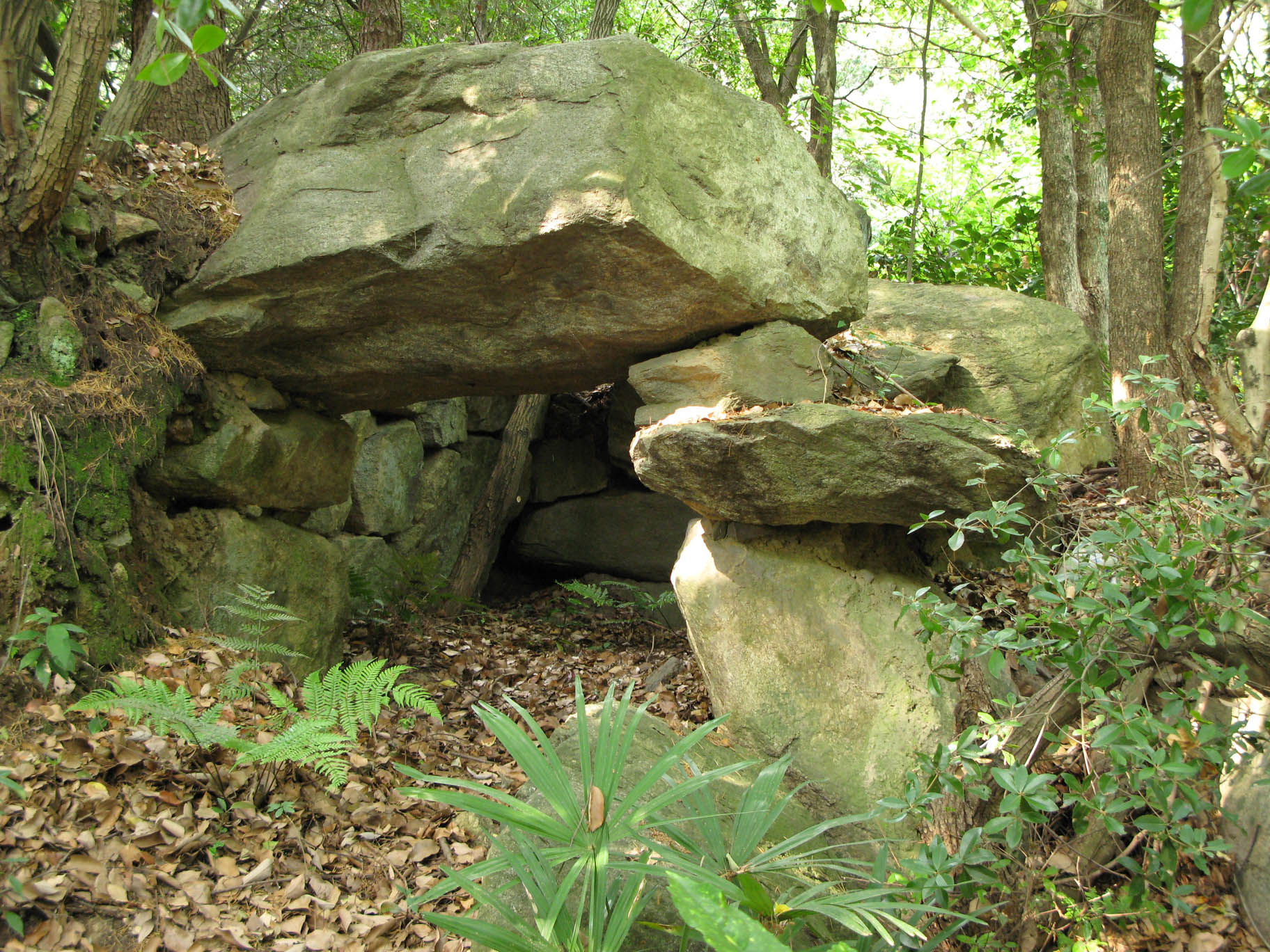
Hattorigawa No. 46 Tumulus

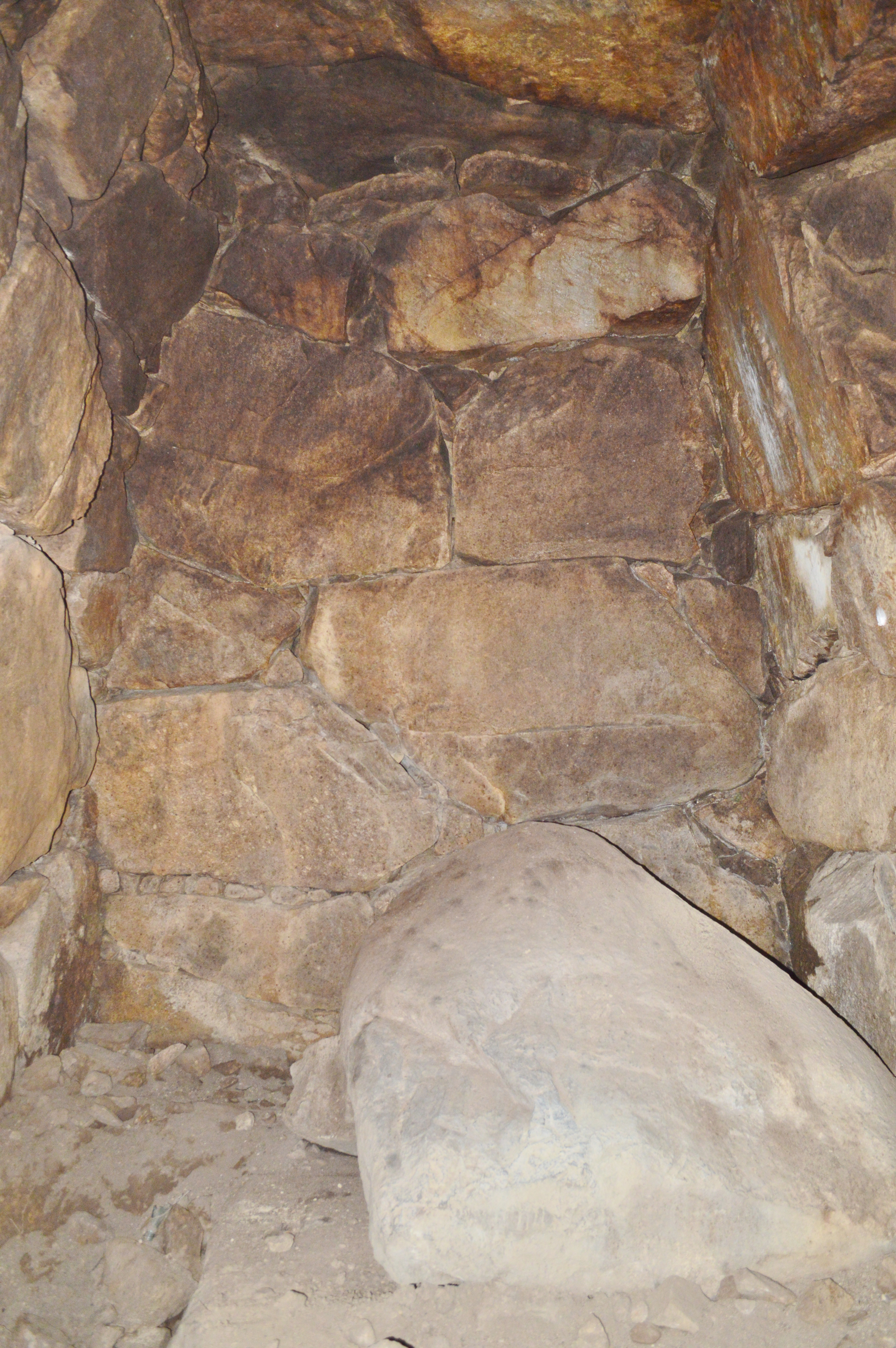
Hattorigawa No. 90 Tumulus (Tsukagami Kofun) Two-layer burial chamber

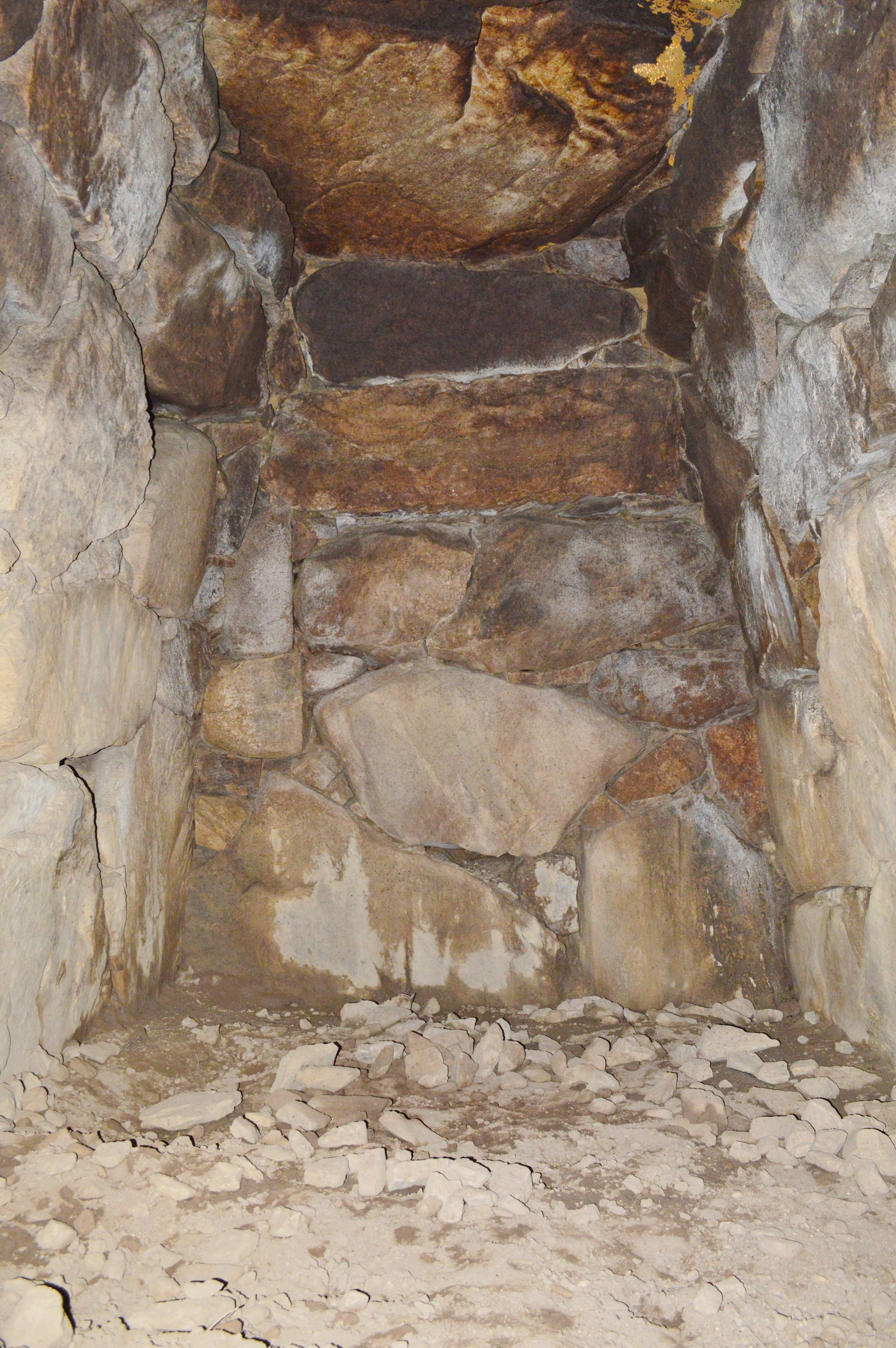
Hattorigawa No. 91 Tumulus (Tsukashita Kofun) Two-layer burial chamber

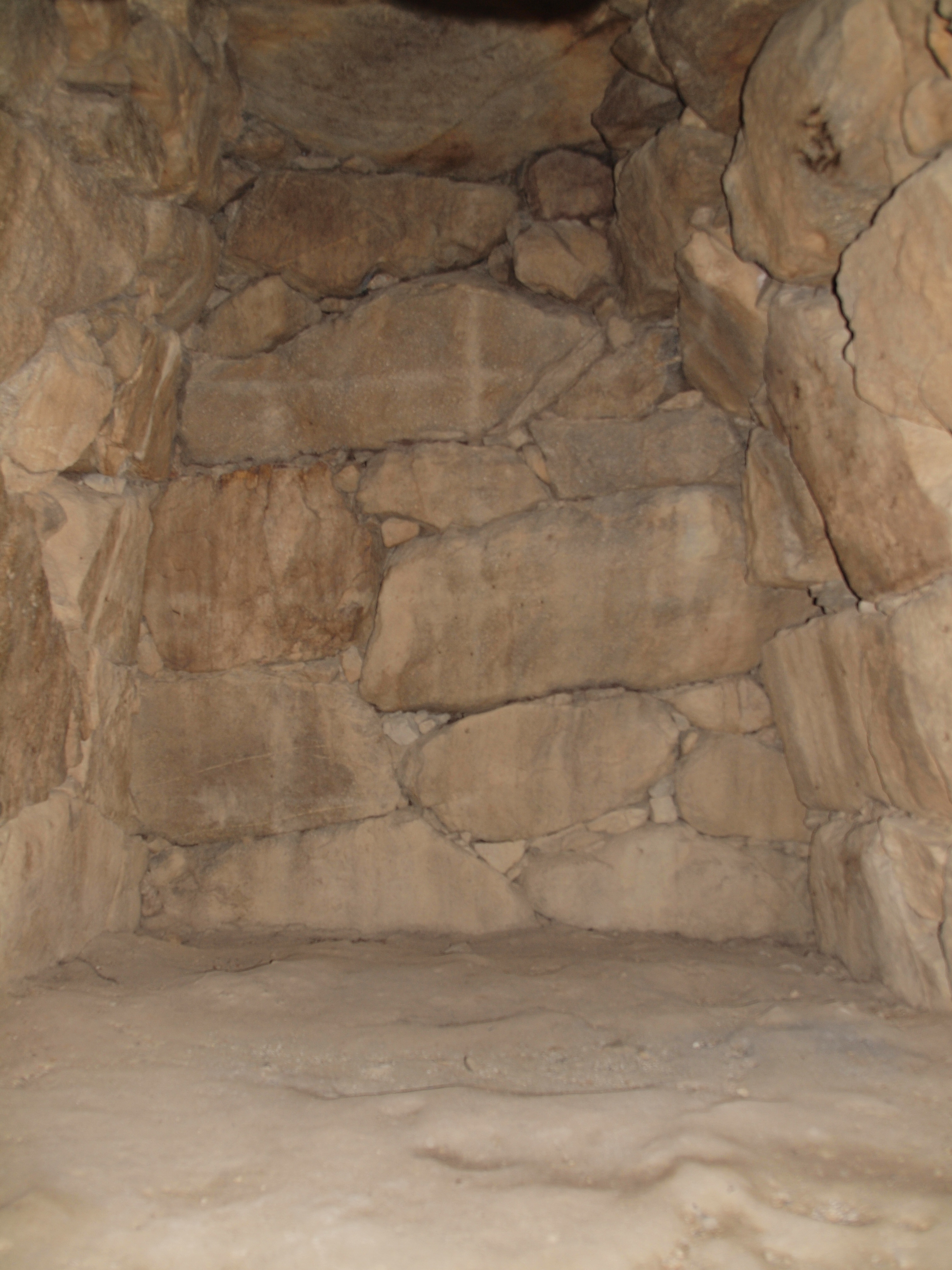
郡川Korigawa No. 1 Tumulus (Kaiyamazuka Kofun). The largest in the Takayasu cluster

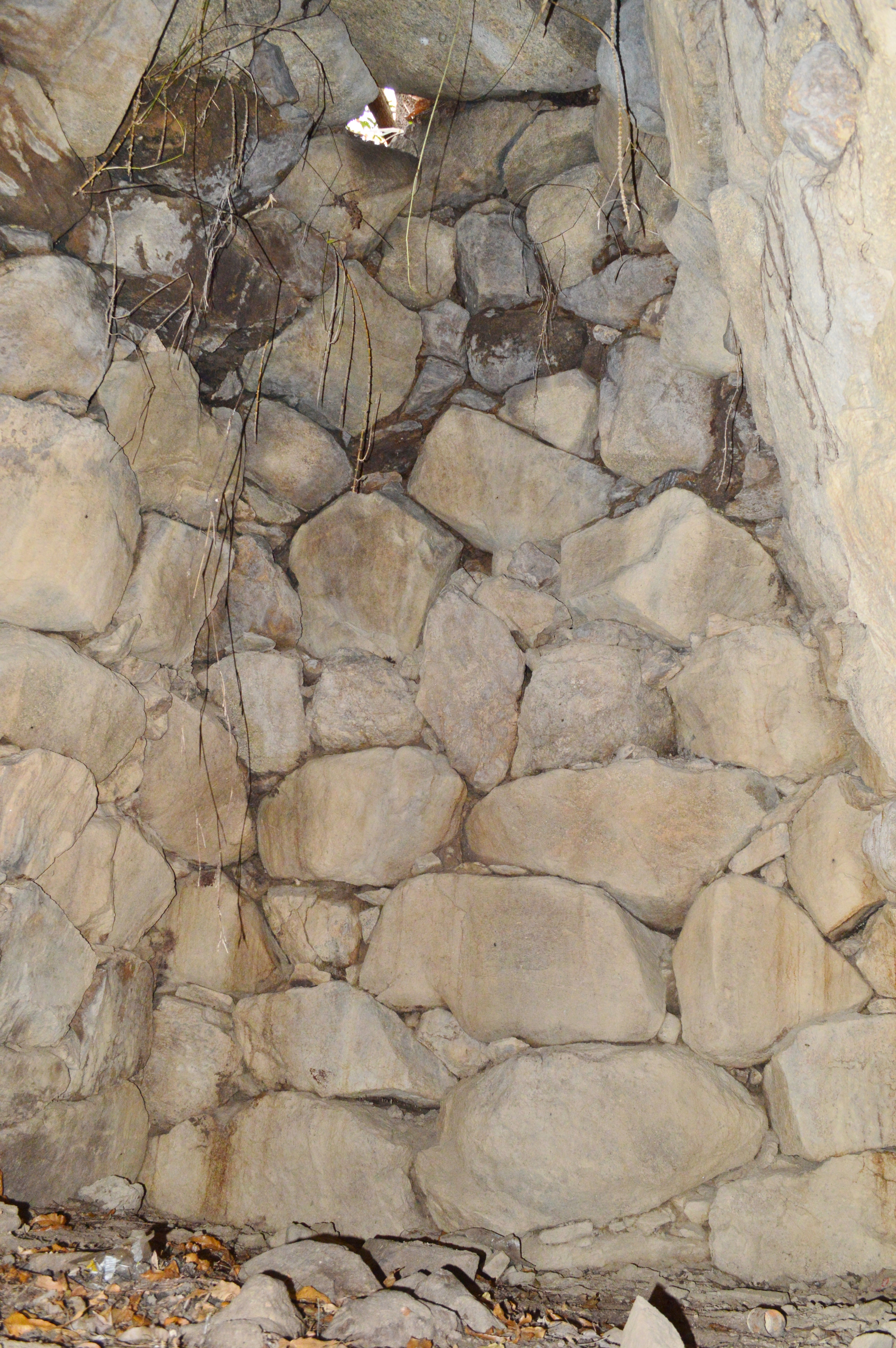
Korigawa No. 16 Tumulus, facing back wall and showing domed ceiling

== See also ==
- List of Historic Sites of Japan (Osaka)
