= Shionjiyama Kofun =

Kofun period keyhole-shaped burial mound in Japan

- 心合寺山古墳 (Japanese)
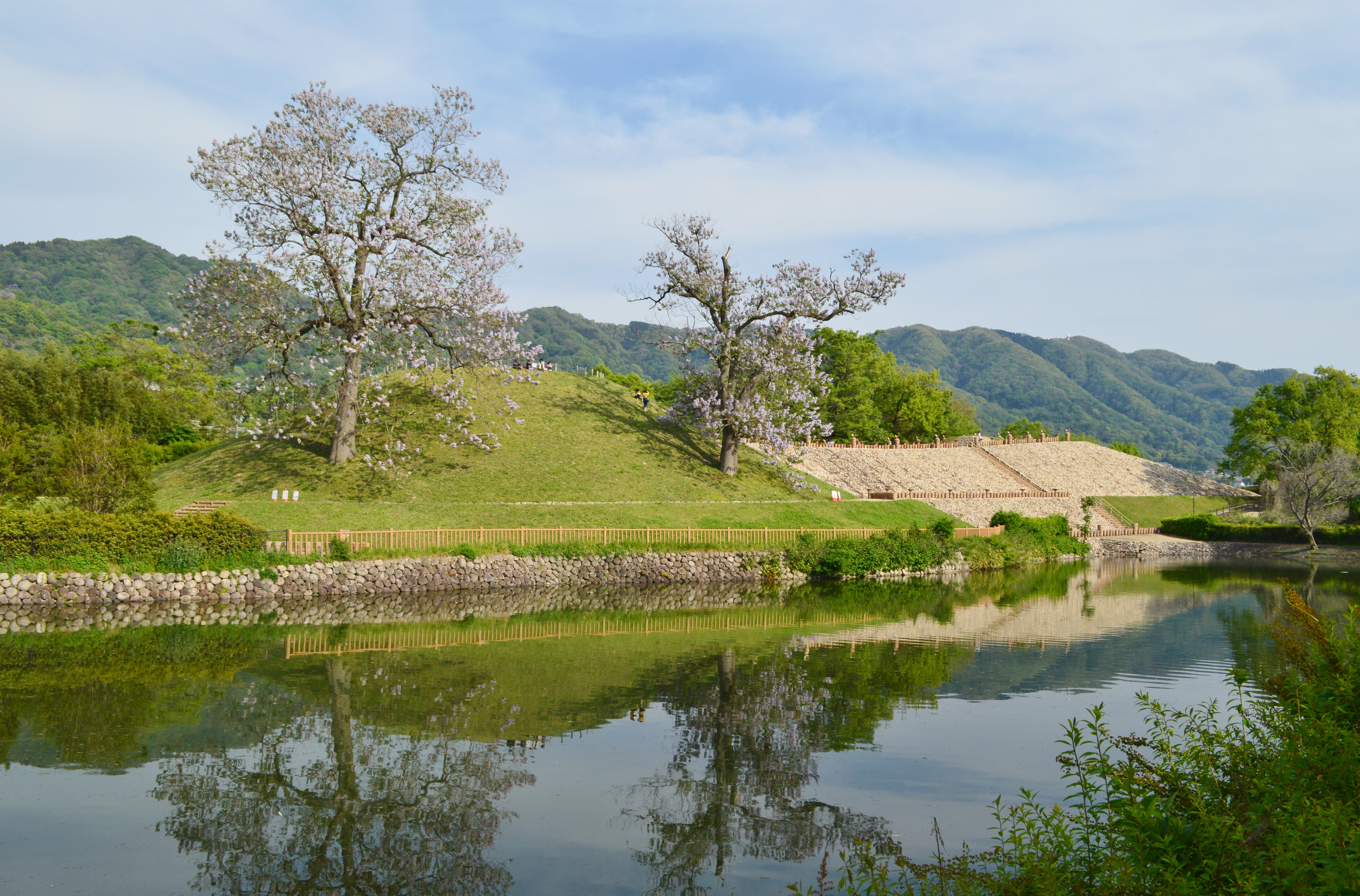
- Shionjiyama Kofun

- Shionjiyama Kofun Shionjiyama Kofun (Japan)
- Interactive map of Shionjiyama Kofun
- 34°38′20.9″N 135°38′27.15″E
- Type: Kofun
- Periods: Kofun period
- Location: Yao, Osaka, Japan
- Region: Kansai region

History
- Built: c.early 5th century

Site notes
- Public access: Yes (museum at site)

The Shionjiyama Kofun (心合寺山古墳) is a Kofun period keyhole-shaped burial mound, located in the Otake neighborhood of the city of Yao, Osaka in the Kansai region of Japan. The tumulus was designated a National Historic Site of Japan in 1966 with the area under protection expanded in 1978.

== Overview ==
The Shionjiyama Kofun is a zenpō-kōen-fun (前方後円墳), which is shaped like a keyhole, having one square end and one circular end, when viewed from above. It is located on a slope at an elevation of 30 meters, in the fan-shaped land at the western foot of the Ikoma Mountains, which runs north and south as a watershed between Yamato and Kawachi Provinces. The tumulus has a total length of 160 meters, with a 92-meter diameter posterior circular portion, and is orientated to the south. Since it was built along the contour lines of a natural slope, the surrounding moat was divided into two embankments on the south and north sides, making it a rare structure with different water levels in the east and west. It was once covered in fukiishi and had rows of over 3000 haniwa, which included figurative, pot-shaped and "morning-glory-shaped" versions as well as the more common cylindrical haniwa. There was a protrusion on the west side of the central construction, forming a ceremonial platform.

At the top of the posterior circle, there are three burial chambers of different lengths, of which the remains of a clay-covered wooden coffin was confirmed in the west side. Various burial items such as bronze mirrors, magatama, armor, iron swords, and iron spearheads were excavated from the surrounding area. Judging from these grave goods and the construction method, the tumulus was compiled in the middle Kofun period, or around the 5th century. During the Asuka period a Buddhist temple called Shingo-ji was constructed on the western side of the tumulus. The temple eventually disappeared, with its place name becoming distorted over time to become "Shinonji". The tumulus was first excavated in 1993, with further excavations occurring annually until 2003.

The tumulus and its surroundings are now maintained as an archaeological park and replicas of haniwa have been placed on the tumulus. Artifacts excavated from the tumulus are displayed at the Yao City Shionjiyama Kofun Learning Center, located next to the tumulus. The tumulus is about a five-minute walk from the "Otake" bus stop on the Kintetsu Bus from Kawachi-Yamamoto Station on the Kintetsu Osaka Line.

Total length
160 meters:
Anterior rectangular portion
90 meters wide x 12 meters high, 3-tier
Posterior circular portion
92 meter diameter x 13 meters high, 3-tiers

== Gallery ==
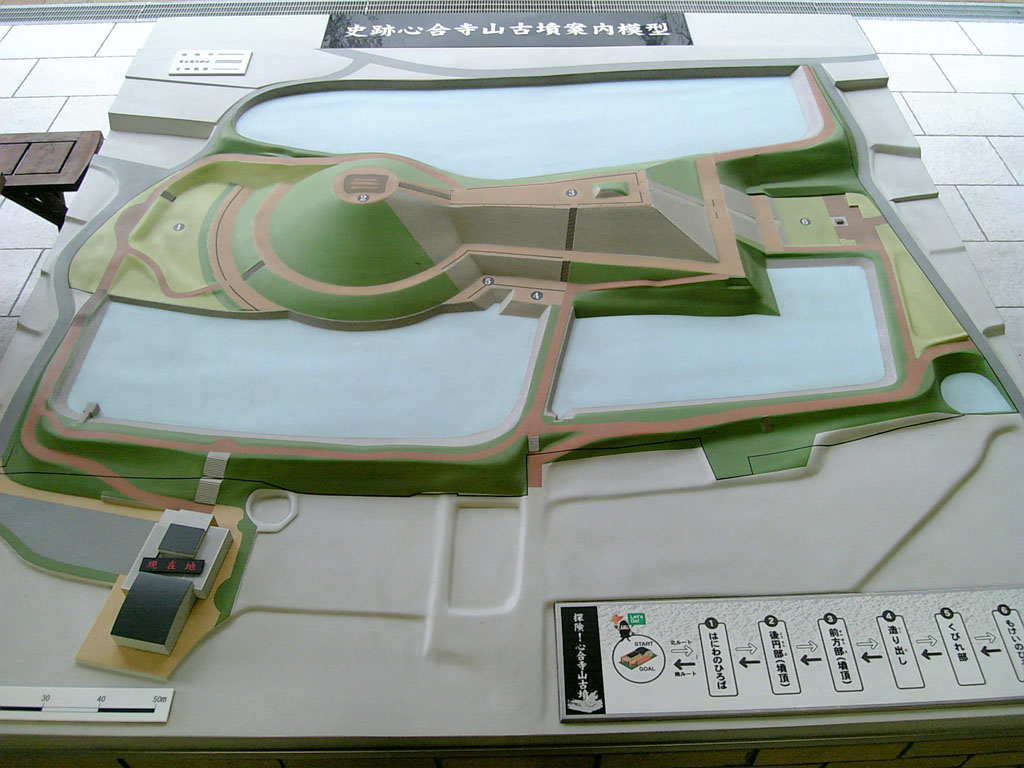
Diorama showing original appearance

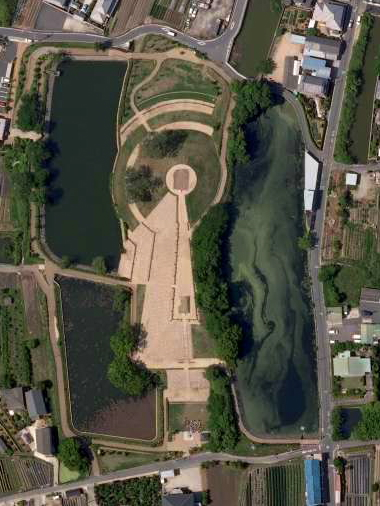
Aerial photograph taken in 1975.

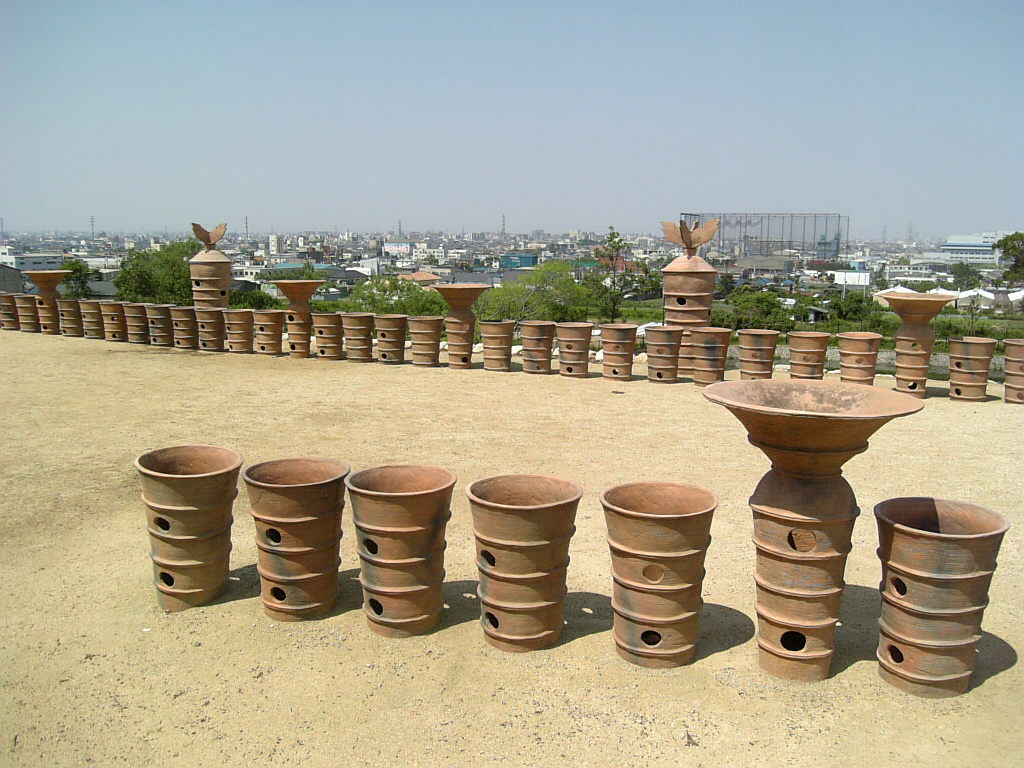
Top of the tumulus

== See also ==
- List of Historic Sites of Japan (Osaka)
