= Yao, Osaka =

Yao 八尾市
- Core city
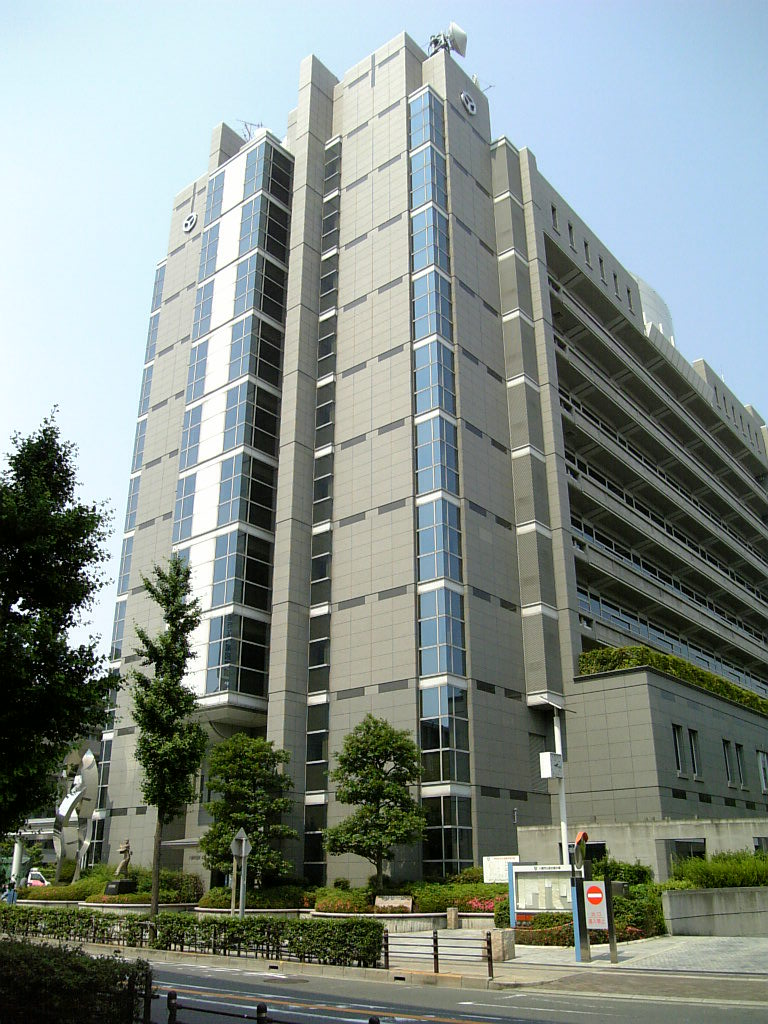
- Yao City Hall

- Flag Seal

- Location of Yao in Osaka Prefecture

- Location in Japan
- Coordinates: 34°37′36.73″N 135°36′3.55″E
- Country: Japan
- Region: Kansai
- Prefecture: Osaka

Government
  - Mayor: Keisuke Daimatsu

Area
  - Total: 41.72 km^{2} (16.11 sq mi)

Population (January 31, 2022)
  - Total: 263,436
  - Density: 6,314/km^{2} (16,350/sq mi)
- Time zone: UTC+09:00 (JST)
- City hall address: 1-1-1 Honmachi, Yao-shi, Osaka-fu 581-0003
- Climate: Cfa
- Website: Official website
- Symbols
- Flower: Chrysanthemum
- Tree: Ginkgo

Yao (八尾市, Yao-shi; Japanese pronunciation: [jä̀.ó̞(.ɕì)]) is a city located in Osaka Prefecture, Japan. As of 31 January 2022, the city had an estimated population of 263,436 in 126,509 households and a population density of 6300 persons per km^{2}. The total area of the city is 41.72 square kilometres (16.11 sq mi). The city is the birthplace of the Kawachi ondo style of folk singing.

== Geography ==
Yao is located adjacent to the central part of the Osaka Plain and southeast of Osaka metropolis. The west side of the city area is almost flat with an average elevation of only ten meters above sea level. The land rises in the east, with the Ikoma Mountains forming the prefectural border with Nara Prefecture. In addition to the Yamato River flowing at the southern end of the city, there are many small rivers.

=== Neighboring municipalities ===
Nara Prefecture

- Heguri
- Sangō

Osaka Prefecture

- Fujiidera
- Higashiōsaka
- Hirano-ku
- Kashiwara
- Matsubara

=== Climate ===
Yao has a humid subtropical climate (Köppen Cfa) characterized by warm summers and cool winters with light to no snowfall. The average annual temperature in Yao is 16.9 °C (62.4 °F). The average annual rainfall is 1,263.9 mm (49.76 in) with September as the wettest month. The temperatures are highest on average in August, at around 29.1 °C (84.4 °F), and lowest in January, at around 5.5 °C (41.9 °F).

Climate data for Yao (2003−2020 normals, extremes 2003−present)
Month	Jan	Feb	Mar	Apr	May	Jun	Jul	Aug	Sep	Oct	Nov	Dec	Year
Record high °C (°F)	18.9 (66.0)	23.8 (74.8)	26.9 (80.4)	30.4 (86.7)	32.8 (91.0)	36.0 (96.8)	38.3 (100.9)	39.1 (102.4)	37.0 (98.6)	33.0 (91.4)	28.1 (82.6)	26.1 (79.0)	38.2 (100.8)
Mean daily maximum °C (°F)	9.4 (48.9)	10.5 (50.9)	14.5 (58.1)	20.0 (68.0)	25.1 (77.2)	28.4 (83.1)	31.9 (89.4)	33.7 (92.7)	29.7 (85.5)	23.8 (74.8)	18.0 (64.4)	12.0 (53.6)	21.4 (70.5)
Daily mean °C (°F)	5.5 (41.9)	6.3 (43.3)	9.6 (49.3)	14.9 (58.8)	20.0 (68.0)	23.9 (75.0)	27.7 (81.9)	29.1 (84.4)	25.2 (77.4)	19.2 (66.6)	13.5 (56.3)	8.0 (46.4)	16.9 (62.4)
Mean daily minimum °C (°F)	1.4 (34.5)	2.0 (35.6)	4.9 (40.8)	9.8 (49.6)	15.1 (59.2)	20.0 (68.0)	24.2 (75.6)	25.3 (77.5)	21.3 (70.3)	15.0 (59.0)	9.0 (48.2)	3.8 (38.8)	12.6 (54.7)
Record low °C (°F)	−3.6 (25.5)	−4.5 (23.9)	−1.5 (29.3)	0.6 (33.1)	6.7 (44.1)	12.7 (54.9)	17.6 (63.7)	18.0 (64.4)	13.4 (56.1)	6.1 (43.0)	1.8 (35.2)	−2.7 (27.1)	−4.5 (23.9)
Average precipitation mm (inches)	47.1 (1.85)	63.9 (2.52)	99.9 (3.93)	88.2 (3.47)	117.8 (4.64)	149.0 (5.87)	169.8 (6.69)	103.1 (4.06)	137.4 (5.41)	142.1 (5.59)	71.9 (2.83)	57.1 (2.25)	1,263.9 (49.76)
Average precipitation days (≥ 1.0mm)	5.6	7.0	9.4	9.1	9.3	10.5	11.1	7.9	10.2	9.1	7.2	6.5	102.7
Source: Japan Meteorological Agency

=== Demographics ===
Per Japanese census data, the population of Yao increased rapidly from the 1960s through 1970s, and has leveled off since.

Historical population
Year	Pop.	±%
1960	92,525	—
1970	123,035	+33.0%
1980	227,778	+85.1%
1990	272,706	+19.7%
2000	274,777	+0.8%
2010	268,652	−2.2%

== History ==
=== Premodern ===
The area of the modern city of Yao was within ancient Kawachi Province and is built on land which was once Kawachi Bay. This area was a fertile delta along Old-Yamato River, and has been cultivated since Yayoi period. In the Kofun period, many powerful clans settled here and built kofun burial mounds in the foothills of the Ikoma mountain range. In Asuka period, this area was under the control of Mononobe clan. The clan was destroyed when Mononobe no Moriya was defeated by Soga no Umako. The Yuge clan, which was a cadet branch of Mononobe clan, however, kept control on the area. The monk Dōkyō, who was from Yuge clan, became the most powerful person in the late Nara period through his relationship with Empress Shōtoku. He constructed Saikyo (West Capital) called Yuge-gu in this area, from which he intended rule the nation prior to his fall from power. Takayasu Castle, an ancient castle on Mount Takayasu, was constructed for defense against Tang dynasty, after Yamato was defeated at the Battle of Baekgang in Korean Peninsula and rediscovered by archaeologists in 1978. During the Nara period, the area Yao prospered as a transportation hub between Yamato Province, Naniwa-kyō and the seacoast. During the Heian period, the area was dominated by large shōen landed estates controlled by Buddhist temples and the nobility. In the Sengoku period the area was the site of several battles, including during the summer campaign of Siege of Osaka.

Before the middle term of Edo period, the Yamato river flowed from south to north and joined to the Yodo River. However, due to flooding, the Tokugawa shogunate undertook a large public works project to change the flow of the Yamato River from east to west, to empty into Osaka Bay directly. The construction decreased number of floods, and enabled this area to develop more paddy fields. In addition, cotton cultivation flourished in this area.

=== Modern ===
After the Meiji restoration, the area became part of Osaka Prefecture. The village Yao created with the establishment of the modern municipalities system on April 1, 1889, although the name "Yao" appears as far back as Heian period documents. On April 1, 1896 the area became part of Nakakawachi District, Osaka. Yao was elevated to town status on August 1, 1903. On April 1, 1948, Yao merged with the town of Ryuge and the villages of Kyuhoji, Taisho, and Nishigo to form the city of Yao.

== Government ==
Yao has a mayor-council form of government with a directly elected mayor and a unicameral city council of 28 members. Yao contributes three members to the Osaka Prefectural Assembly. In terms of national politics, the city is part of Osaka 14th district of the lower house of the Diet of Japan.

== Education ==
- Osaka University of Economics and Law

== Transportation ==
=== Airports ===
- Yao Airport

=== Railway ===
JR West – Yamatoji Line

- Shiki - Yao - Kyūhōji

JR West – Osaka Higashi Line

- Kyūhōji

Kintetsu Railway - Kintetsu Osaka Line

- Kyūhōjiguchi - Kintetsu Yao - Kawachi-Yamamoto - Takayasu - Onji

Kintetsu Railway - Kintetsu Shigi Line

- Hattorigawa - Shigisanguchi

Kintetsu Railway - Nishi-Shigi Cable Line

- Takayasuyama

Osaka Metro - Tanimachi Line:

- Yaominami

=== Highway ===
- Kinki Expressway
- National Route 25
- National Route 170

== Notable sites ==
- Shionjiyama Kofun, National Historic Site
- Taiseishōgun-ji, Buddhist temple founded in 587 AD
- Takayasu Senzuka Kofun Cluster, National Historic Site
- Yuge-dera ruins, National Historic Site

== Sister cities ==
- Usa, Ōita, Japan
- Wake, Okayama, Japan
- Shingu, Wakayama, Japan
- Gojo, Nara, Japan
- Bellevue, Washington, United States, sister city agreement since 1969
- Jiading District, Shanghai, China, sister city agreement since 1986

== Notable people from Yao ==
- Shōgo Arai, politician, governor of Nara Prefecture
- Dōkyō, Buddhist monk
- Toyokawa Etsushi, actor
- Yasuji Hondo, baseball player
- Ryota Katayose, singer, vocalist of Generations from Exile Tribe
- Kawachiya Kikusuimaru, musician
- Masato Kitano, songwriter of Day After Tomorrow
- Masumi Kuwata, baseball player
- Ichirō Matsui, politician, mayor of Osaka City
- Takashi Miike, film director
- Masataka Nishimoto, football player for Cerezo Osaka
- Tokushichi Nomura II, businessman, founder of the Nomura zaibatsu
- Tadashi Ōishi, shogi player
- Yui Okada, singer
- Kosuke Okanishi, football player Ventforet Kofu
- Jimmy Onishi, painter and comedian
- Noboru Rokuda, manga artist
- Nagisa Sakurauchi, football player for Júbilo Iwata
- Shota Shimizu, singer
- Hitoshi Taneda, former baseball player
- Takeshi Tokuda, politician of House of Representatives
- Etsushi Toyokawa, actor
- Yuki Ueno, professional wrestler
- Shouma Yamamoto, actor
