= Osaka University of Economics and Law =

Private university in Yao, Osaka, Japan

- 大阪経済法科大学
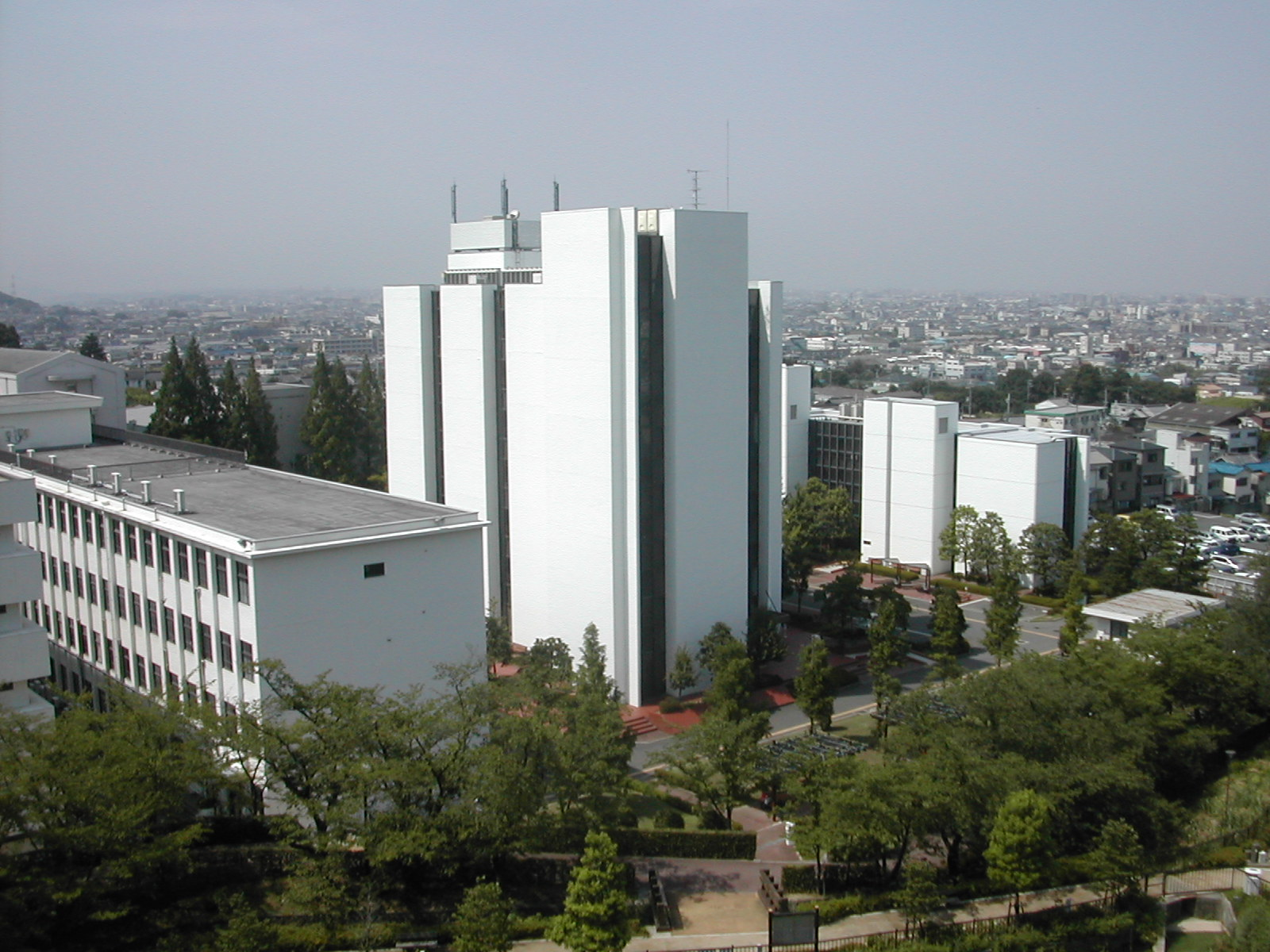
- Osaka University of Economics and Law
- Type: Private university
- Established: 1971
- Location: Yao, Osaka, Osaka Prefecture, Japan
- Campus: Hanaoka Campus 34°38′26.4″N 135°38′43.2″E Yao Eki-mae Campus 34°38′1.6″N 135°36′11″E
- Website: http://www.keiho-u.ac.jp/english/index.html

Osaka University of Economics and Law (大阪経済法科大学, Ōsaka keizai hōka daigaku) is a private university in Yao, Osaka, Japan, established in 1971.

== Organizations ==
This university has the following organizations.

=== Faculties and Departments ===
==== Faculty of Economics ====
- Department of Economics
  - Global Economy Course
  - Policy and Management Course
  - Monetary Economy Course
  - Regional Economy Course

==== Faculty of Business Administration ====
- Department of Business Administration
  - Accounting and Finance Course
  - Organization / Human Resource Management Course
  - Planning Marketing Course
  - Business Management Course

==== Faculty of Law ====
- Legal Professionals Course
- Public Officials Course
- Contemporary Society & Career Course
- International Relations Course

==== Faculty of International Studies ====
- The International Communication Course
  - The International Interchange / Public Service Model
  - The Tourism and Hospitality Model
  - The English Professional Model
- The Global Career Course
  - The Private Enterprise / International Business Management Model
  - The International Commerce Model
  - The International Cooperation Model
