= Kawachi-Kokubu Station =

Railway station in Kashiwara, Osaka Prefecture, Japan

Kawachi-Kokubu Station 河内国分駅
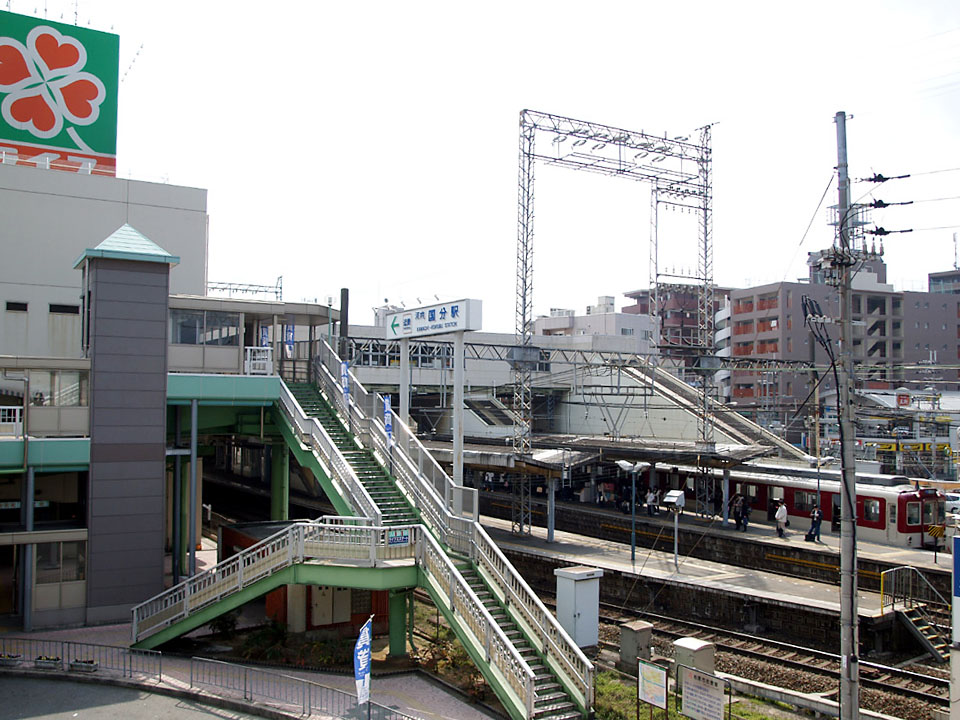

General information
- Location: 2-4, Kokubu-hommachi 1-chōme, Kashiwara, Osaka （大阪府柏原市国分本町一丁目2-4） Japan
- Coordinates: 34°34′01″N 135°38′08″E
- Operator: Kintetsu Railway
- Line: Osaka Line
- Connections: Bus stop

History
- Opened: 1927
- Former names: Kokubu (until 1941)

Passengers
- 2016: 16,512 daily
Location

Kawachi-Kokubu Station (河内国分駅, Kawachi-Kokubu-eki) is a railway station on the Kintetsu Osaka Line in Kashiwara, Osaka Prefecture, Japan.

== Layout ==
Kawachi-Kokubu Station has two island platforms serving two tracks each.

=== train time table ===
The general train of the following express stops, and semi express from Osaka direction stops at all stations from this station to Nabari station.

It is one of the train station of the Osaka line, and there are frequent train overtaking and a connection. The daytime time period is 3 Express/h, the suburban semi-Express local Express is 3/h, and the Local train is 1/h.

=== Platforms ===
1, 2	■ Osaka Line	for Goido, Yamato-Yagi, Nabari, and Ise-Nakagawa
3, 4	■ Osaka Line	for Fuse and Osaka Uehommachi

== Surroundings ==
- Japan National Route 25
- Japan National Route 165
- Kansai University of Welfare Sciences
- Kashiwara City Kokubu Elementary School
- Kashiwara City Kokubu Junior High School
- Kashiwara City Tamateyama Park
- Takaida Station (JR West Kansai Line (Yamatoji Line)) (across the Yamato River)
- Domyoji Station (Minami Osaka Line)

=== Bus ===
Kashiwara Loop Bus "Kirameki" (free, on weekdays)
for Kashiwara City Hall and Karindo-Obata

== Adjacent stations ==
«	Service	»
Osaka Line
Andō	Local	Ōsaka-Kyōikudai-mae
Andō	Suburban Semi-Express	Ōsaka-Kyōikudai-mae
Takayasu	Semi-Express	Ōsaka-Kyōikudai-mae
Fuse	Express	Goidō
Rapid Express: Does not stop at this station
