= A6 =

A6, A 6 or A-6 may refer to:

== Arts and entertainment ==
- A6, a mutated flu virus in the short story "Night Surf" by Stephen King
- A-6, a renamed version of the US Security Group in the 1997 comic book movie Spawn
- A6 (album), by Lights

== Electronics and software ==
- A6 record, a type of DNS record
- Apple A6, a System-on-a-chip ARM processor
- Hanlin eReader A6, an ebook reader
- Samsung Galaxy A6, a smartphone by Samsung

== Military ==
- A6, the designation for air force headquarters staff concerned with signals, communications, or information technology
  - In the UK, the A6 Air CIS (Computers & Information Systems) branch, also known as JFACHQ, UK Joint Force Air Component Headquarters
- A 6, a Swedish artillery regiment
- Grumman A-6 Intruder, a twin-engine, mid-wing all-weather US Navy medium attack aircraft manufactured by Grumman, in service from 1962 to 1997

== Science and technology ==
=== Biology ===
- British NVC community A6 (Ceratophyllum submersum community), a British Isles plants community
- Noradrenergic cell group A6
- Subfamily A6, a subfamily of Rhodopsin-like receptors
- Xenopus A6 kidney epithelial cells in cell culture

== Transportation ==
=== Civil aviation transport ===
==== Civilian aircraft ====
- Focke-Wulf A6, a 1930s civilian aircraft from the German Focke-Wulf company

==== Other uses in civil aviation transport ====
- Air Alps Aviation (IATA code "A6")
- United Arab Emirates aircraft registration code

=== Automobiles ===
- Arrows A6, a British racing car
- Audi A6, a German executive car
- Changhe A6, a Chinese compact sedan
- JAC Refine A6, a Chinese mid-size sedan concept
- Maserati A6, an Italian sports coupe series

=== Roads and routes ===
- A6 road, in several countries
- Route A6 (WMATA), a bus route operated by the Washington Metropolitan Area Transit Authority\

=== Watercraft ===
- A-6, formerly USS Porpoise (SS-7), a Plunger-class submarine of the US Navy
- HMS A6, a British A-class submarine of the Royal Navy

=== Other ===
- Prussian A 6, a 1913 German railbus
- A6, an aggregate series (A1 to A12) German rocket design in World War II, never implemented
- LNER Class A6, a class of 4-6-2T locomotives

== Other uses ==
- A6 (classification), an amputee sport classification
- A6 tool steel, an air-hardening SAE grade of tool steel
- A6, an ISO 216 international standard paper size (105×148 mm)
- A6, or A (musical note) above soprano C, the highest note written or acknowledged as musical in classical music
- A6 Center, since 2017 renamed Asecs, a shopping mall in Jönköping, Sweden
- ASICS, a footwear company whose name and logo resemble A6

== A06 ==
- A.06, a track title on Linkin Park Underground Linkin Park fan club compilation
- A06 (band), a Massachusetts-based rock band associated with multi-instrumentalist Casey Crescenzo
- ATC code A06 Laxatives, a subgroup of the Anatomical Therapeutic Chemical Classification System
- HMNZS Monowai (A06), a 1975 Royal New Zealand Navy hydrographic survey vessel
- Réti Opening code in the Encyclopaedia of Chess Openings

== See also ==
- 6A (disambiguation)
