= Kintetsu 6A series =

Japanese electric multiple unit train type

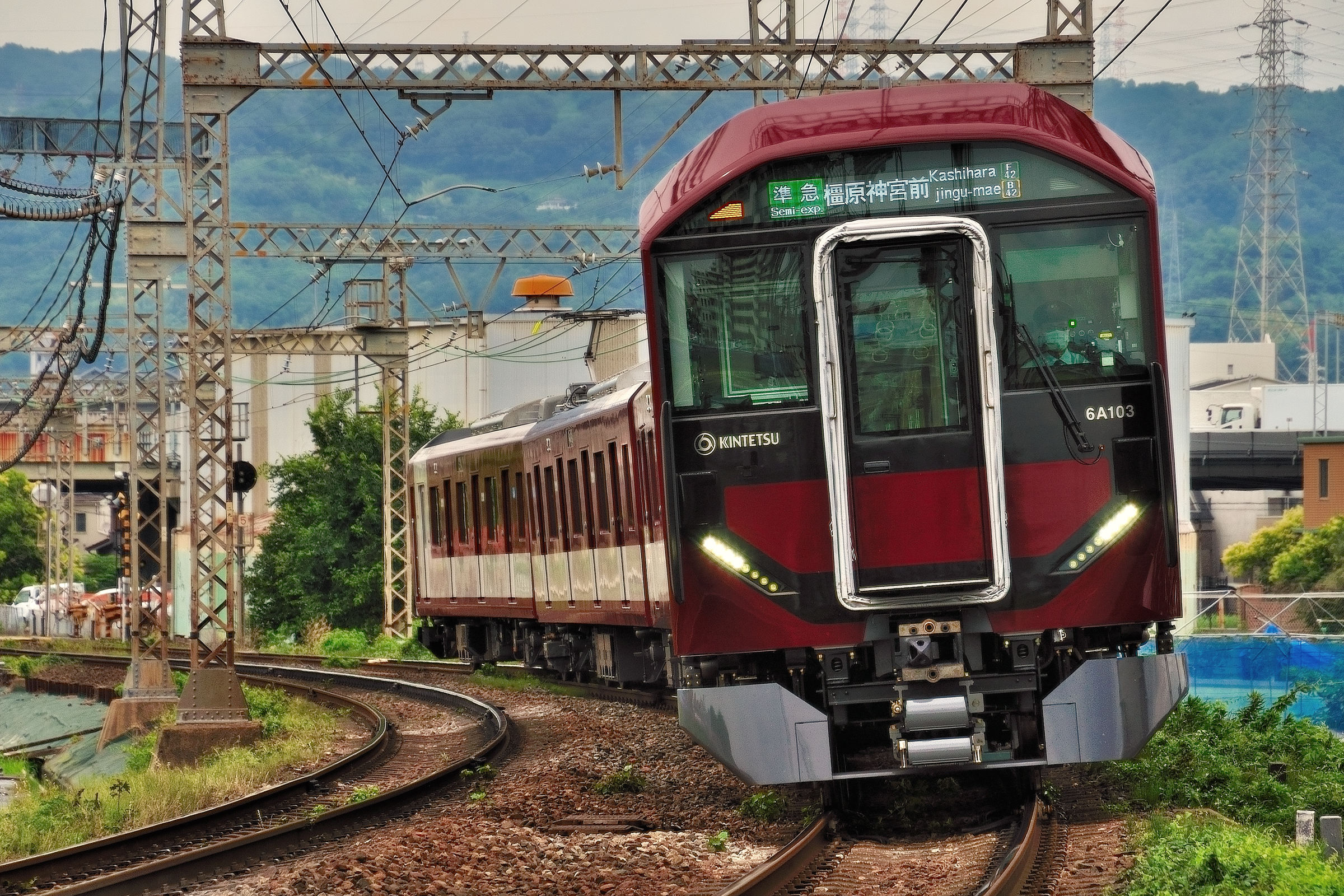
- 6A series set in June 2026
- In service: 19 May 2026 – present
- Constructed: 2026–
- Number under construction: 16 vehicles (4 sets)
- Number built: 4 vehicles (1 set)
- Formation: 4 cars per trainset
- Operator: Kintetsu Railway
- Lines served: Minami Osaka Line; Gose Line; Nagano Line; Yoshino Line

Specifications
- Track gauge: 1,067 mm (3 ft 6 in)

The Kintetsu 6A series (Japanese: 近鉄6A系, romanized: Kintetsu 6A-kei) is a commuter electric multiple unit (EMU) train type operated by the private railway operator Kintetsu Railway on the Minami Osaka Line in Japan since 2026.

== Overview ==
Details of the 6A series were first announced in June 2025. Based on the design of the 8A series introduced in 2024, the 6A series is planned for use on Kintetsu's Minami Osaka Line network. A total of five 4-car sets are planned for introduction between fiscal years 2026 and 2027. They will be the first new commuter trains on the Minami Osaka Line network since the 6820 series was introduced in 2002.

The first set was delivered in January 2026. On 20 April 2026, Kintetsu announced that it would introduce a reserved-seating service named Suwareru (すわれ～る) on the Minami Osaka and Yoshino lines from 1 June, utilizing 6A series trains. The fleet entered revenue service on 19 May 2026.

== Design ==
The 6A series will follow similar internal specifications to those of the 8A series, featuring rotating transverse seating bays and Yasashiba (やさしば, lit. 'kindness') spaces. The trains will feature onboard toilets, a first for commuter trains on the Minami Osaka Line network.

Unlike the 8A series and 1A series, the 6A series uses traction equipment supplied by Hitachi.
