= Hattorigawa Station =

Railway station in Yao, Osaka Prefecture, Japan

Hattorigawa Station 服部川駅
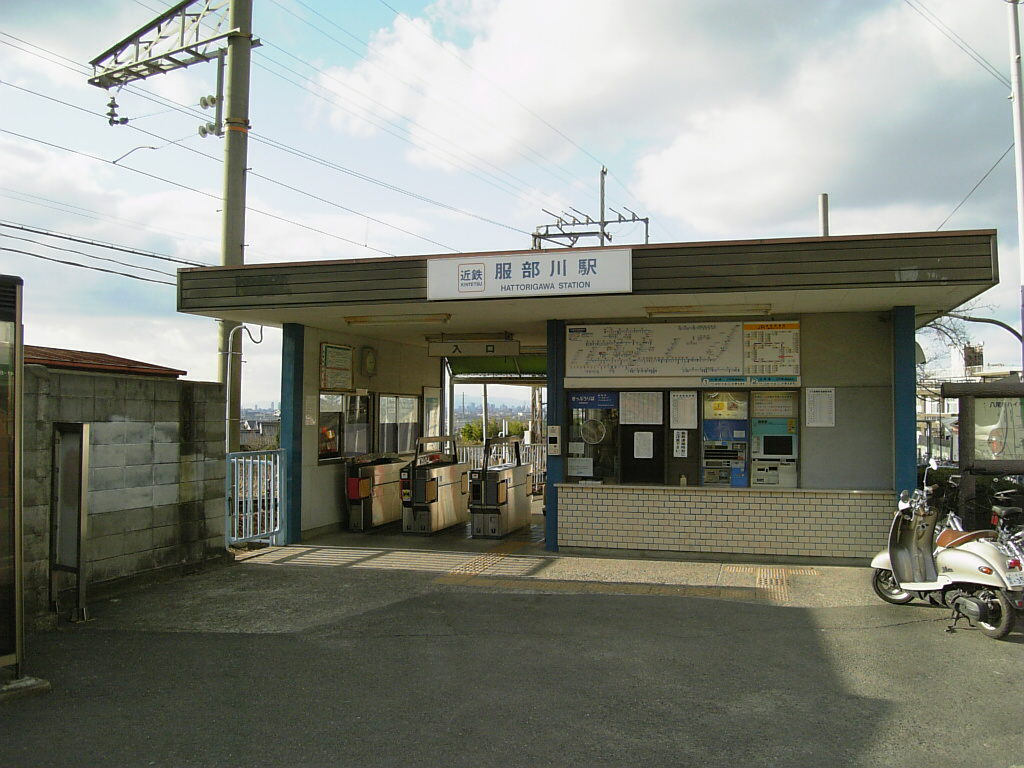
- Hattorigawa Station, January 2007

General information
- Location: 7-258 Hattorigawa, Yao-shi, Osaka-fu 581-0865; Japan
- Coordinates: 34.6264°N 135.6409°E
- Operator: Kintetsu Railway
- Line: Osaka Line
- Distance: 2.0 km from Kawachi-Yamamoto
- Platforms: 1 side platform
- Connections

Other information
- Station code: J13
- Website: Official website

History
- Opened: December 15, 1930

Passengers
- FY2018: 2043 daily
Location
- Location within Osaka Prefecture Location within Japan

Hattorigawa Station (服部川駅, Hattorigawa-eki) is a passenger railway station in located in the city of Yao, Osaka Prefecture, Japan, operated by the private railway operator Kintetsu Railway.

== Lines ==
Hattorigawa Station is served by the Shigi Line, and is located 2.0 rail kilometers from the starting point of the line at Kawachi-Yamamoto Station.

== Station layout ==
The station consists of a single ground-level side platform serving one bi-directional track.

== Adjacent stations ==
«	Service	»
Kintetsu Shigi Line
Kawachi-Yamamoto	-	Shigisanguchi

== History ==
Hattorigawa Station opened on December 15, 1930.

== Passenger statistics ==
In fiscal 2018, the station was used by an average of 2043 passengers daily.

== Surrounding area ==
- Yao Municipal Takayasu Elementary School / Yao Municipal Takayasu Junior High School

== See also ==
- List of railway stations in Japan
