= Shigisanguchi Station =

Railway and funicular station in Yao, Osaka Prefecture, Japan

Shigisanguchi Station 信貴山口駅
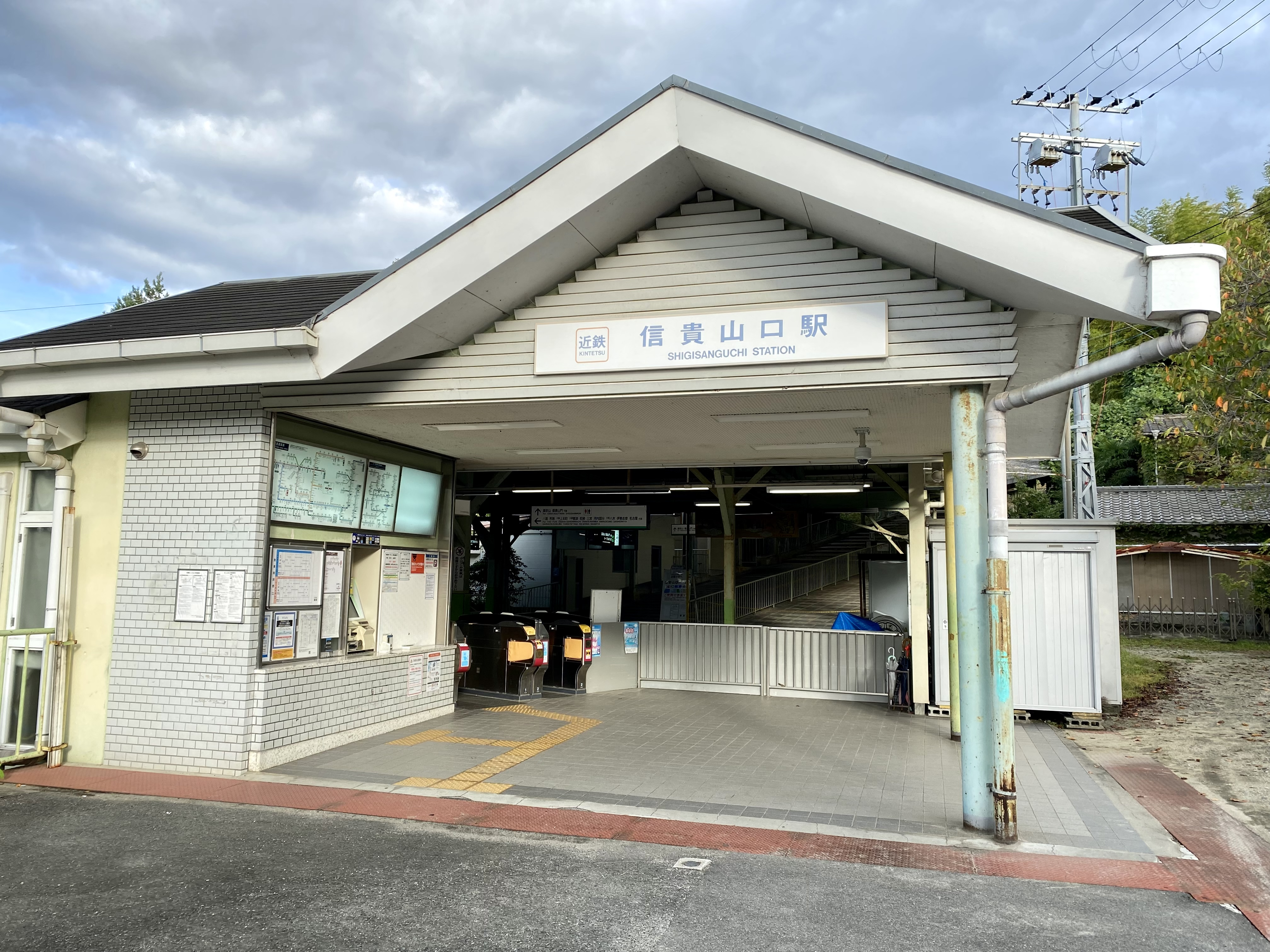
- Shigisanguchi Station in October 2022

General information
- Location: 6-154, Kurodani, Yao-shi, Osaka-fu 581-0873; Japan
- Coordinates: 34.6194°N 135.6418°E
- Operator: Kintetsu Railway
- Lines: Shigi Line; Nishi-Shigi Cable Line
- Platforms: 2 side + 1 bay platform
- Connections

Other information
- Station code: J14 (Shigi Line); Z14 (Nishi-Shigi Cable Line)
- Website: Official website

History
- Opened: December 15, 1930
- Former names: Higashi-Takayasu (until 1957)

Passengers
- FY2018: 1380 daily

Services
Preceding station	Kintetsu Railway	Following station
Hattorigawa towards Kawachi-Yamamoto	Shigi Line	Terminus
Terminus	Nishi-Shigi Cable Line	Takayasuyama Terminus
Location
- Location within Osaka Prefecture Location within Japan

Shigisanguchi Station (信貴山口駅, Shigisanguchi-eki) is an interchange passenger railway station in located in the city of Yao, Osaka Prefecture, Japan, operated by the private railway operator Kintetsu Railway.

== Lines ==
Shigisanguchi Station is served by the Shigi Line, and is located 2.8 rail kilometers from the starting point of the line at Kawachi-Yamamoto Station. It is also the terminus for the Nishi-Shigi Cable Line.

== Station layout ==
The station consists of two deadheaded opposed side platforms for the Shigi Line and one bay platform for the Nishi-Shigi Cable Line.

=== Platforms ===
1	■ Shigi Line	for Kawachi-Yamamoto
2	■ Shigi Line	for Kawachi-Yamamoto

== History ==
Shigisanguchi Station opened on December 15, 1930. It was renamed Higashi-Takayasu Station (東高安駅) from July 1, 1948 to March 21, 1957.

== Passenger statistics ==
In fiscal 2018, the station was used by an average of 1380 passengers daily.

== Surrounding area ==
The area around the station is a quiet residential area.

== See also ==
- List of railway stations in Japan
