= 6A (disambiguation) =

6A refers to Six Apart, a software company.

6A may also refer to:

- 6A (Long Island bus)
- APP-6A, the NATO standard for military map marking symbols
- Franklin 6A, an engine powering the 1961 Maule M-4 aircraft
- Gemini 6A, a 1965 crewed spaceflight
- HCM-6A, a galaxy found in 2002
- Keratin 6A
  - Precorrin-6A synthase (deacetylating), an enzyme
  - Precorrin-6A reductase, an enzyme
- Kintetsu 6A series, a Japanese electric multiple unit train type
- U.S. Route 6A
- Aviacsa IATA airline designator
- 6A, the production code for the 1982 Doctor Who serial Black Orchid

== See also ==
- A6 (disambiguation)
