= Takayasuyama Station =

Funicular station in Yao, Osaka Prefecture, Japan

Takayasuyama Station 高安山駅
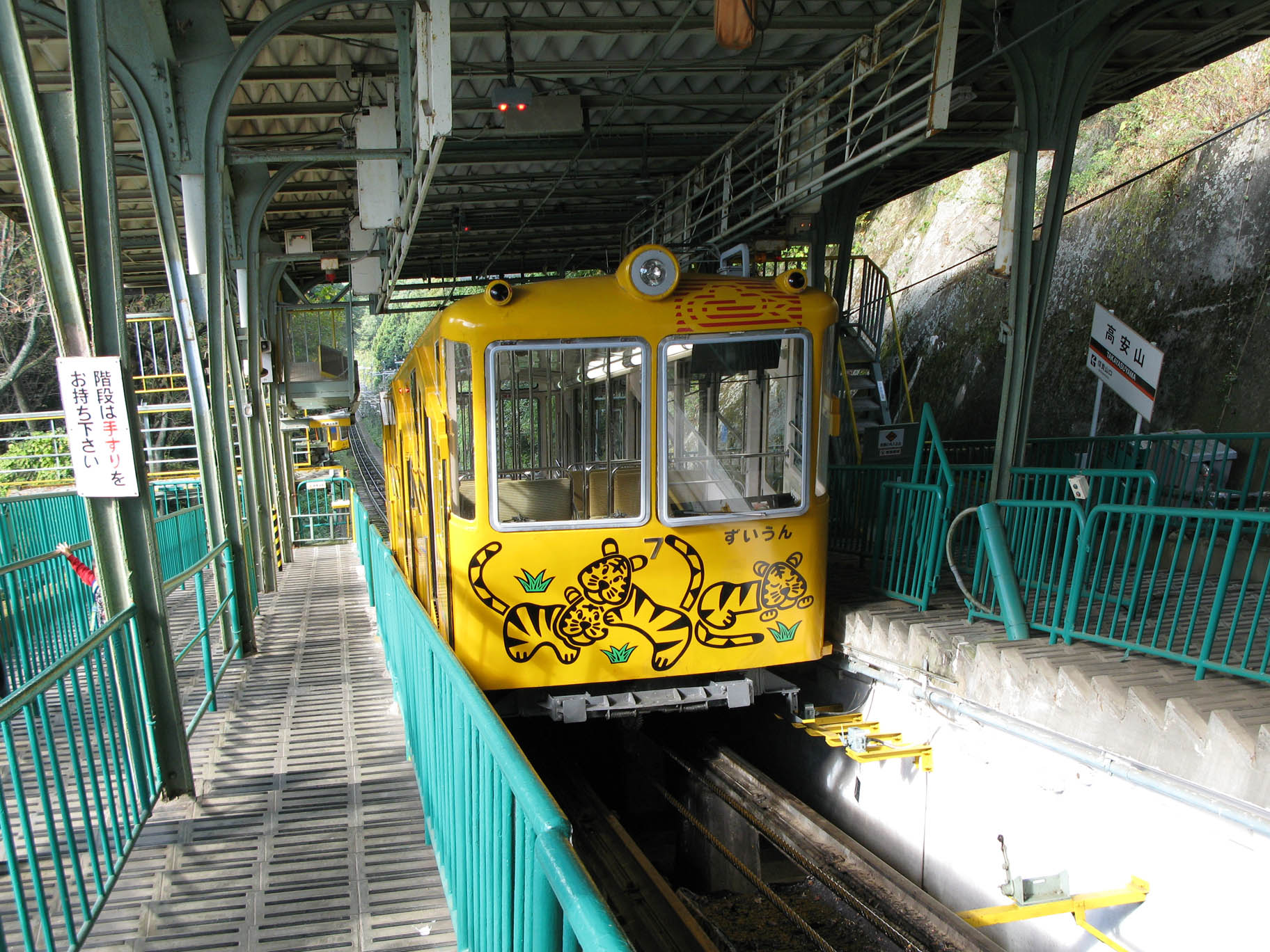
- Takayasuyama Station

General information
- Location: 729-1, Kōrigawa, Yao, Osaka （大阪府八尾市郡川729-1） Japan
- Coordinates: 34°36′49.73″N 135°39′13.69″E
- Operator: Kintetsu Railway
- Line: Nishi-Shigi Cable Line

Other information
- Station code: Z15

History
- Opened: 1927
Location

Takayasuyama Station (高安山駅, Takayasuyama-eki) is a train station in Yao, Osaka Prefecture, Japan.

== Lines ==
- Kintetsu Railway
  - ■ Nishi-Shigi Cable Line (Z15)

== Adjacent stations ==
«	Service	»
Kintetsu Nishi-Shigi Cable Line (Z15)
Shigisanguchi (Z14)	-	Terminus
