= Kawachi-Yamamoto Station =

Railway station in Yao, Osaka Prefecture, Japan

Kawachi-Yamamoto Station 河内山本駅
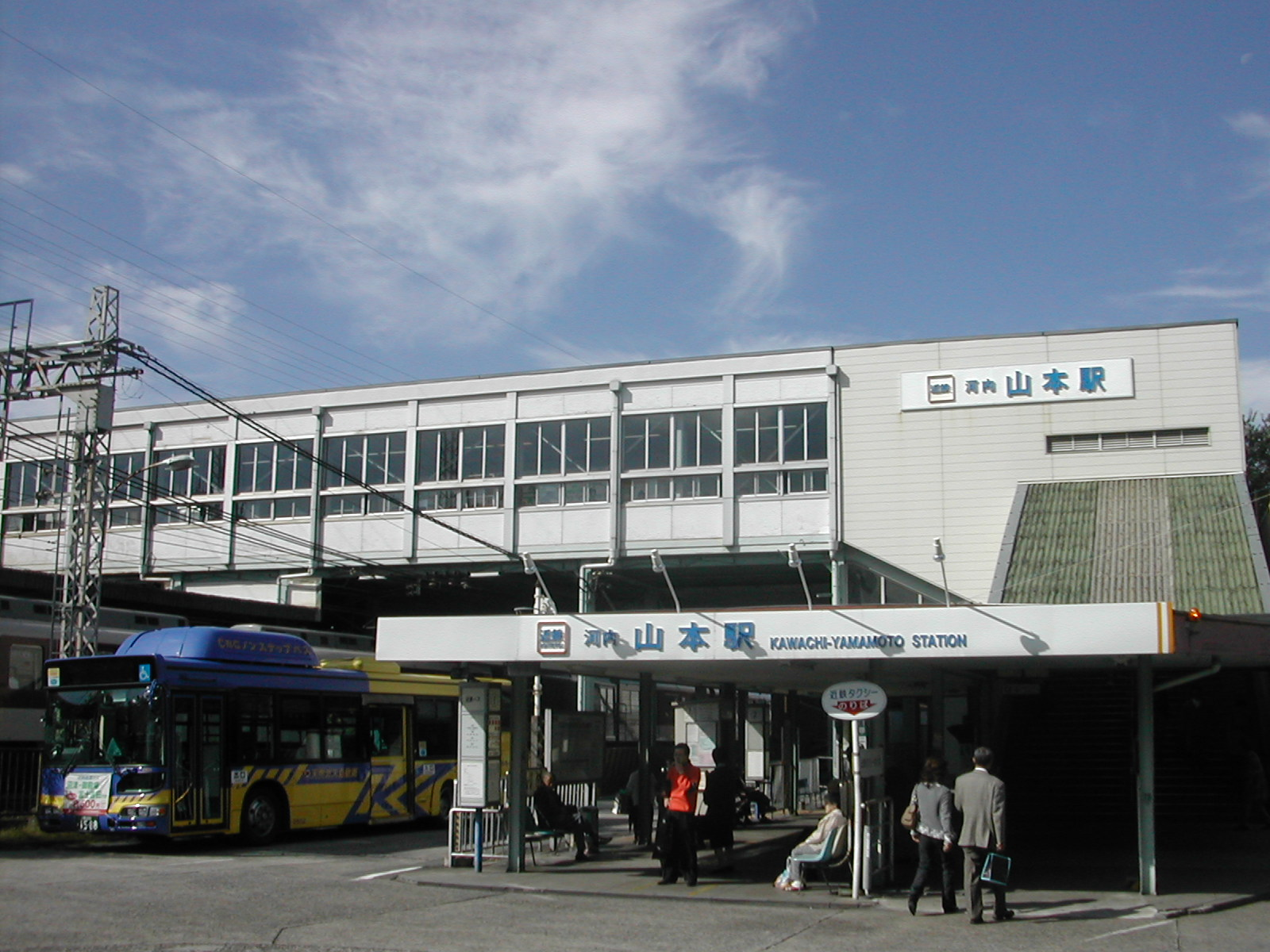
- Kawachi-Yamamoto Station entrance, October 2005

General information
- Location: 1-1-17, Yamamotochō, Yao-shi, Osaka-fu 581-0867; Japan
- Coordinates: 34°37′40.64″N 135°37′10.64″E
- Operator: Kintetsu Railway
- Lines: Osaka Line; Shigi Line
- Distance: 11.1 km from Ōsaka Uehommachi
- Platforms: 2 island platforms
- Connections: Bus terminal

Other information
- Station code: D12 (Osaka Line); J12 (Shigi Line)
- Website: Official website

History
- Opened: September 30, 1925
- Former names: Daiki Yamamoto (until 1941)

Passengers
- FY2018: 20,281 daily

Services
Preceding station	Kintetsu Railway	Following station
Kintetsu Yao towards Osaka Uehommachi	Osaka Line Local Semi-Express Suburban Semi-Express	Takayasu towards Ise-Nakagawa
Terminus	Shigi Line	Hattorigawa towards Shigisanguchi
Location
- Location within Osaka Prefecture Location within Japan

Track Layout

Kawachi-Yamamoto Station (河内山本駅, Kawachi-Yamamoto-eki) is an interchange passenger railway station located in the city of Yao, Osaka Prefecture, Japan, operated by the private railway operator Kintetsu Railway.

== Lines ==
Kawachi-Yamamoto Station is served by the Osaka Line, and is located 11.1 rail kilometers from the starting point of the line at Ōsaka Uehommachi Station. It is also the terminus of the 2.8 kilometer Shiki Line to Shigisanguchi Station.

== Station layout ==
The station consists of two elevated opposed side platforms with the station building underneath. The ticket gate is only one place. The length of the platform is 6 cars (120 meters).

== Layout ==
Kawachi-Yamamoto Station has a side platform serving Track 5 in the north, and two island platforms serving Tracks 1, 2, 3 and 4 in the south, all connected by an elevated station building.

=== Platforms ===
5	■ Shigi Line	for Shigisanguchi
1	■ Osaka Line	for Kawachi-Kokubu, Yamato-Yagi and Nabari
1	■ Shigi Line	for Shigisanguchi
2	■ Osaka Line	for Kawachi-Kokubu, Yamato-Yagi and Nabari
3	■ Osaka Line	for Fuse and Osaka Uehommachi
4	■ Osaka Line	for Fuse and Osaka Uehommachi

== History ==
Kawachi-Yamamoto Station opened on September 30, 1925, as Yamamoto Station (山本駅, Yamamoto-eki). It was renamed in December 1932 to Daiki Yamamoto Station (大軌山本駅, Daiki Yamamoto-eki), and to its present name on March 15, 1941.

== Passenger statistics ==
In fiscal 2018, the station was used by an average of 20,281 passengers daily.

== Surrounding area ==
North side
- Yao City Yamamoto Office, Yamamoto Library, Yamamoto Community Center
- Yamamoto Hachimangu
- Osaka University of Economics and Law Yamamoto House (school bus stop)
South side
- Tamakushi River

=== Buses ===
Yamamoto-ekimae (Kintetsu Bus Co., Ltd.)
- Bus stop 1 (Yamamoto Route)
  - Route 90 for Hanazono-ekimae via Aobacho and Tamakushi
  - Route 91 for Tamakushi via Aobacho
  - Route 92 for Takasago Housing via Aobacho
- Bus stop 3
  - Route 20 (Onji Route) for Hyotan-yama-ekimae via Kamiocho and Gakuonji

== See also ==
- List of railway stations in Japan
