= Kintetsu 80000 series =

Japanese train type

Kintetsu 80000 series Hinotori
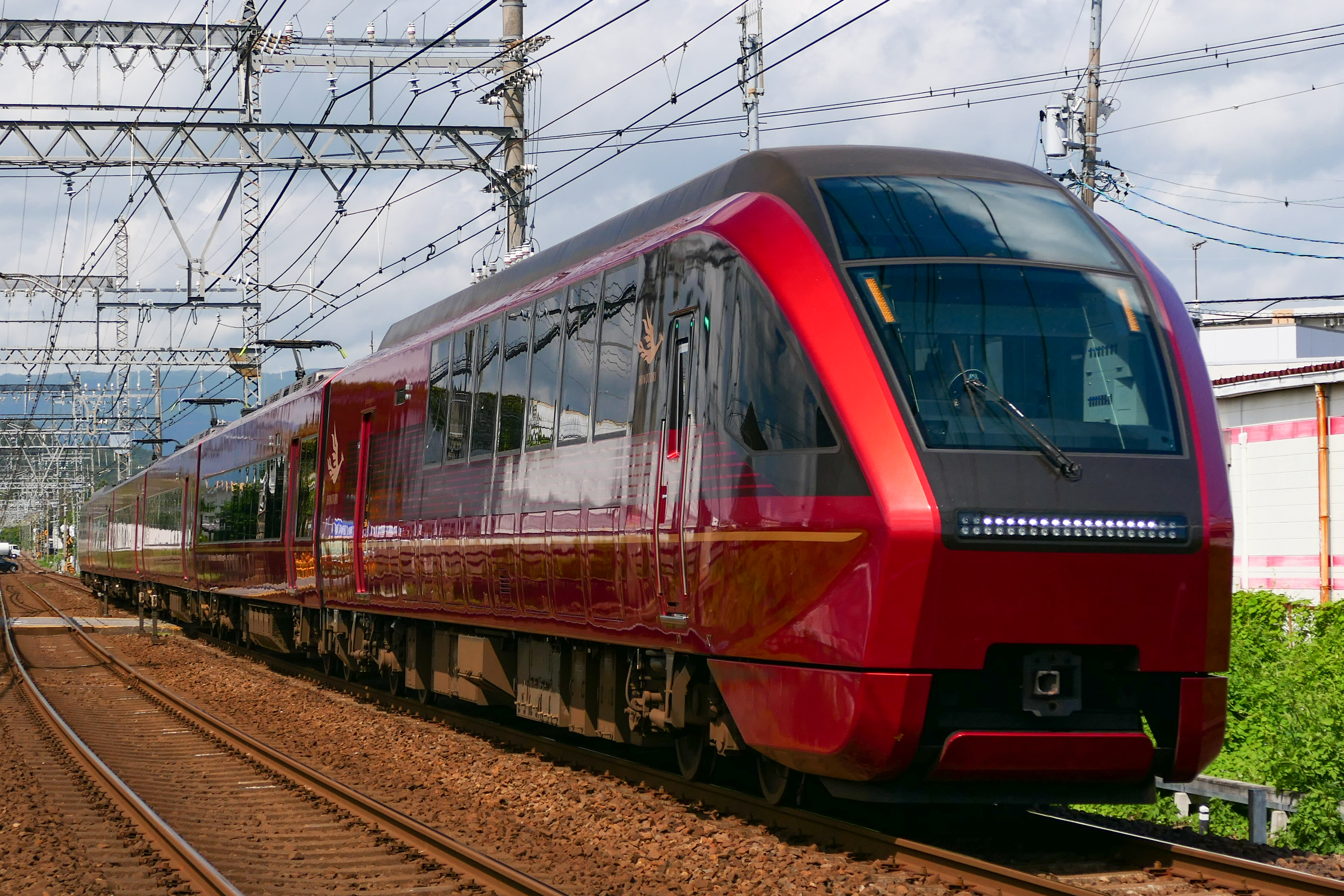
- An 80000 series train in September 2023
- In service: 2020–present
- Manufacturer: Kinki Sharyo
- Replaced: 12200 series
- Constructed: 2019–2021
- Entered service: 14 March 2020
- Number built: 72 vehicles (11 sets)
- Formation: 6 & 8 cars per trainset
- Fleet numbers: HV01 – HV04, HV11 – HV13, HV51 – HV52
- Operators: Kintetsu Railway

Specifications
- Car body construction: Steel
- Car length: 20,000 mm (65 ft 7 in)
- Traction system: 2-level PWM variable-frequency (using IGBT/SiC hybrid module)
- Electric system(s): 1,500 V DC, overhead line
- Current collector(s): Pantograph
- Track gauge: 1,435 mm (4 ft 8 1/2 in)

Notes/references
- This train won the 64th Blue Ribbon Award in 2021.

The Kintetsu 80000 series (近鉄80000系) is an electric multiple unit (EMU) train type operated by Kintetsu Railway for use on limited express/intercity services in Japan. The trains, branded Hinotori, entered service on March 14, 2020.

== Specifications ==
=== Consist ===
The fleet consists of eight six-car sets and three eight-car sets.

The metallic black and red exterior was chosen to complement each of Japan's seasons, with a "sleek, futuristic design [that] suggests speed". The name Hinotori means phoenix or firebird.

=== Technical specifications ===
The end cars are equipped with active suspension.

=== Interior ===
The premium cars have 1+2 seating, and the regular cars have a 2+2 seating layout. Seat pitch for the premium cars is 1,300 mm (51 in), and 1,160 mm (46 in) for the regular cars. The trains also have a wheelchair space and smoking compartment.

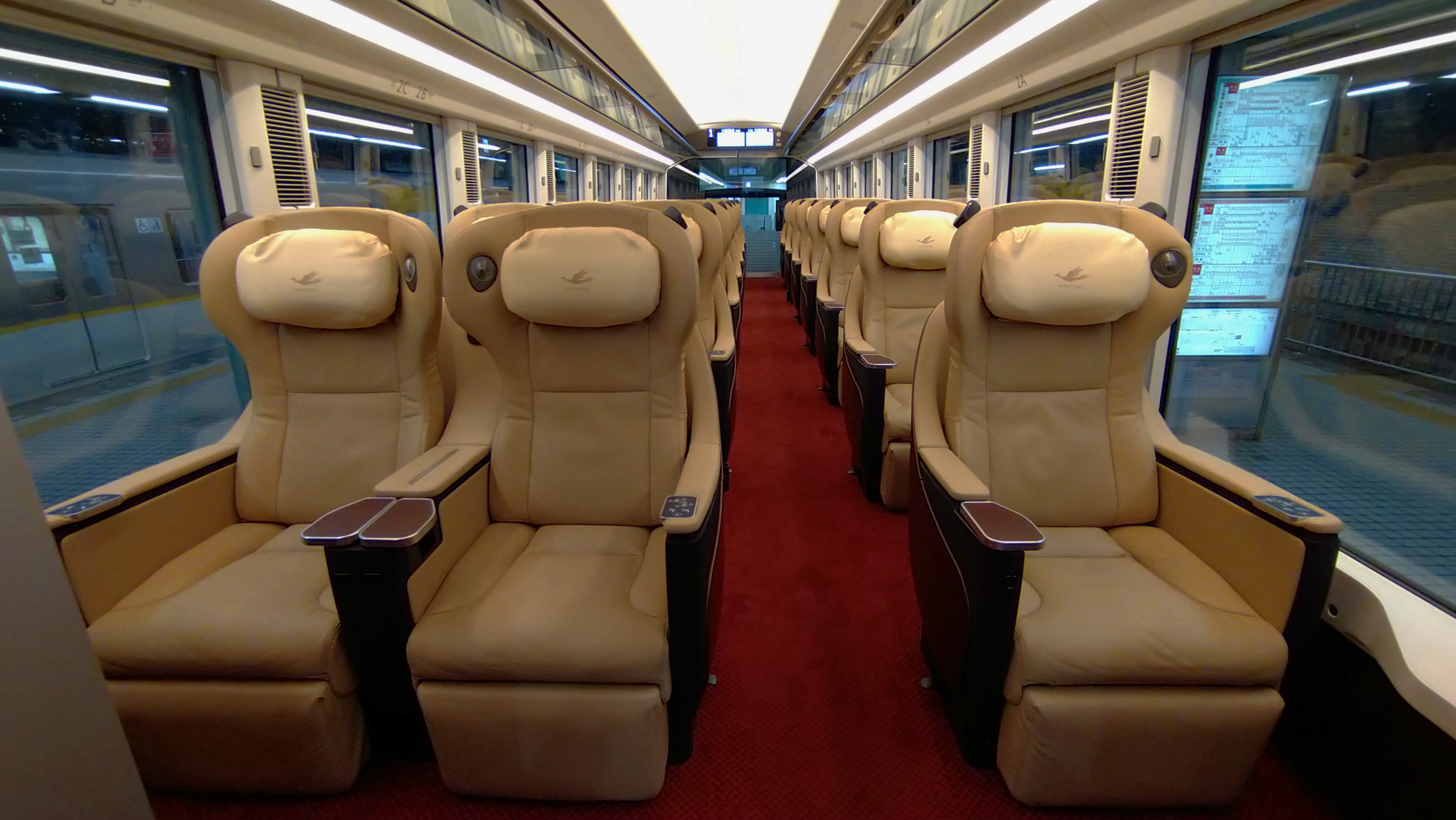
Premium car interior

Regular car interior

=== Design ===
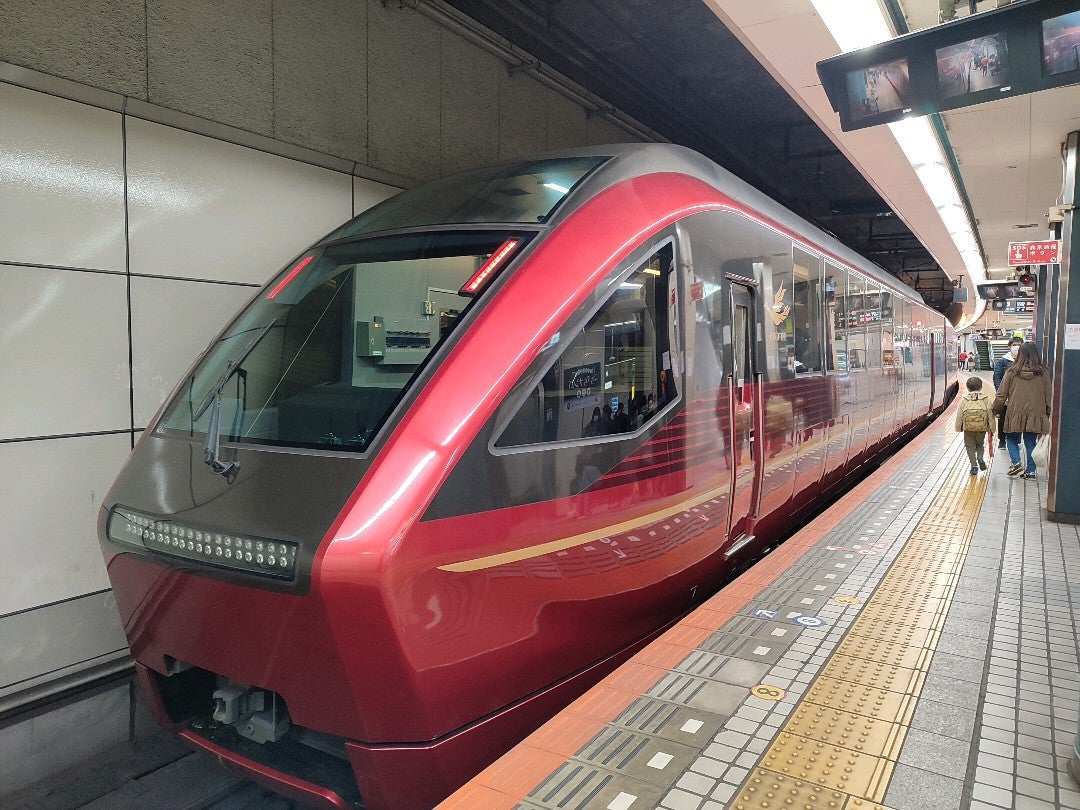
At Osaka-Namba Station in April 2022

Car interiors and exteriors were designed by GK Design Group of Tokyo. Given the service life of an average train in the country from 30-50 years, the firm tried to avoid design trends and create something that would still be stylish over this extended period with "dignity and elegance". The slanted nose is to suggest that the train is pushing forward, with the underside slanting back to emphasize this. Car interiors were designed with a sense of "upgraded relaxation" and excitement, as one would feel going to a resort. The deep metallic red car exteriors were the result of much discussion with the paint manufacturer.

== History ==
A total of 72 cars are to be introduced in fiscal 2020. Delivery by road began in October 2019.

Three six-car sets entered service on March 14, 2020.

The train type was awarded the Blue Ribbon Award by the Japan Railfan Club on May 26, 2021, representing the best new train in Japan from the previous year. 3508 votes were cast, with the train receiving 1056 votes from the Club's members to win the award.
