= Shigi Line =

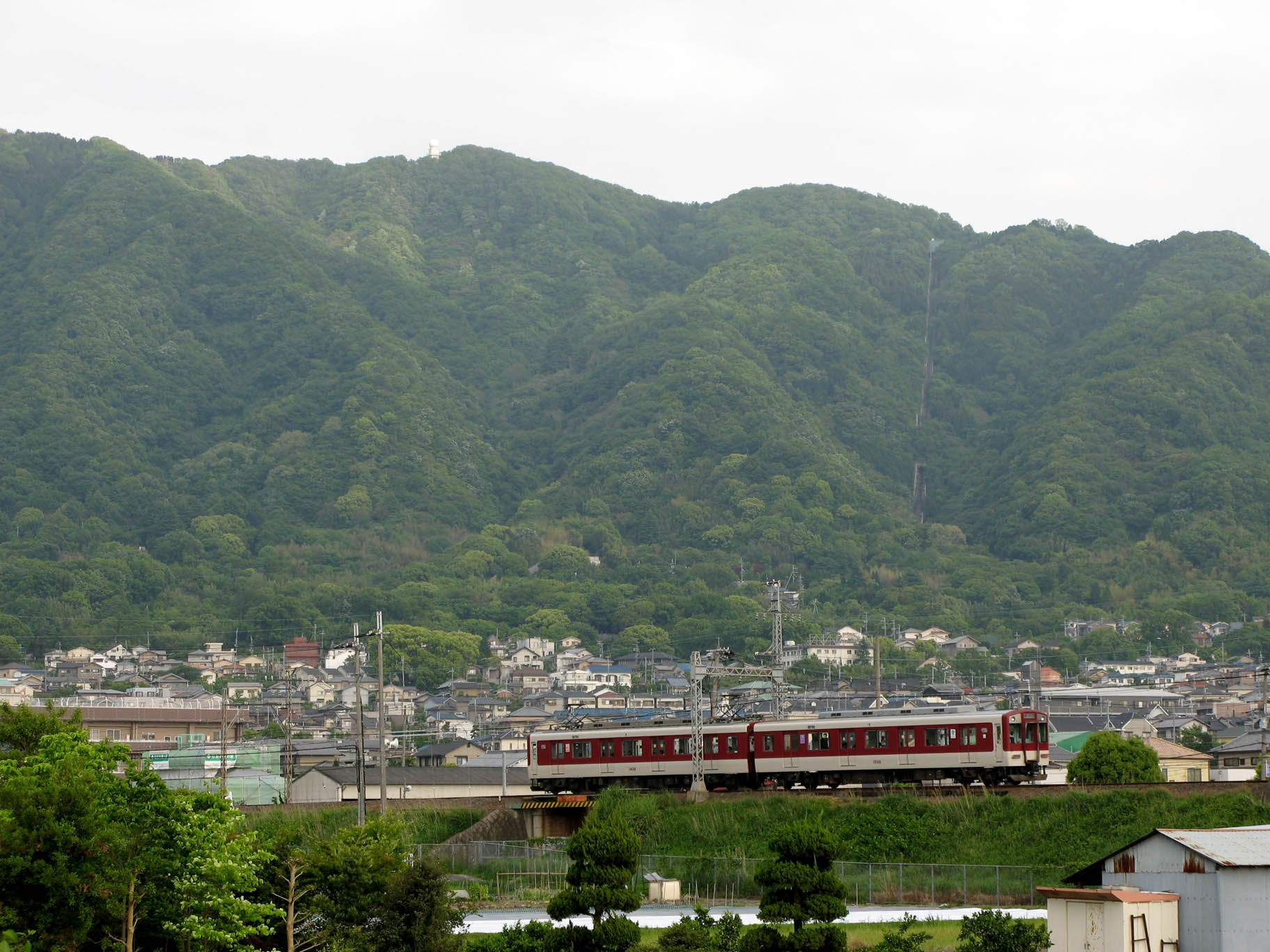
- A Shigi Line train between Kawachi-Yamamoto and Hattorigawa in May 2007

Overview
- Native name: 信貴線
- Owner: Kintetsu Railway
- Line number: J
- Locale: Yao, Osaka, Japan
- Termini: Kawachi-Yamamoto; Shigisanguchi
- Stations: 3
- Color on map: (#2e89d9)

Service
- Type: Commuter rail
- System: Kintetsu Railway
- Operator(s): Kintetsu Railway
- Depot(s): Takayasu

History
- Opened: 15 December 1930; 95 years ago

Technical
- Track length: 2.8 km (1.7 mi)
- Number of tracks: Single-track
- Track gauge: 1,435 mm (4 ft 8 1/2 in) standard gauge
- Minimum radius: 161 m (528 ft)
- Electrification: 1,500 V DC (overhead lines)
- Operating speed: 65 km/h (40 mph)

The Shigi Line (信貴線, Shigi-sen) is a railway line in Japan operated by the private railway operator Kintetsu Railway.

== Location ==
The line connects Kawachi-Yamamoto Station and Shigisanguchi Station. The entire line is located in the city of Yao, and is 2.8 km (1.7 mi) long. At Kawachi-Yamamoto, the line connects to the Osaka Line, and at Shigisanguchi, to the Nishi-Shigi Cable Line. The line opened in 1930, and has a ruling gradient of 40.0‰.

== Stations ==
No.	Station	Japanese	Distance (km)	Transfers	Location
J12	Kawachi-Yamamoto	河内山本	0.0	D Osaka Line (D12)	Yao, Osaka
J13	Hattorigawa	服部川	2.0		Yao, Osaka
J14	Shigisanguchi	信貴山口	2.8	Z Nishi-Shigi Cable Line (Z14)	Yao, Osaka

== History ==
The line opened on 15 December 1930.
