= Nishi-Shigi Cable Line =

Cable railway in Osaka Prefecture, Japan

Coordinates: 34°37′4″N 135°38′54″E

Nishi-Shigi Cable Line (Nishi-Shigi Cable)

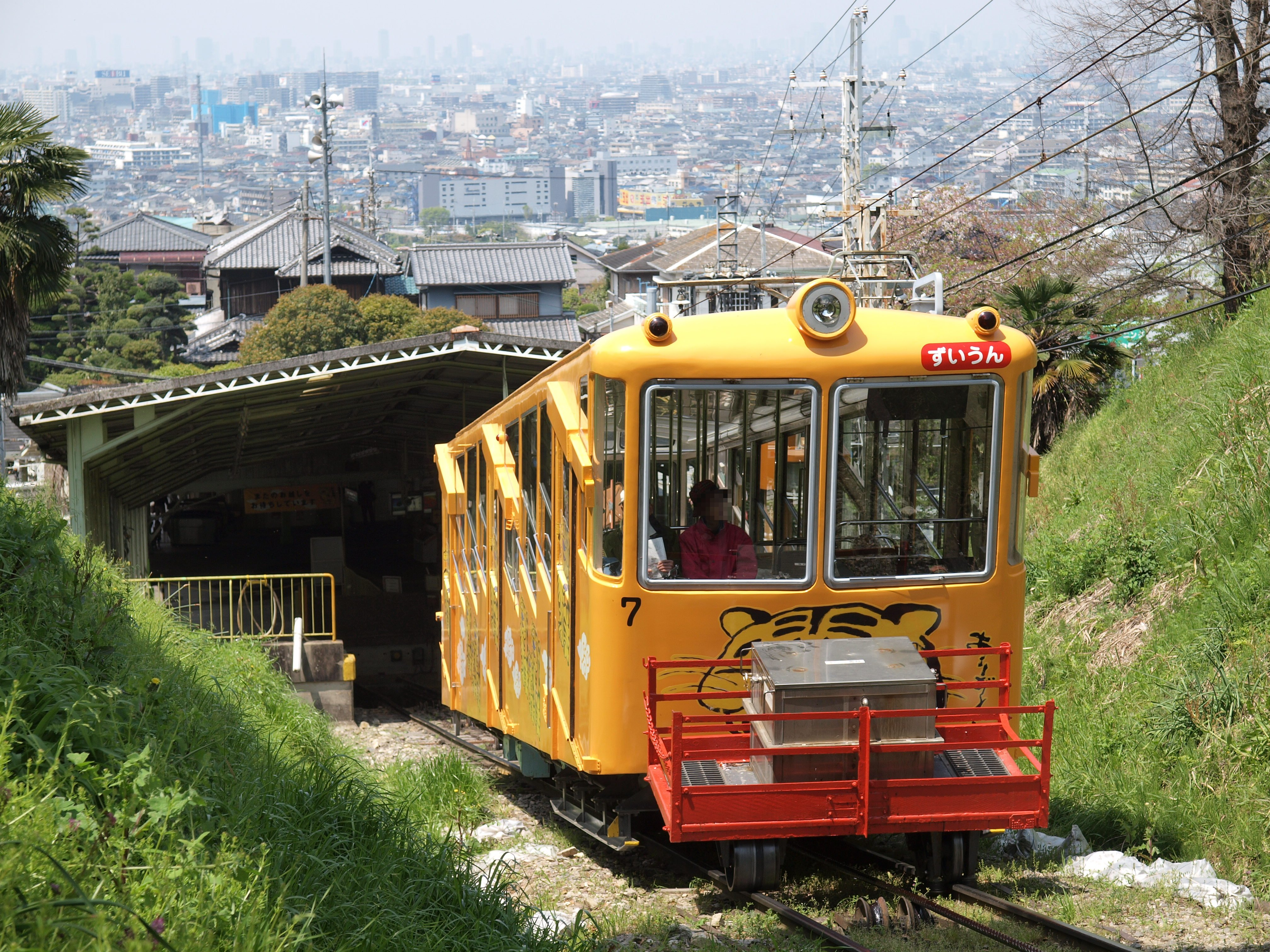
- Nishi-Shigi Cable funicular

Overview
- Native name: 西信貴鋼索線 (西信貴ケーブル)
- Owner: Kintetsu Railway
- Line number: Z
- Locale: Yao, Osaka, Japan
- Termini: Shigisanguchi; Takayasuyama
- Stations: 2
- Color on map: (#B1865B)

Service
- Type: Cable railway
- System: Kintetsu Railway
- Operator(s): Kintetsu Railway

History
- Opened: 15 December 1930; 94 years ago
- Closed: 7 January 1944; 81 years ago
- Reopened: 21 March 1957; 68 years ago

Technical
- Line length: 1.3 km (0.81 mi)
- Number of tracks: 2
- Character: Cable railway
- Track gauge: 1,067 mm (3 ft 6 in)
- Electrification: 200 V DC
- Operating speed: 11.7 km/h (7.3 mph)

The Nishi-Shigi Cable Line (西信貴鋼索線, Nishi-Shigi kōsaku sen; "West Shigi Cable Line"), referred to as Nishi-Shigi Cable (西信貴ケーブル, Nishi-Shigi kēburu), is Japanese cable railway line in Yao, Osaka, owned and operated by Kintetsu Railway. The line, opened in 1930, makes a route to Chōgo Sonshi-ji temple on Mount Shigi. As the line name suggests, there once was Higashi-Shigi Cable Line (東信貴鋼索線, Higashi-Shigi Kōsaku-sen; "East Shigi Cable Line") as well. However, the eastern line was closed in 1983.

== Basic data ==
- Distance: 1.3 km (0.8 mi)
- System: Single track with two cars
- Gauge: 1,067 mm (3 ft 6 in)
- Stations: 2
- Vertical interval: 355 m (1,165 ft)

== Stations ==
No.	Station	Japanese	Distance (km)	Transfers	Location
Z14	Shigisanguchi	信貴山口	0.0	J Shigi Line (J14)	Yao, Osaka
Z15	Takayasuyama	高安山	1.3		Yao, Osaka

== See also ==
- List of funicular railways
- List of railway lines in Japan
