= Kintetsu 8A series =

Japanese electric multiple unit train type

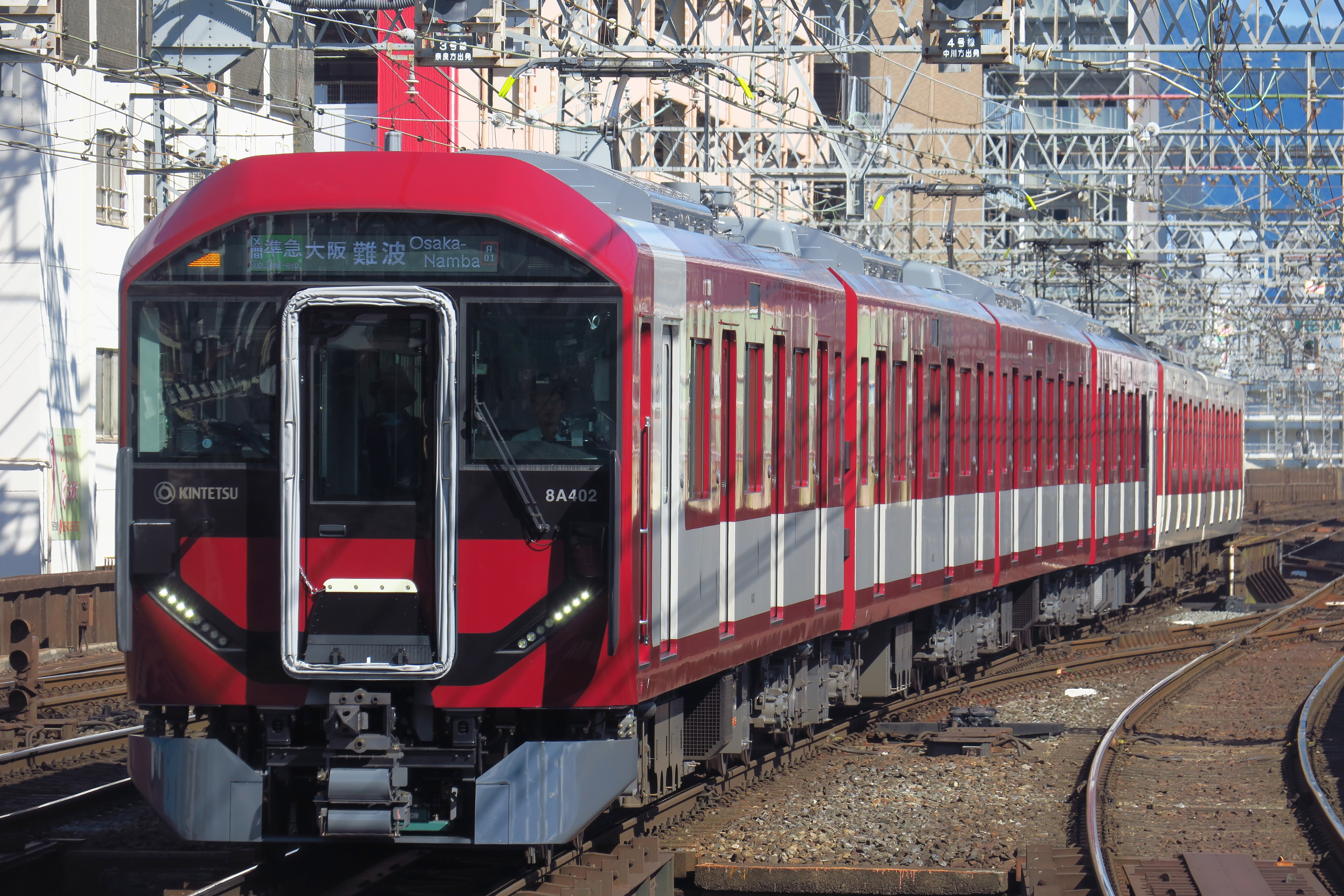
- Set 8A02 in October 2024
- In service: 7 October 2024 – present
- Manufacturer: Kinki Sharyo
- Number under construction: 48 vehicles (12 sets) on order
- Number built: 72 vehicles (18 sets)
- Formation: 4 cars per trainset
- Operator: Kintetsu Railway
- Lines served: A Nara Line; B Kyoto Line; B Kashihara Line; H Tenri Line

Specifications
- Car body construction: Aluminium alloy
- Car length: 20,720 mm (68 ft 0 in)
- Width: 2,800 mm (9 ft 2 in)
- Height: 4,150 mm (13 ft 7 in)
- Doors: Sliding, 4 per side
- Maximum speed: 110 km/h (68 mph)
- Traction system: Hybrid SiC–VVVF
- Traction motors: MB-5183A2 three-phase induction motor
- Power output: 240 kW (320 hp) × 4 per motored car
- Acceleration: 3.0 km/(h⋅s) (1.9 mph/s)
- Deceleration: 4.0 km/(h⋅s) (2.5 mph/s)
- Electric systems: 1,500 V DC (overhead catenary)
- Current collection: Pantograph
- Bogies: KD-327 (motored); KD-327A (trailer)
- Braking system: Electronically controlled pneumatic brakes with regenerative braking
- Multiple working: 1233 series; 1252 series; 9020 series
- Track gauge: 1,435 mm (4 ft 8 1/2 in)

Notes/references
- Specifications: (unless otherwise specified)

The Kintetsu 8A series (Japanese: 近鉄8A系, romanized: Kintetsu 8A-kei) is a commuter electric multiple unit (EMU) train type operated by the private railway operator Kintetsu Railway in Japan since 7 October 2024. Thirty 4-car sets are to be built.

== Overview ==
The 8A series is the first of a new rolling stock generation developed to replace approximately 450 vehicles manufactured in the 1960s, over which they offer 45% energy savings. It is also Kintetsu's first new commuter rolling stock design since the Series 21 trains' introduction in 2000.

The "8A" designation was chosen to reflect the 8A series being the first model of its generation for its operational range. As such, subsequent train types scheduled for introduction on the Osaka, Nagoya, and Minami Osaka lines in fiscal 2025 will not carry the 8A series designation.

== Design ==
The exterior design of the 8A series was created by the Kinkisharyo Industrial design office. The front end adopts an octagonal shape. The 8A series carries a two-tone red-and-white livery designed by GK Industrial Design, inspired by that of older Kintetsu commuter rolling stock. The type also features passenger-operable door switches, a first for Kintetsu (excluding cable cars). LED lighting is used throughout. The door height has also been lowered.

Internally, the trains are primarily equipped with rotating transverse seating with a seat width of 460 mm (18 in). Priority seating is provided at the ends of each car, consisting of fixed longitudinal seating in the intermediate cars. Two Yasashiba (やさしば, lit. 'kindness') spaces are provided near the centremost doors of each car, designed for passengers with large luggage – such as strollers and suitcases – to use without worrying about other occupants. These spaces are fitted with stoppers to prevent the luggage from moving. Large LCD passenger information displays are provided above the doors. The interior was designed by Yasuyuki Kawanishi, CEO of the architectural firm Ichibansen.

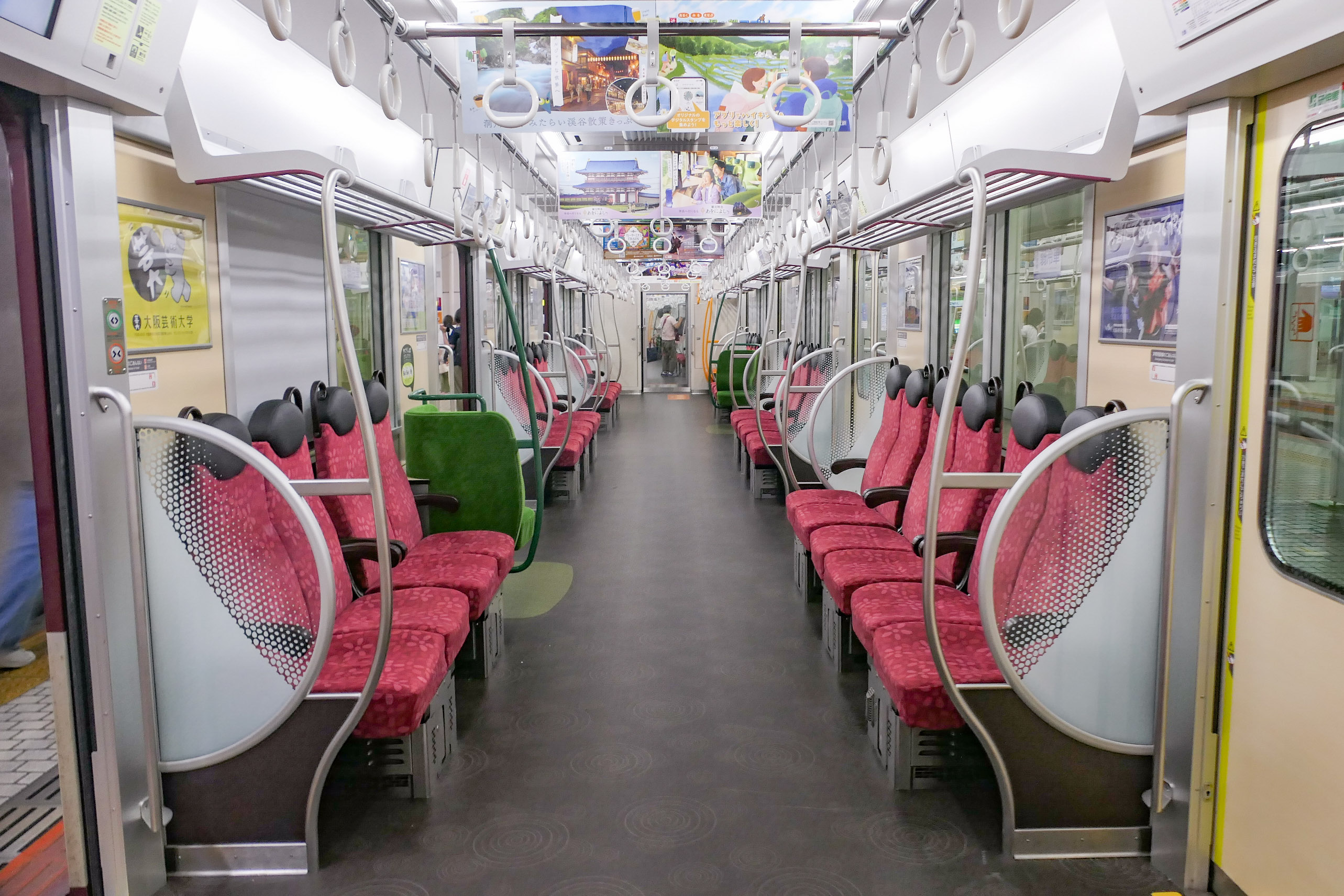
Interior

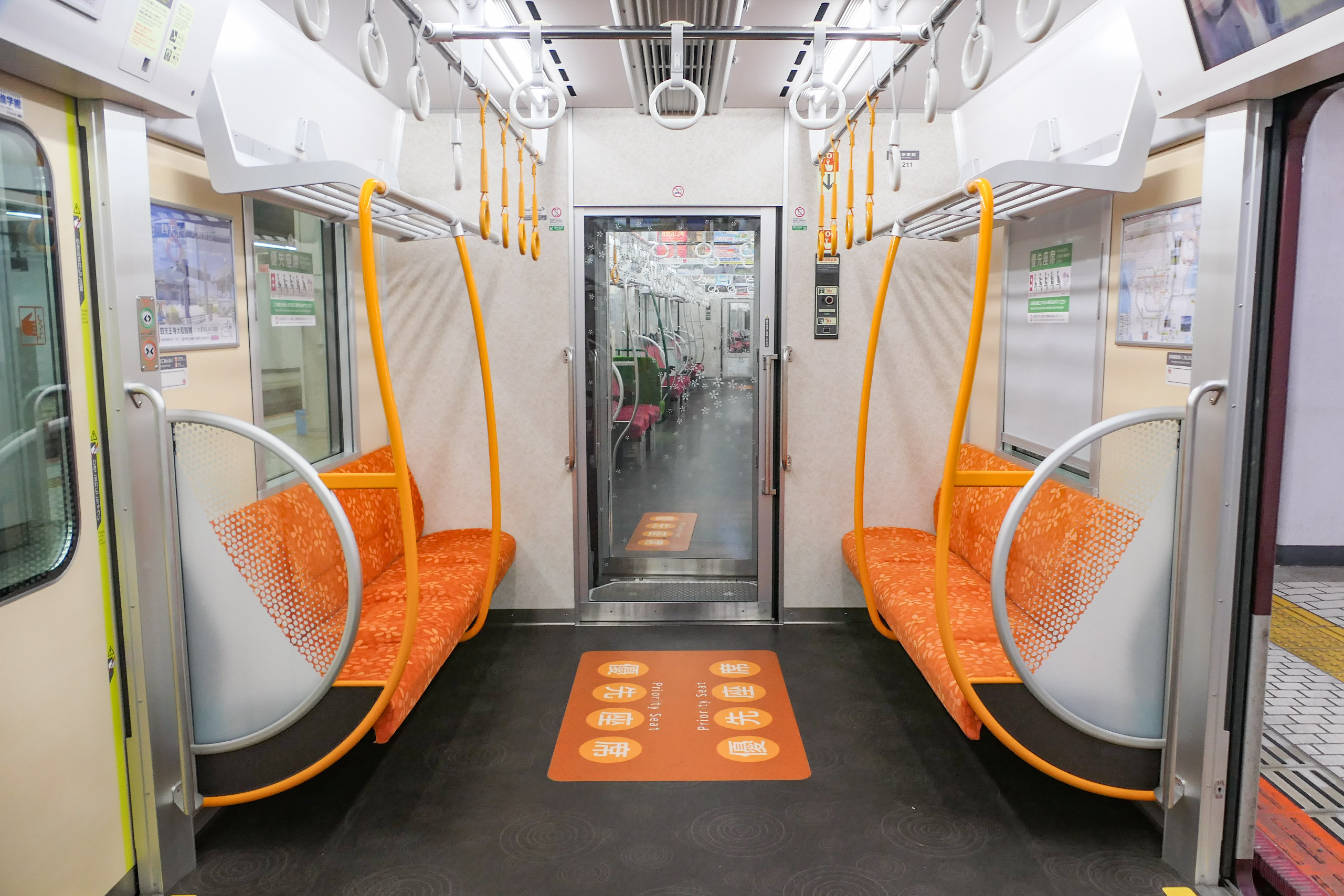
Priority seating

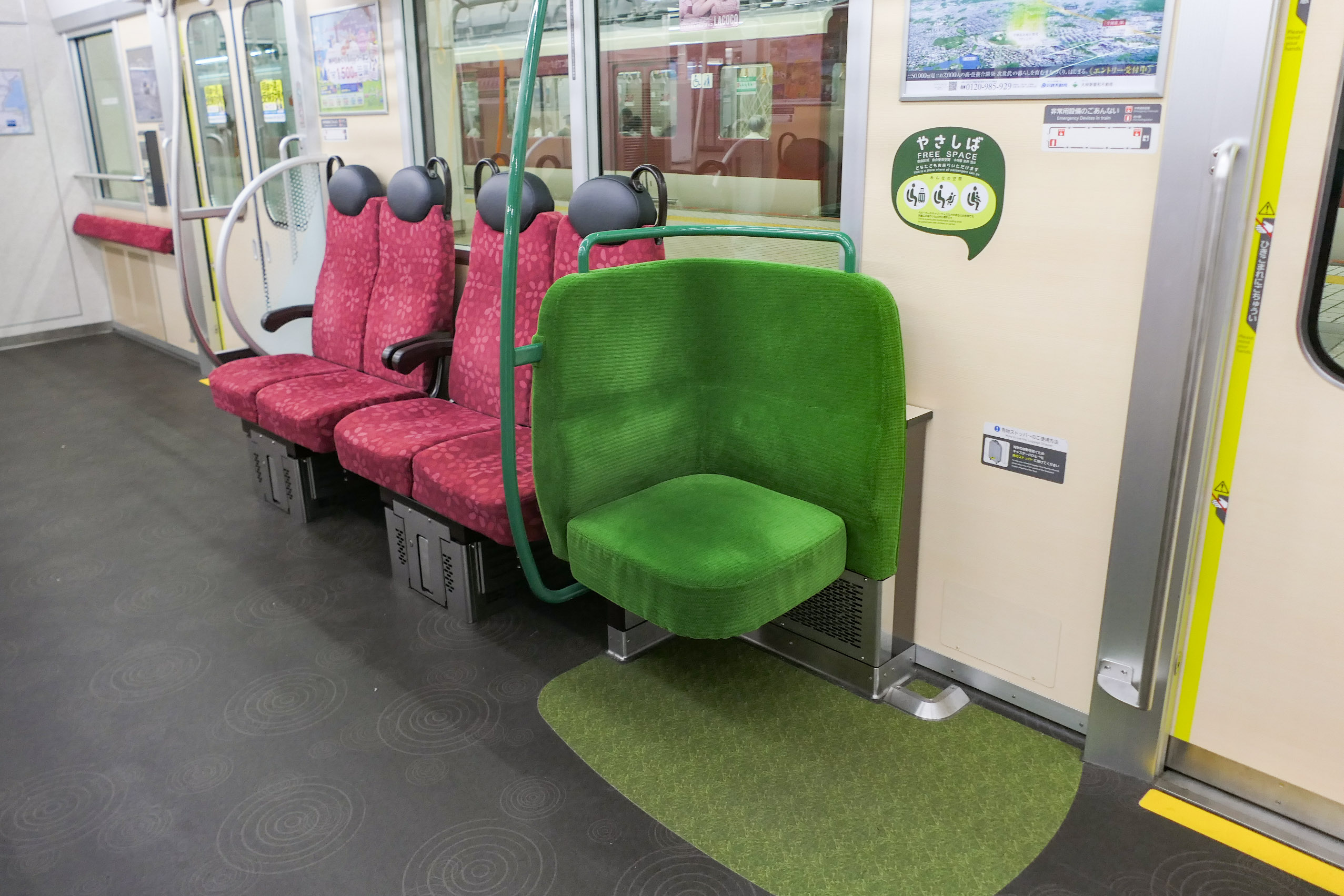
Yasashiba space

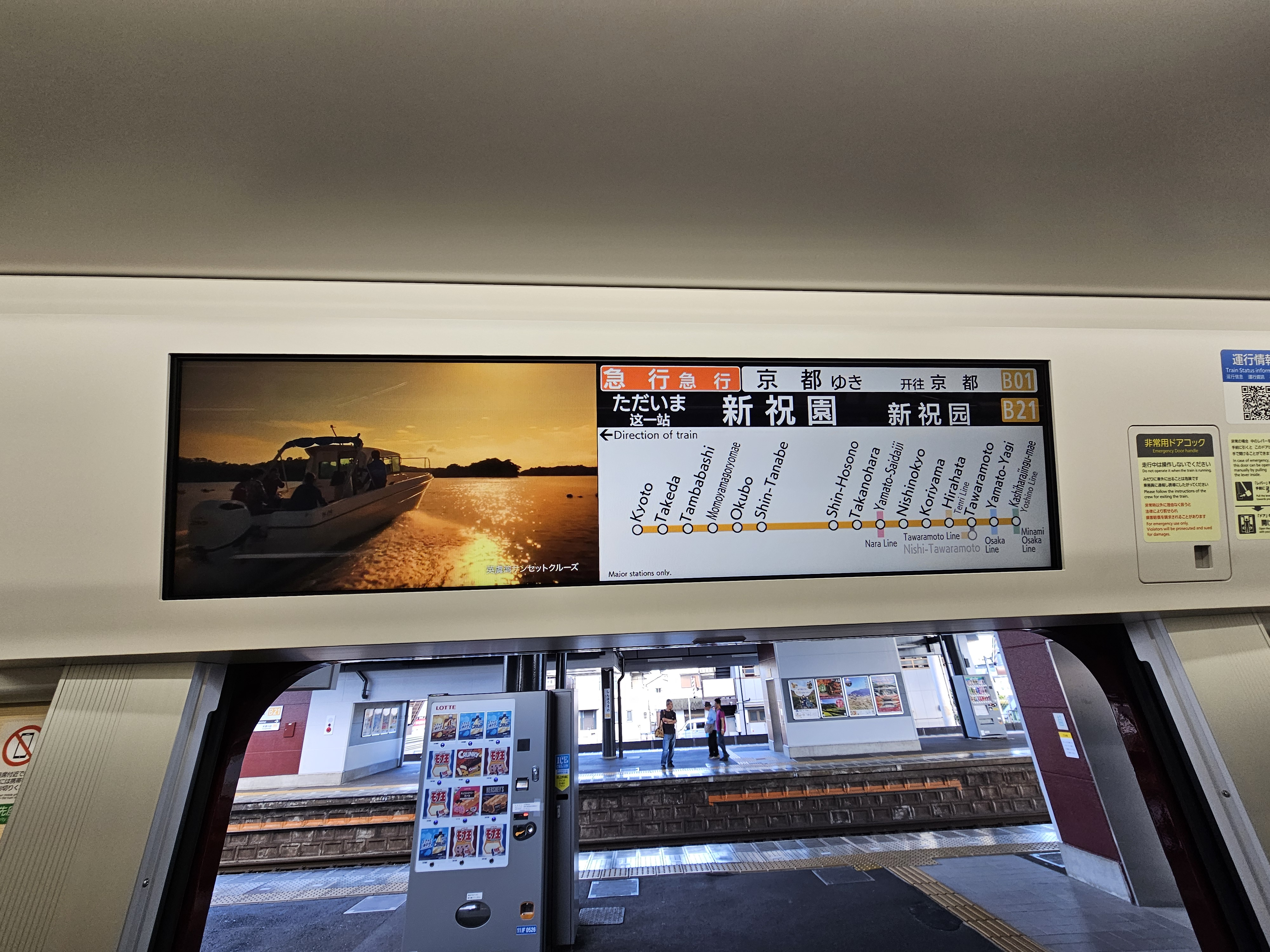
LCD information display

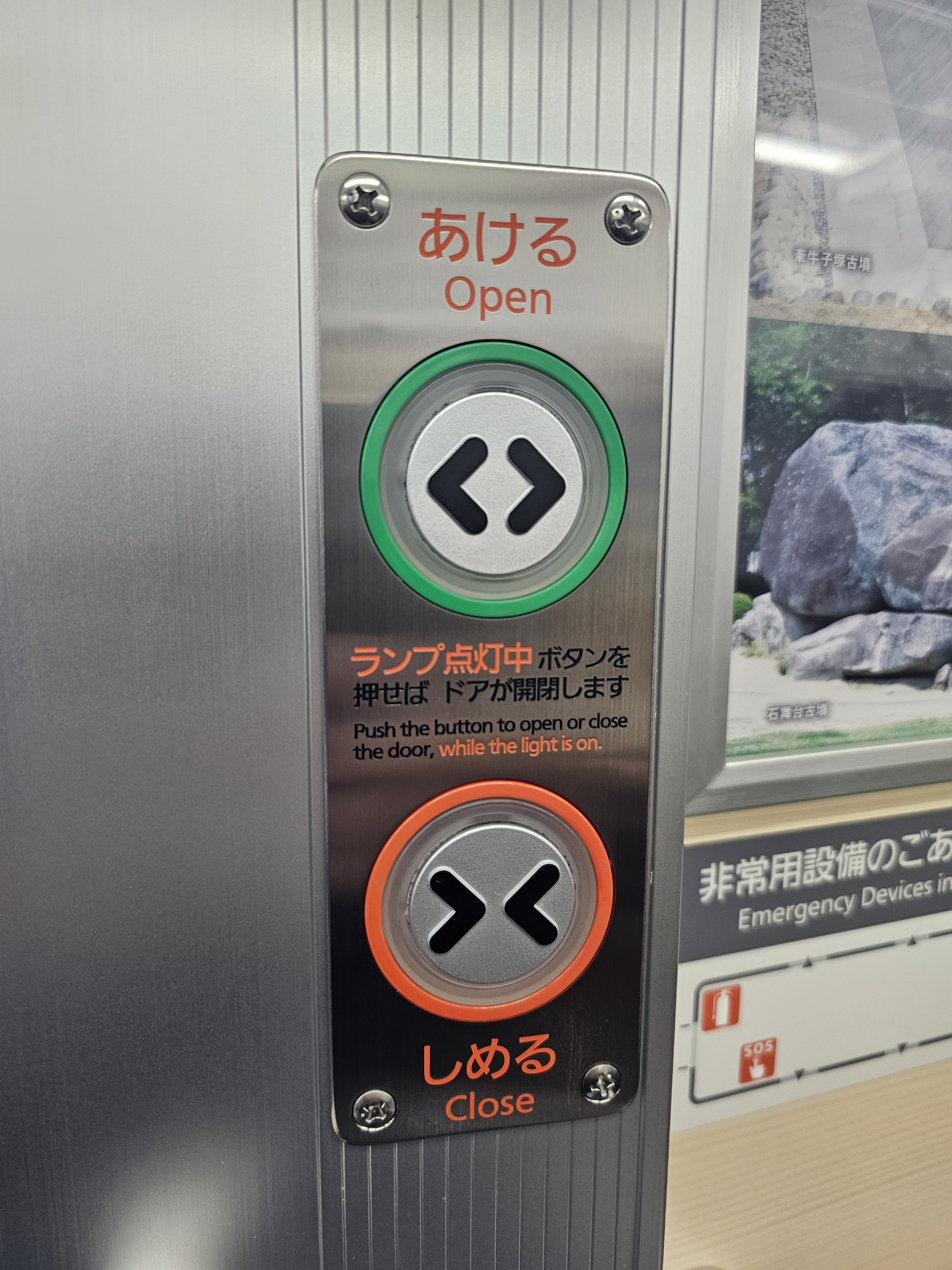
Door switches

== Formation ==
The sets are formed as follows:

	← Nara			
Designation	Ku 8A1 (Tc)	Mo 8A2 (M)	Sa 8A3 (T)	Mo 8A4 (Mc)
Weight (t)	35.0	36.0	29.0	38.5
Capacity (max)	120	130	130	120
Numbering	8A100	8A200	8A300	8A400

The "M" and "Mc" cars are each equipped with one single-arm pantograph.

== History ==
Details of the 8A series were first announced by Kintetsu Railway in May 2024. Twelve 4-car sets were planned to be introduced in fiscal year 2024, with a further nine to be introduced in fiscal 2025.

The first set was delivered from the Kinki Sharyo factory from 31 May 2024. On 18 July, this set underwent daytime test runs.

The 8A series entered service on the Nara, Kyoto, Kashihara, and Tenri lines from 7 October 2024. As of August 2025, 18 sets had been built.

On 22 May 2025, the 8A series was awarded the 2025 Laurel Prize.

In June 2025, Kintetsu announced that, alongside introducing new 1A, 1B, and 6A series trainsets, it would introduce a further nine 8A series 4-car sets between fiscal years 2026 and 2027. These sets will feature onboard toilets.
