= Asecs (shopping mall) =

Coordinates: 57.7739°N 14.2035°E

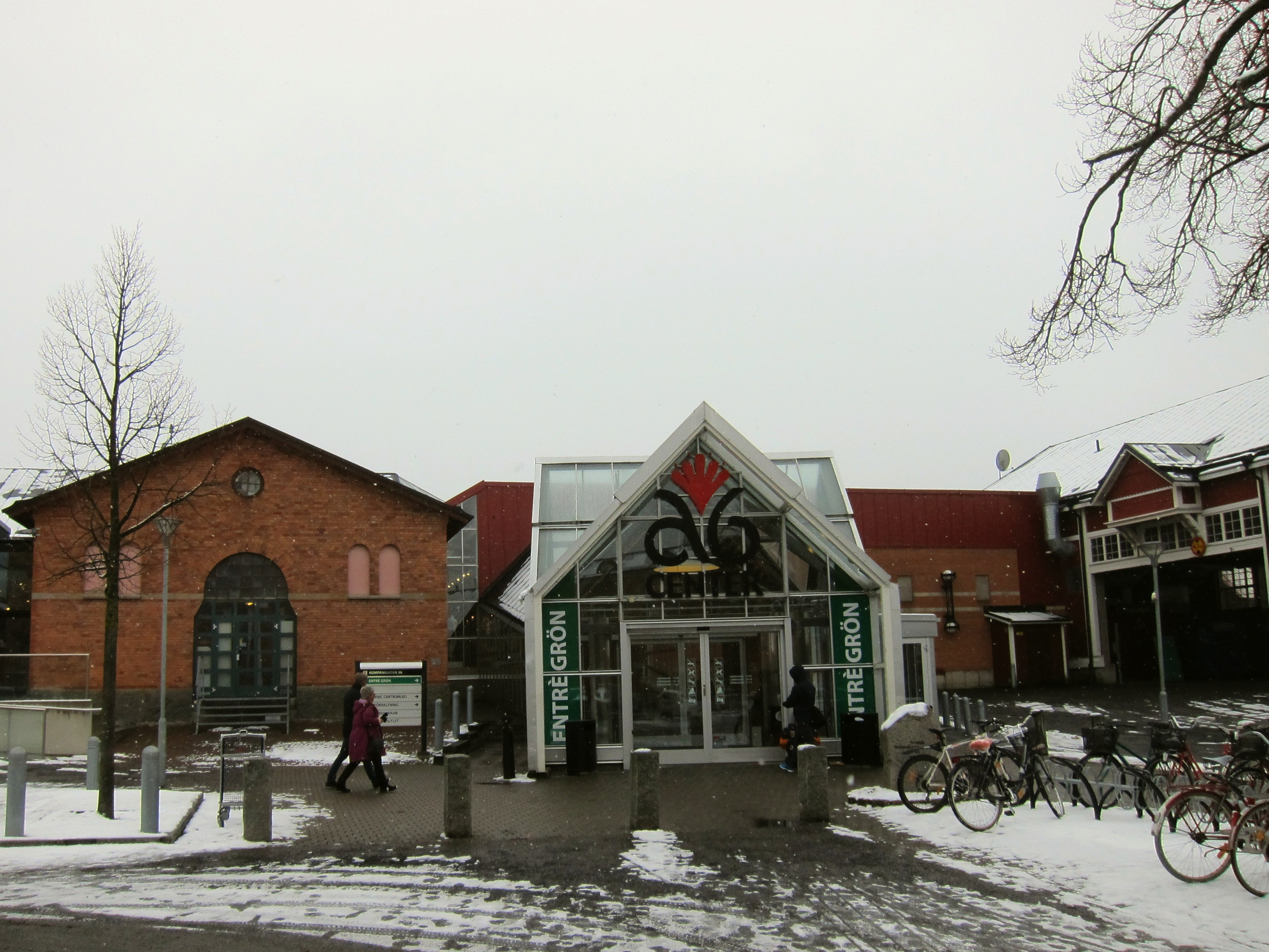
- One of the entrances in January 2015
- Location: Jönköping, Sweden
- Opened: April 2, 1987
- Previous names: A6 Center (1987–2017)
- Website: asecs.se

Asecs, previously A6 Center, is a shopping mall in Jönköping, Sweden. It was opened on 2 April 1987, following the 1985 disestablishment of the Småland Artillery Regiment (commonly known as A 6), which formerly used the building where Asecs is located now.

The shopping mall is located on both the northern and the southern side of the E4 motorway and is connected with a covered bridge spanning across the motorway. Major parts of the shopping mall are located at this bridge. Until 2019, the bridge also housed a McDonald's restaurant from where the motorway could be seen.

On 26 October 2017, the mall changed name to Asecs, spelling-wise.

Asecs can also be reached by train. The closest station is at Rocksjön.
