= Kintetsu 1A and 1B series =

Japanese electric multiple unit train types

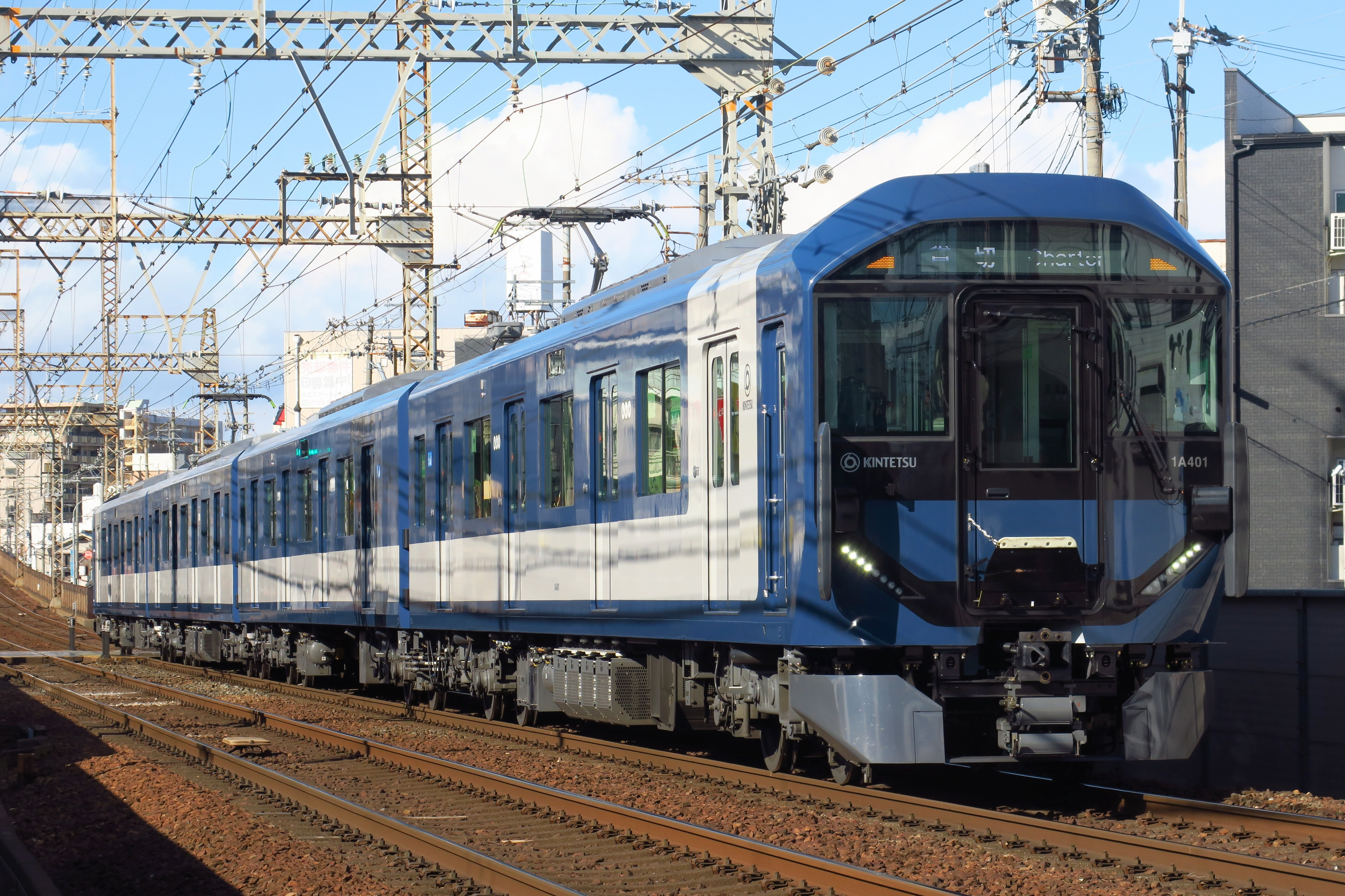
- 1A series train in January 2026
- In service: 16 January 2026 – present
- Manufacturer: Kinki Sharyo
- Constructed: 2025–
- Number under construction: 13 vehicles; 1 × 1A; 3 × 1B
- Number built: 16 vehicles; 4 × 1A
- Formation: 4 cars per 1A series set; 3 cars per 1B series set
- Operators: Kintetsu Railway
- Lines served: Osaka Line (1A series only); Nagoya Line; Toba Line; Yamada Line

Specifications
- Car body construction: Aluminium alloy
- Car length: 20.7 m (67 ft 11 in)
- Width: 2,800 mm (9 ft 2 in)
- Height: 4,150 mm (13 ft 7 in)
- Maximum speed: 120 km/h (75 mph)
- Electric system(s): 1,500 V DC (overhead line)
- Current collection: Single-arm pantograph

The Kintetsu 1A series and 1B series (Japanese: 近鉄1A系・1B系) are commuter electric multiple unit (EMU) train types on order by the private railway operator Kintetsu Railway in Japan.

== Overview ==
Kintetsu Railway announced in 2022 its plans to replace approximately 450 ageing railcars introduced in the 1960s.

Based on the design of the 8A series introduced in 2024, the 1A and 1B series were developed for use on Kintetsu's Osaka, Nagoya, Toba, and Yamada lines. A total of five 1A series 4-car sets (two for the Osaka Line, three for the Nagoya Line) were planned for introduction in January 2026, with three 1B series 3-car sets planned for introduction in fiscal 2026 on the Nagoya Line.

== Design ==
The 1A and 1B series follow similar internal specifications to those of the 8A series, featuring rotating transverse seating bays and Yasashiba (やさしば, lit. 'kindness') spaces. The 1A series also features onboard toilets. The trains carry a similar livery to that of the 8A series, although they feature an "evolutionary blue" colour scheme oweing to their operational range, instead of the 8A series' "traditional red".

The 1A series is equipped with rheostatic braking and additional disc brakes to improve performance on steep downhill gradients.

== History ==
The first 1A series set, 1A01, was delivered from the Kinki Sharyo factory in Higashiosaka, Japan, in 2025. By 11 January 2026, four 1A series sets had been built.

The 1A series entered revenue service on 16 January 2026. The type was the first new commuter train to be introduced on the Nagoya Line since the 5800 series in 1997.
