= HMS A6 =

Submarine of the Royal Navy

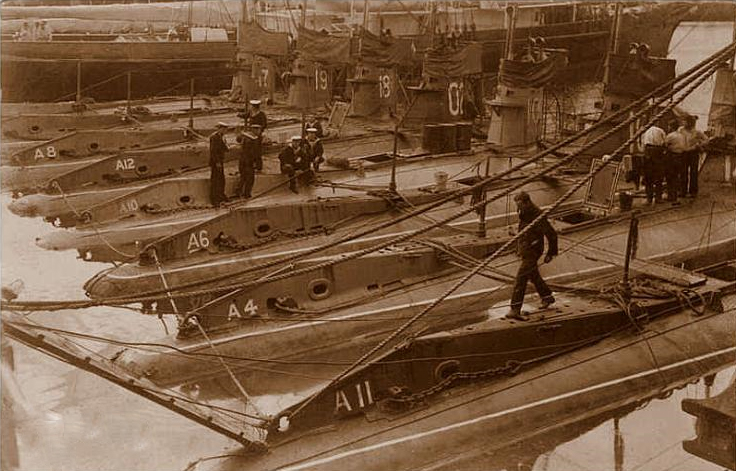
- A group of British "A" class submarines

History

United Kingdom
- Name: HMS A6
- Builder: Vickers, Sons & Maxim Ltd. Barrow-in-Furness
- Laid down: 1 September 1903
- Launched: 3 March 1904
- Commissioned: 23 March 1905
- Fate: Sold, 8 October 1920 for breaking up

General characteristics
- Class & type: A-class submarine
- Displacement: 190 long tons (193 t) surfaced; 206 long tons (209 t) submerged
- Length: 105 ft (32.0 m)
- Beam: 12 ft 9 in (3.9 m)
- Draught: 10 ft 8 in (3.3 m)
- Installed power: 550 bhp (410 kW) (petrol engine); 150 hp (110 kW) (electric motor)
- Propulsion: 1 × 16-cylinder Wolseley petrol engine; 1 × electric motor
- Speed: 11 knots (20 km/h; 13 mph) surfaced; 7 knots (13 km/h; 8.1 mph) submerged
- Range: 500 nautical miles (930 km; 580 mi) at 10 kn (19 km/h; 12 mph) surfaced
- Complement: 2 officers and 9 ratings
- Armament: 2 × 18-inch (45 cm) torpedo tubes

HMS A6 was an A-class submarine built for the Royal Navy in the first decade of the 20th century.

== Design and description ==
A6 was a member of the first British class of submarines, although slightly larger, faster and more heavily armed than the lead ship, HMS A1. The submarine had a length of 105 feet 1 inch (32.0 m) overall, a beam of 12 feet 9 inches (3.9 m) and a mean draught of 10 feet 8 inches (3.3 m). They displaced 190 long tons (190 t) on the surface and 206 long tons (209 t) submerged. The A-class submarines had a crew of 2 officers and 9 ratings.

For surface running, the boats were powered by a single 16-cylinder 550-brake-horsepower (410 kW) Wolseley petrol engine that drove one propeller shaft. When submerged the propeller was driven by a 150-horsepower (112 kW) electric motor. They could reach 11 knots (20 km/h; 13 mph) on the surface and 7 knots (13 km/h; 8.1 mph) underwater. On the surface, A6 had a range of 500 nautical miles (930 km; 580 mi) at 10 knots (19 km/h; 12 mph); submerged the boat had a range of 30 nautical miles (56 km; 35 mi) at 5 knots (9.3 km/h; 5.8 mph).

The boats were armed with two 18-inch (45 cm) torpedo tubes in the bow. They could carry a pair of reload torpedoes, but generally did not as doing so that they had to compensate for their weight by an equivalent weight of fuel.

== Construction and career ==
A6 was ordered as part of the 1903–04 Naval Programme from at Vickers. She was laid down at the shipyard in Barrow-in-Furness on 1 September 1903, launched on 3 March 1904 and completed on 23 March 1905.

A6 ran aground on a sandbank in Sandown harbour on 31 July 1906, but received little damage.
