= Kintetsu Railway =

Japanese passenger railway company

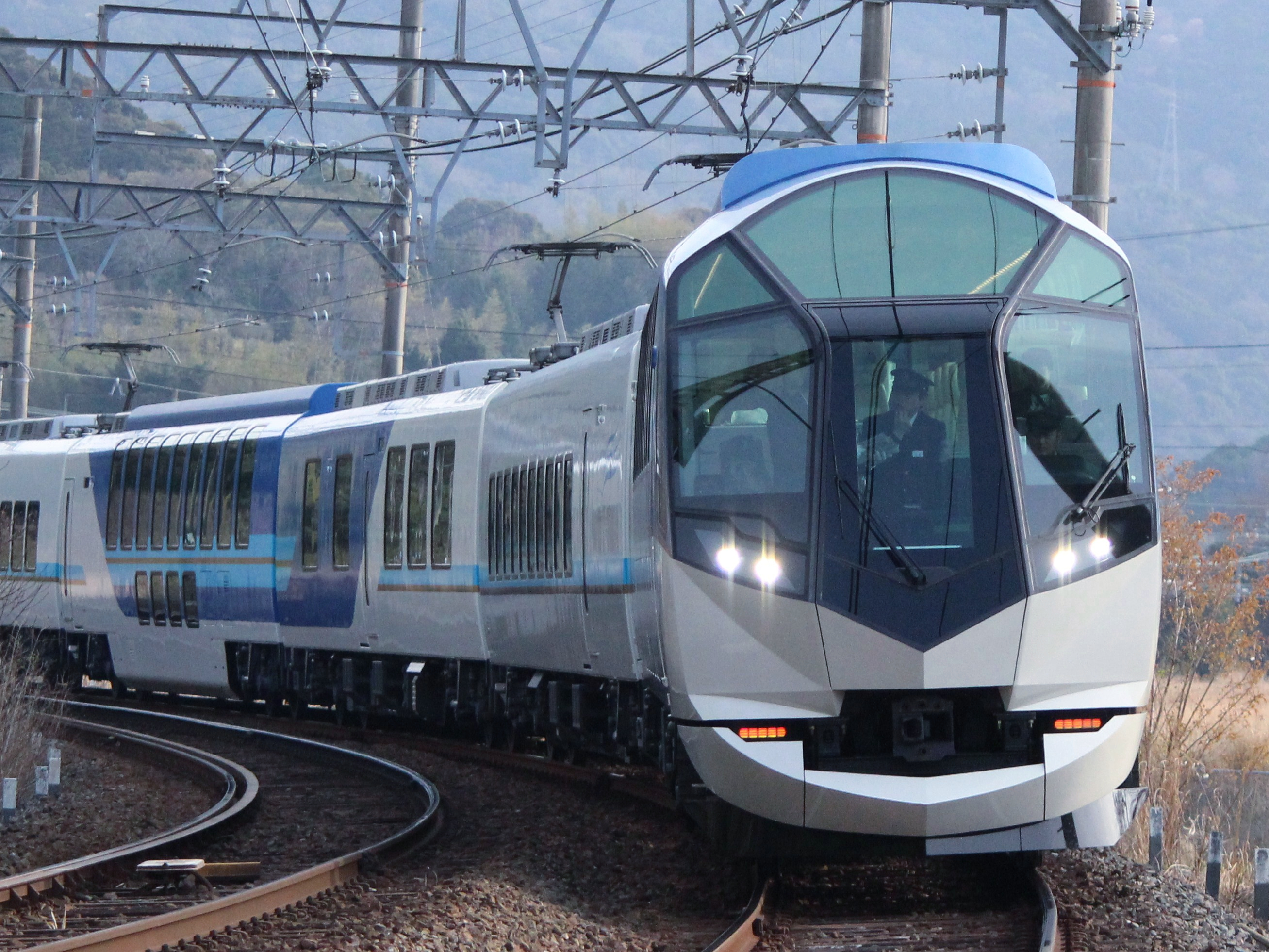
- 50000 series on a Shimakaze limited express service

Overview
- Headquarters: 6-1-55, Uehonmachi, Tennoji-ku, Osaka, Osaka Prefecture, Japan
- Locale: Kinki region/Tōkai region, Japan
- Dates of operation: 16 September 1910; 115 years ago–present
- Predecessor: Kansai Express Electric Railway; Nankai Railway

Technical
- Track gauge: 1,435 mm (4 ft 8 1/2 in); 1,067 mm (3 ft 6 in)
- Electrification: 1,500 V DC, overhead line; 750 V DC, third rail (Keihanna Line)
- Length: 501.2 km (311.4 miles)

Other
- Website: www.kintetsu.co.jp/foreign/english/

Kintetsu Railway Co., Ltd.
- Native name: 近畿日本鉄道株式会社
- Romanized name: Kinki-nippon Tetsudō Kabushiki gaisha
- Formerly: Kintetsu Split Preparatory Company, Ltd.
- Type: Private KK
- Industry: Ground Transport
- Predecessor: Kintetsu Corporation formerly Kinki-nippon Railway Company, Limited
- Founded: 30 April 2014; 12 years ago in Osaka, Osaka Prefecture, Japan
- Key people: Tetsuya Kobayashi (Chairman); Michiyoshi Wadabayashi (President)
- Services: Passenger Transport
- Parent: Kintetsu Group Holdings
- Website: www.kintetsu.co.jp/foreign/english/ (in English)

Kintetsu Railway Co., Ltd. (近畿日本鉄道株式会社, Kinki-nippon Tetsudō Kabushiki-gaisha lit. 'Kinki-Japan Railway Co Ltd'), referred to as Kintetsu (近鉄) and officially Kinki-Nippon Railway, is a Japanese passenger railway company, managing infrastructure and operating passenger train service. Its railway system is the largest in Japan, excluding Japan Railways Group. The railway network connects Osaka, Nara, Kyoto, Nagoya, Tsu, Ise, and Yoshino. Kintetsu Railway Co., Ltd. is a wholly owned subsidiary of Kintetsu Group Holdings Co., Ltd.

== History ==
On 16 September 1910, Nara Tramway Co., Ltd. (奈良軌道株式会社, Nara Kidō) was founded and renamed Osaka Electric Tramway Co., Ltd. (大阪電気軌道株式会社, Ōsaka Denki Kidō; Daiki (大軌)) a month after. Osaka Electric Tramway completed Ikoma Tunnel and started operating a line between Osaka and Nara (present-day Nara Line) on 30 April 1914. The modern Kashihara, Osaka, and Shigi lines were completed in the 1920s, followed by the Kyoto Line (a cooperative venture with Keihan Electric Railway). Daiki founded Sangu Electric Railway Co., Ltd. (参宮急行電鉄株式会社, Sangū Kyūkō Dentetsu; Sankyū (参急)) in 1927, which consolidated Ise Electric Railway Co., Ltd. (伊勢電気鉄道株式会社, Ise Denki Tetsudō; Iseden (伊勢電)) on 15 September 1936.

In 1938, Daiki teamed up with its subsidiary Kansai Express Electric Railway Co., Ltd. (関西急行電鉄株式会社, Kansai Kyūkō Dentetsu) to operate the first private railway service from Osaka to Nagoya. Another subsidiary Sankyū bought Kansai Express Electric Railway on 1 January 1940 and continued the service on its own. Then, Sankyū consolidated Yoro Railway Co., Ltd. (養老鉄道株式会社, Yōrō Tetsudō; not the present Yoro Railway Co., Ltd.) on 1 August. Daiki consolidated its largest subsidiary Sankyū on 15 March 1941 and was renamed Kansai Express Railway Co., Ltd. (関西急行鉄道, Kansai Kyūko Tetsudō; Kankyū (関急)). Kankyū consolidated Osaka Railway Co., Ltd. (大阪鉄道株式会社, Ōsaka Tetsudō; Daitetsu (大鉄), owner of the present Minami Osaka Line) on 1 February 1943 and moved its headquarters from Uehommachi to Osaka Abenobashi.

Kankyū was renamed Kinki Nippon Railway Co., Ltd. (近畿日本鉄道株式会社, Kinki Nippon Tetsudō; Kinki Nippon (近畿日本) or Kin-nichi (近日)) after it consolidated Nankai Railway in June 1944: it maintained the name when Nankai regained its independence in 1947.

After World War II, Kintetsu branched out and became one of the world's largest travel agencies, Kinki Nippon Tourist Co., Ltd., opening offices in the United States of America (Kintetsu International Express, Inc.) and other countries.

The first charged limited express train service started between Uehommachi and Nagoya in 1947, and this is the start of the present Kintetsu limited express trains. The rail network was mostly completed by consolidating Nara Electric Railway Co., Ltd. (奈良電気鉄道株式会社; Naraden (奈良電)), Shigi-Ikoma Electric Railway Co., Ltd. (信貴生駒電鉄株式会社), Mie Electric Railway Co., Ltd. (三重電気鉄道株式会社; Mieden (三重電)) and other companies.

Kintetsu moved its headquarters again from Osaka Abenobashi to Osaka Uehommachi on 5 December 1969.

On 28 June 2003, Kinki Nippon Railway Co., Ltd. was renamed Kintetsu Corporation. The corporation was split on 1 April 2015. Its railway business division was succeeded by Kintetsu Split Preparatory Company, Ltd. (founded on 30 April 2014), while its real estate business division by Kintetsu Real Estate Co., Ltd., its hotel business division by Kintetsu Hotel Systems, Inc., and its retail business by Kintetsu Retail Service Corporation, respectively.

On the same day Kintetsu Corporation was split, it was renamed as Kintetsu Group Holdings Co., Ltd. as a holding company, while Kintetsu Split Preparatory Company, Ltd. was renamed as Kintetsu Railway Co., Ltd.

=== Abbreviations ===
From its founding to present
- 16 September 1910—14 April 1941: Daiki (大軌)
- 15 April 1941—31 May 1944: Kankyū (関急)
- 1 June 1944—1948: Kinki Nippon (近畿日本) or Kin-nichi (近日)
- Present: Kintetsu (近鉄) — used for the official corporate name in English since 2003.
Acquired or merged companies
- Sangu Express Electric Railway Co., Ltd.: Sankyū (参急)
- Ise Electric Railway Co., Ltd.: Iseden (伊勢電)
- Osaka Railway Co., Ltd.: Daitetsu (大鉄)
- Nara Electric Railway Co., Ltd.: Naraden (奈良電)
- Mie Electric Railway Co., Ltd.: Mieden (三重電)

== Lines ==
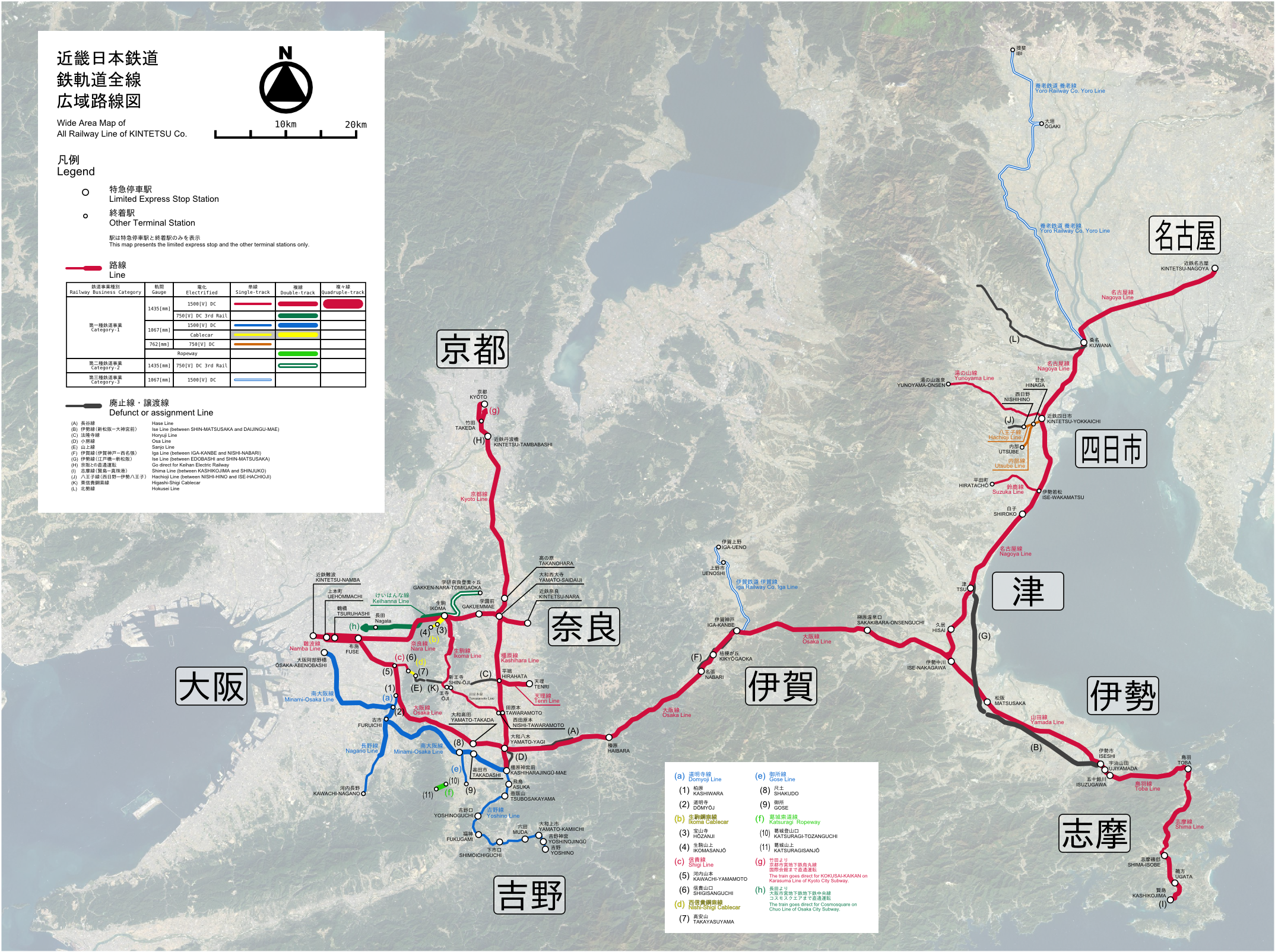
Map of the Kintetsu Railway

=== Owned and operated lines (Type I Railway Business), funiculars, and aerial tramway ===
Following lines belong to Kintetsu's Type I Railway Business (第一種鉄道事業, Dai-isshu tetsudō jigyō) and Cableway (索道, sakudō) Business under the Railway Business Act. This means that Kintetsu is the owner and operator of the lines.

==== 1,435 mm (4 ft 8 1/2 in) standard gauge lines ====
All lines operate with 1,500 V DC overhead catenary except for the Keihanna Line, which operates on 750 V DC third rail.

- Osaka Line and its branch
  - D Osaka Line (Osaka Uehommachi - Ise-Nakagawa)
    - J Shigi Line (Kawachi-Yamamoto - ShigiSangūchi)
- Nagoya Line and its branches
  - E Nagoya Line (Kintetsu Nagoya - Ise-Nakagawa)
    - K Yunoyama Line (Kintetsu Yokkaichi - Yunoyama-Onsen)
    - L Suzuka Line (Ise-Wakamatsu - Hiratacho)
- Yamada/Toba/Shima Line
  - M Yamada Line (Ise-Nakagawa - Ujiyamada)
  - M Toba Line (Ujiyamada - Toba)
  - M Shima Line (Toba - Kashikojima)
- Namba/Nara Line and its branch
  - A Namba Line (Ōsaka Namba - Ōsaka Uehommachi)
  - A Nara Line (Fuse - Kintetsu-Nara)
    - G Ikoma Line (Ikoma - Oji)
- C Keihanna Line (Nagata - Gakken Nara-Tomigaoka)**
- Kyoto/Kashihara Line and its branches
  - B Kyoto Line (Kyoto - Yamato-Saidaiji)
  - B Kashihara Line (Yamato-Saidaiji - Kashiharajingu-mae)
    - H Tenri Line (Hirahata - Tenri)
    - I Tawaramoto Line (Shin-Oji - Nishi-Tawaramoto)

==== 1,067 mm (3 ft 6 in) narrow-gauge lines ====
- Minami Osaka/Yoshino Line and its branches
  - F Minami Osaka Line (Osaka Abenobashi - Kashiharajingu-mae)
    - N Domyoji Line (Domyoji - Kashiwara)
    - O Nagano Line (Furuichi - Kawachi-Nagano)
    - P Gose Line (Shakudo - Kintetsu Gose)
  - F Yoshino Line (Kashiharajingu-mae - Yoshino)

==== Cable car (Funicular) lines ====
- Y Ikoma Line (Toriimae - Ikoma-Sanjo)
- Z Nishi-Shigi Line (ShigiSangūchi - Takayasuyama)

==== Ropeway (aerial tramway) ====
- Katsuragisan Ropeway (Katsuragi-tozanguchi - Katsuragi-sanjo)

=== Operated lines owned by other entities (Type II Railway Business) ===
Following line belongs to Kintetsu's Type II Railway Business (第二種鉄道事業, Dai-nishu tetsudō jigyō) under the Railway Business Act. This means that Kintetsu operates trains on the line, but the owner of the railway trackage is a separate company.

- 1,435 mm (4 ft 8 1/2 in) standard gauge line
  - C Keihanna Line (Ikoma - Gakken-Nara-Tomigaoka, trackage owned by Nara Ikoma Rapid Transit Railway Co., Ltd.)

=== Owned lines operated by other entities (Type III Railway Business) ===
Following lines belong to Kintetsu's Type III Railway Business (第三種鉄道事業, Dai-sanshu tetsudō jigyō) under the Railway Business Act. This means that Kintetsu is the owner of the railway facility, but the trains are operated by separate companies.

- 1,067 mm (3 ft 6 in) narrow-gauge lines
  - Iga Line (Iga-Ueno - Iga-Kambe, trains operated by Iga Railway Co., Ltd.)
  - Yōrō Line (Kuwana - Ogaki - Ibi, trains operated by Yōrō Railway Co., Ltd.)

Until 30 September 2007, those lines were part of the Category 1 railway business.

=== Through-train services ===
Kintetsu trains also operate through service onto the Osaka Metro Chūō Line (all Keihanna Line trains), the Kyoto Municipal Subway Karasuma Line, and the Hanshin Railway Hanshin Namba Line, but such lines are not Kintetsu lines.

=== Abandoned lines and transferred lines ===
- Hase Line (長谷線) (Sakurai - Hase, abandoned 1 February 1938)
- Sanjo Line (山上線) (Takayasuyama - Shigizammon, discontinued on 7 January 1944 and abandoned on 21 March 1957)
- Horyuji Line (法隆寺線) (Shin-Horyuji - Hirahata, discontinued on 11 February 1945 and abandoned on 1 April 1952)
- Obusa Line (小房線) (Unebi - Kashiharajingu-eki, discontinued on 1 June 1950 and abandoned on 1 September 1952)
- Ise Line (伊勢線) (Edobashi - Shin-Matsusaka - Daijingu-mae)
  - Shin-Matsusaka - Daijingu-mae: abandoned on 11 August 1942
  - Edobashi - Shin-Matsusaka: abandoned on 22 January 1961
- Iga Line (伊賀線) (Nishi-Nabari - Iga-Kambe, abandoned on 1 October 1964)
- Shima Line (志摩線) (Kashikojima - Shinjuko, abandoned on 1 July 1969)
- Hachioji Line (八王子線) (Nishihino - Ise-Hachioji, discontinued on 25 July 1974 and abandoned on 1 April 1976)
- Higashi-Shigi Cable Line (東信貴鋼索線) (Shigisanshita - Shigisan, abandoned on 1 September 1983)
- Hokusei Line (Nishi-Kuwana - Ageki, transferred to Sangi Railway Co. on 1 April 2003)
- Utsube Line (Kintetsu Yokkaichi - Utsube, transferred to Yokkaichi Asunaro Railway Company on 1 April 2015)
- Hachioji Line (Hinaga - Nishi-Hino, transferred to Yokkaichi Asunaro Railway Company on 1 April 2015)

==== Lines transferred to Nankai Electric Railway ====
To separate both former Kankyū lines and Nankai Railway lines, on 1 June 1947, the following lines were transferred to Nankai Electric Railway Co. Ltd. that was renamed from Kōyasan Electric Railway Co., Ltd.

- Nankai Main Line (Namba - Wakayamashi)
  - Tennoji Branch Line (天王寺支線) (Tengachaya - Tennoji)
    - Tengachaya - Imaikecho: abandoned on 18 November 1984
    - Imaikecho - Tennoji: abandoned on 1 July 1993
  - Takashinohama Line (Hagoromo - Takashinohama)
  - Tanagawa Line (Misakikoen - Tanagawa)
  - Kada Line (Kinokawa - Kada)
  - Kitajima Branch Line (北島支線) (Wakayamashi - Higashi-Matsue, abandoned on 1 December 1966)
- Koya Line (Shiomibashi - Koyashita)
- Hankai Line (Ebisucho - Hamadera-eki-mae) (transferred to Hankai Tramway Co., Ltd. on 1 December 1980)
  - Ohama Branch Line (大浜支線) (Shukuin - Ohama-kitaguchi - Ohamakaigan)
    - Ohama-kitaguchi - Ohamakaigan: abandoned on 11 February 1945
    - Shukuin - Ohama-kitaguchi: closed on 10 July 1945, abandoned on 28 November 1980
  - Uemachi Line (Tennoji-eki-mae - Sumiyoshikoen) (transferred to Hankai Tramway Co., Ltd. on 1 December 1980)
  - Hirano Line (平野線) (Imaike - Hirano) (abandoned on 28 November 1980)

=== Unbuilt lines ===
- Gifu Line (岐阜線) (Ogaki - Gifu or Hashima), planned by Yoro Electric Railway Co.
- Shijonawate Line (四条畷線) (Sakuranomiya - Nukata), planned by Osaka Electric Railway Co.

== Rolling stock ==
As of 1 April 2017, Kintetsu operates a fleet of 1,905 electric multiple unit (EMU) vehicles, the second largest fleet for a private railway operator in Japan after Tokyo Metro (2,766 vehicles). The newest Hinotori 80000 series EMU trainsets entered revenue service on limited express services between Osaka Namba and Kintetsu Nagoya in spring 2020. Eight six-car sets and three eight-car sets, 72 vehicles in total, will enter service by 2021. The end cars in each set will be designated "High Grade cars" with 1+2 abreast seating and a seat pitch of 1,300 mm (51 in). The intermediate "Regular" cars will have 2+2 abreast seating and a seat pitch of 1,160 mm (46 in). Seating in both types of accommodation will consist of fixed-back shell seats.

A new generation of rolling stock for the commuter fleet, designated as the 8A series, entered service in October 2024. Another type of new generation rolling stock, designated as the 1A series, entered service in January 2026.

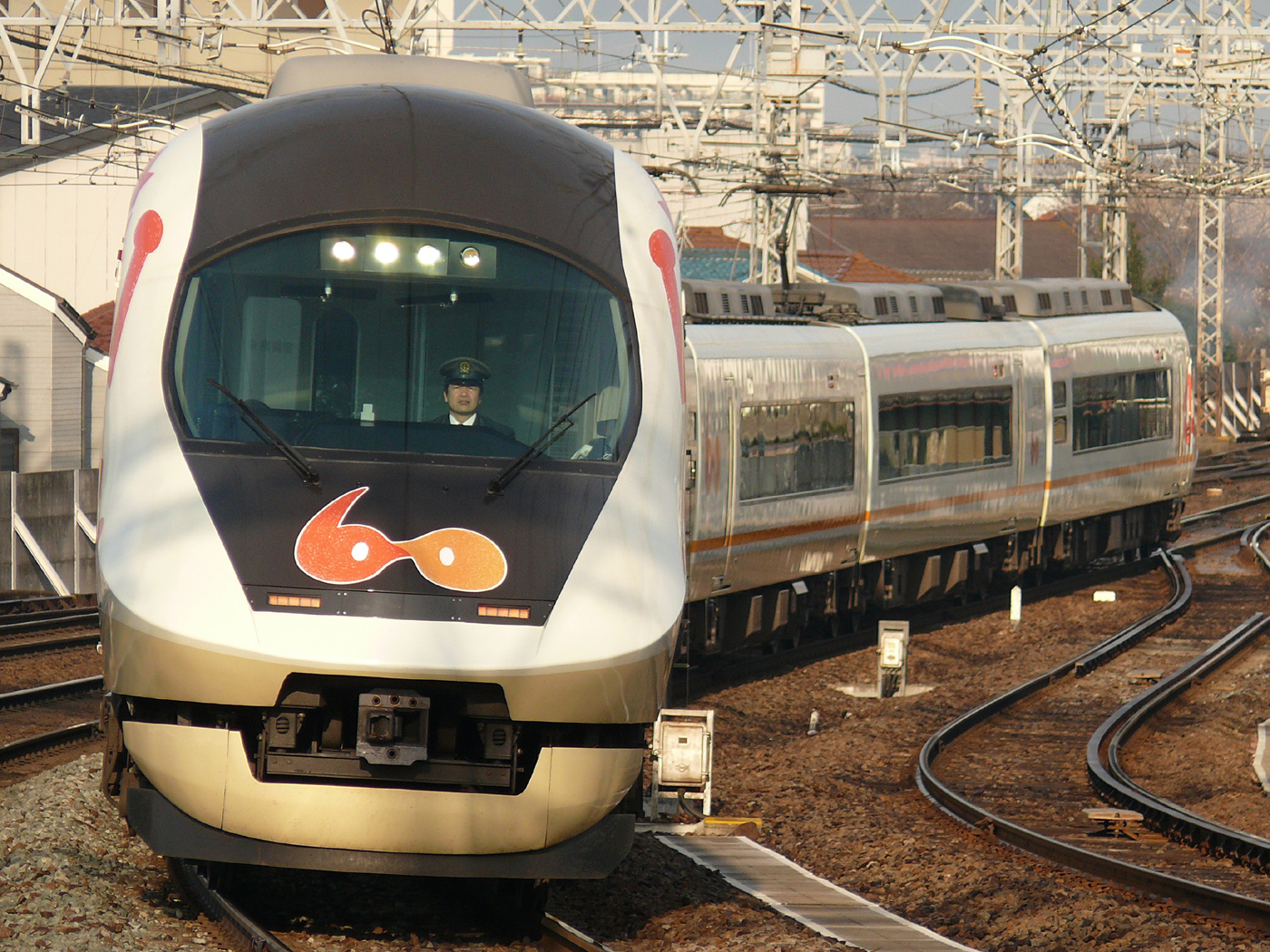
21020 series Urban Liner next

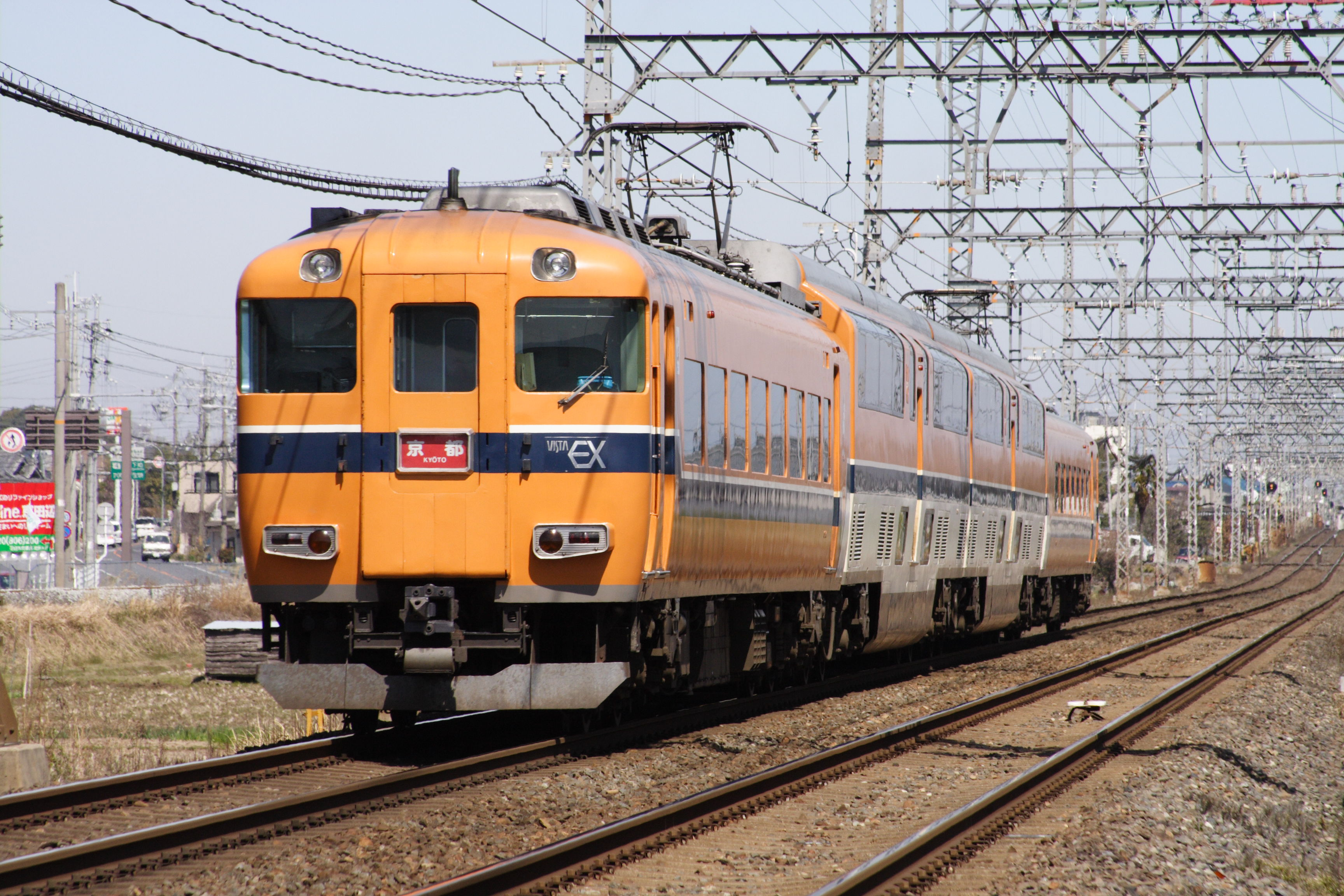
30000 series Vista EX

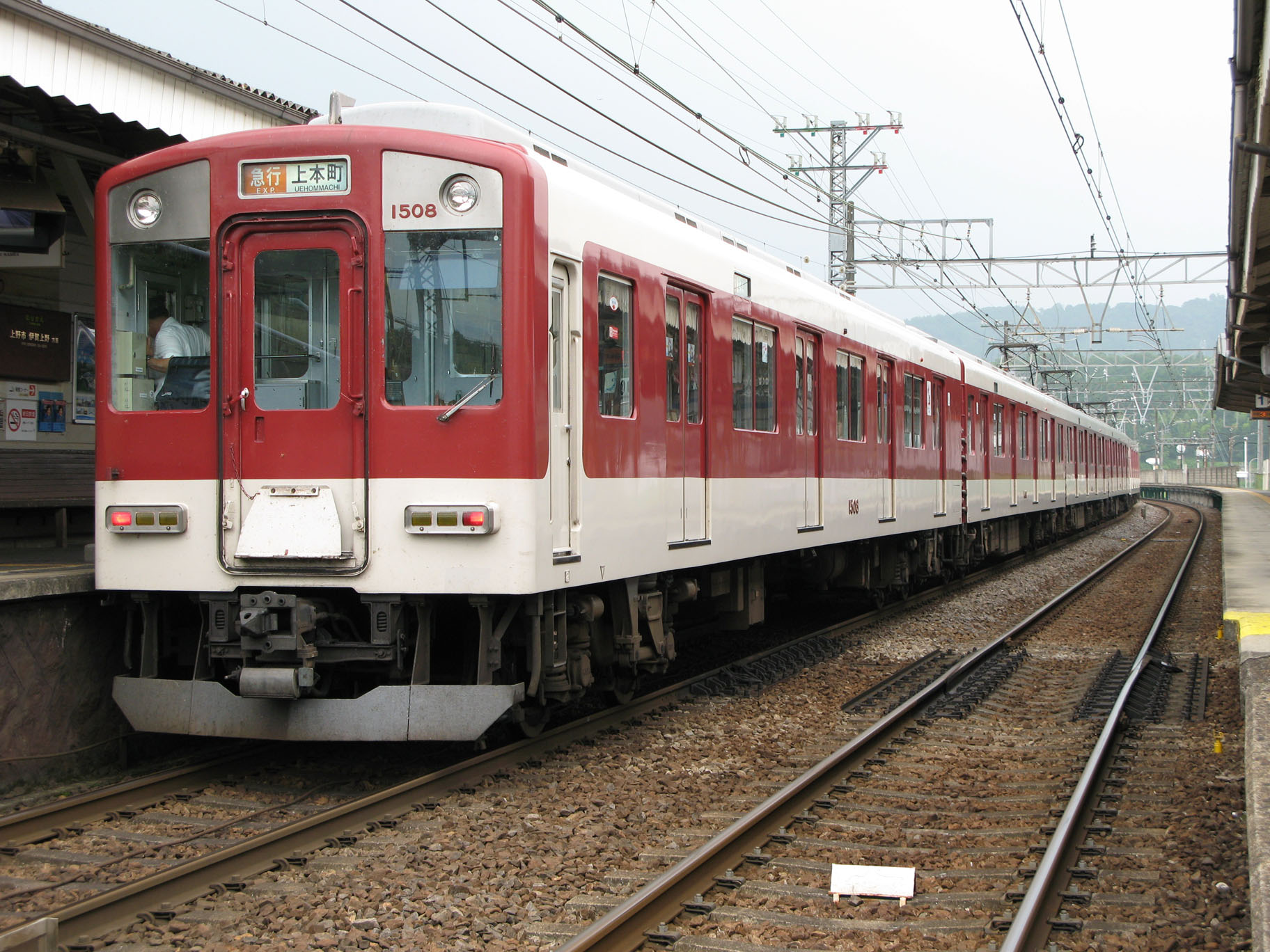
1400 series

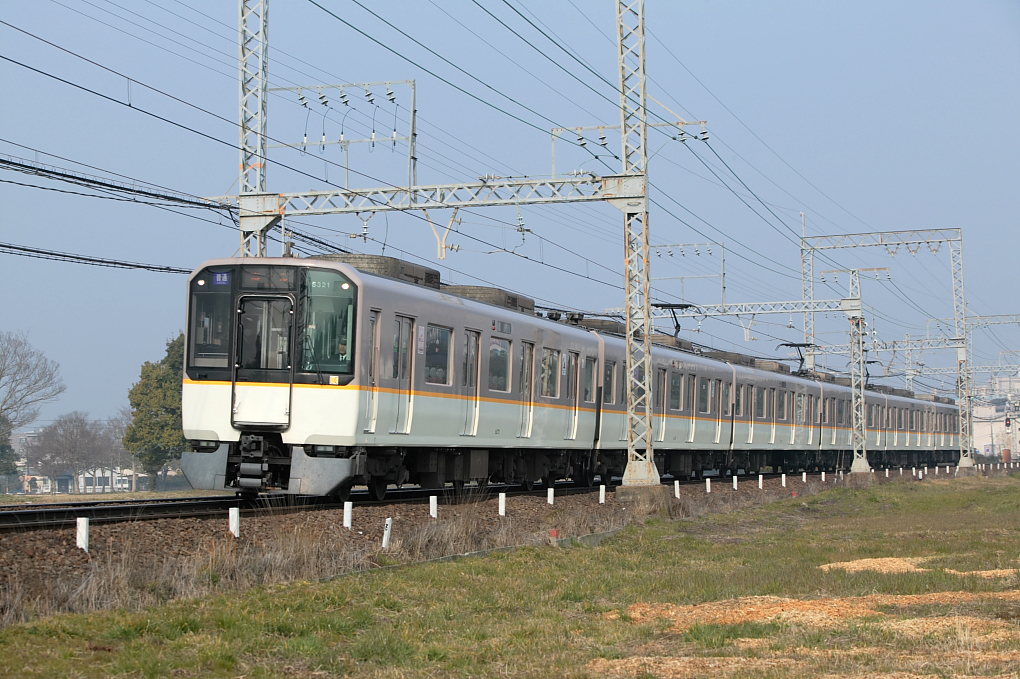
5820 series

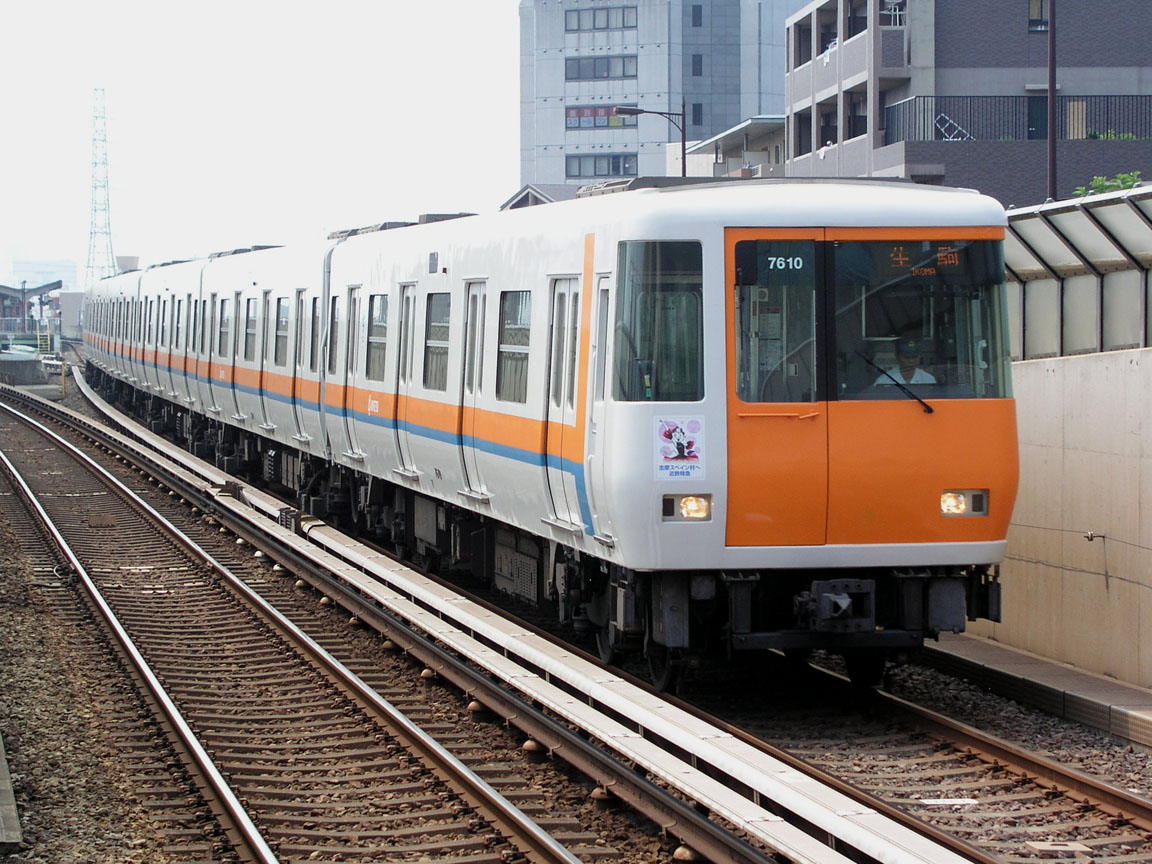
7000 series

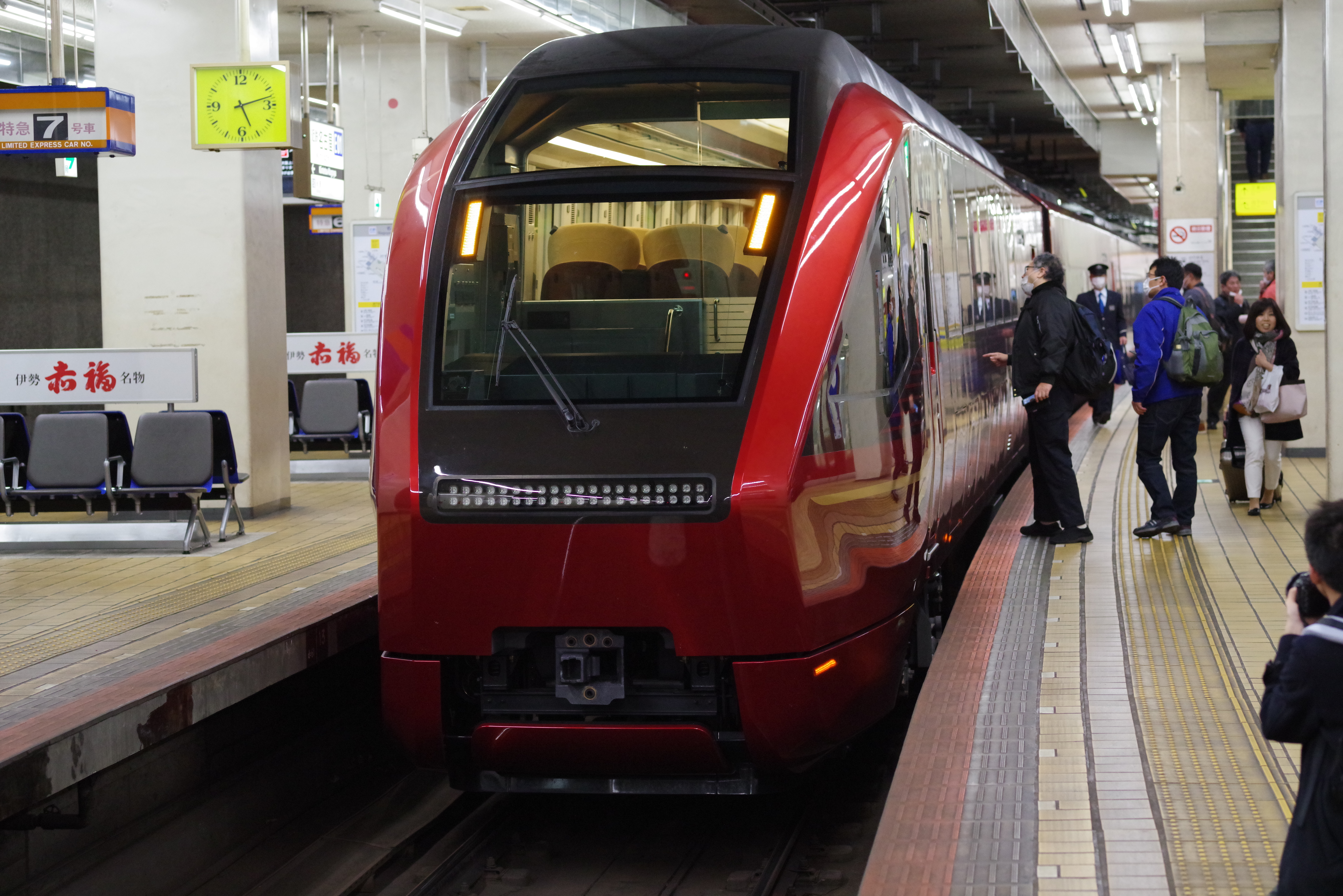
80000 series Hinotori

=== Future ===
Additional rolling stock types were announced in June 2025:

- 1B series (Osaka Line, Yamada Line, Toba Line, Nagoya Line, Yamada Line, Toba Line)
- 6A series (Minami-osaka Line, Nagano Line, Gose Line, Yoshino Line)

== Fare cards ==
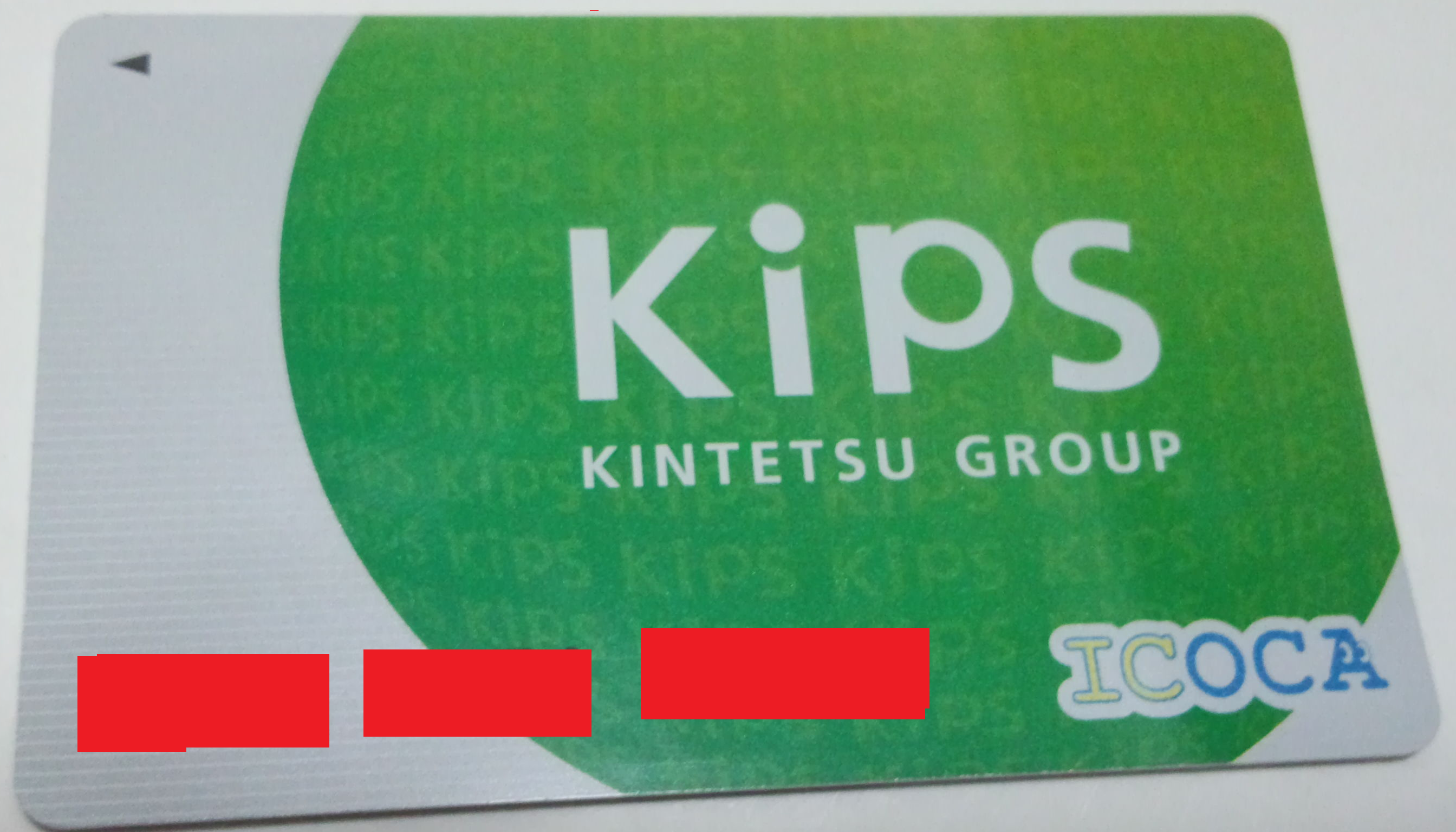
KIPS ICOCA card: the contactless smart card sold by the Kintetsu Railway

Kintetsu accepts ICOCA, PiTaPa, and other compatible nation-wide IC cards throughout their network except on the Ikoma cable car and Katsuragi ropeway. Various discount tickets are also available from their website or ticket machines, with varying valid areas and usage periods. Surutto Kansai passes can be used in the Keihanshin area, west of Aoyamachō and north of Tsubosakayama stations.

== Offices of Kintetsu ==
- Headquarters and Osaka Transportation Department, Railway Headquarters, Railway Headquarters: 1-55, Uehommachi Rokuchome, Tennoji-ku, Osaka
- Nagoya Transportation Department, Railway Headquarters: 16-11, Unomori Itchome, Yokkaichi, Mie

== See also ==
- Yamato Bunkakan
