= Timeline of Osaka =

The following is a timeline of the history of the city of Osaka, Japan.

== Prior to 19th century ==
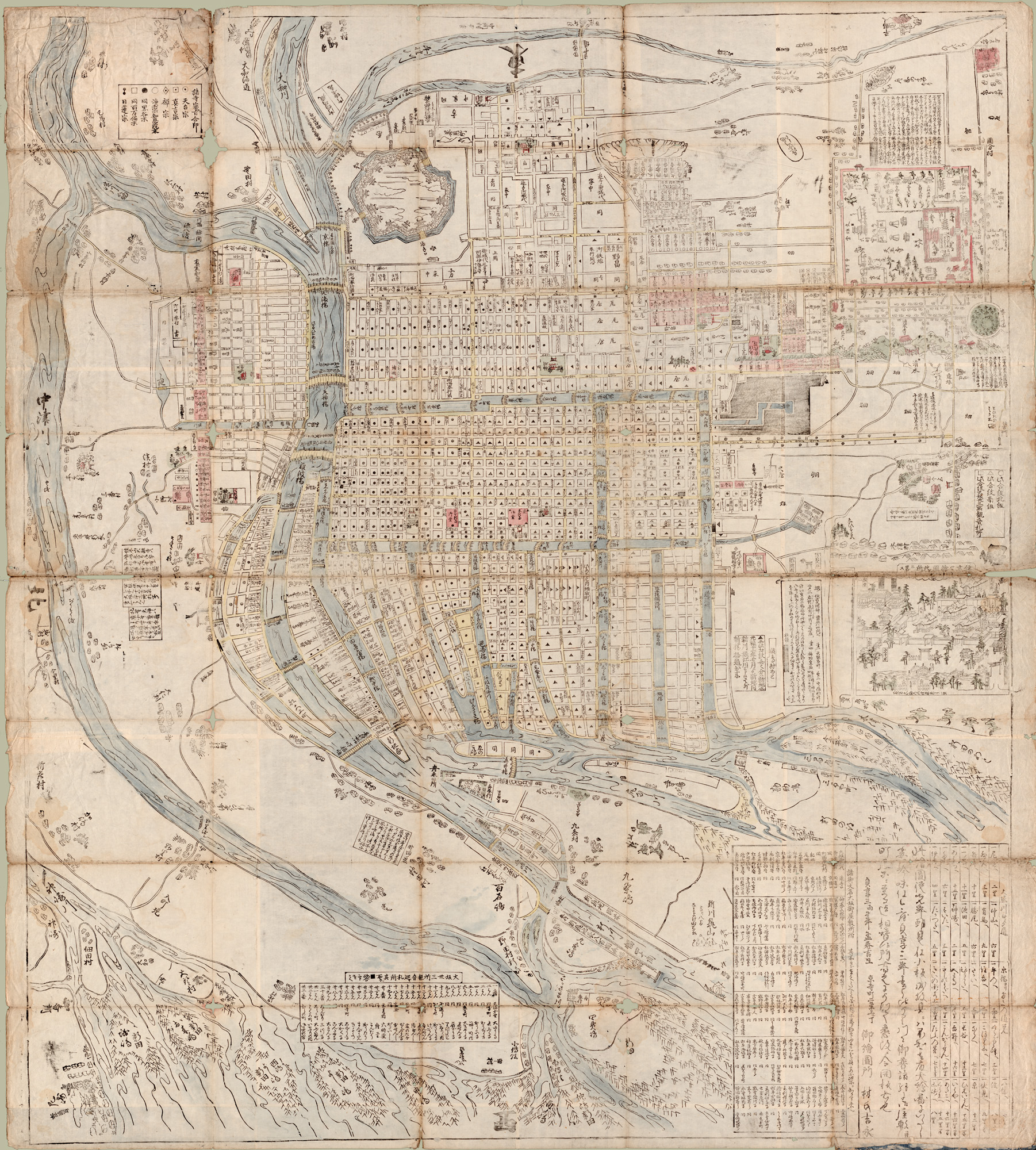
Map of Osaka in 1686 CE

- 211 CE – Sumiyoshi taisha (shrine) founded.
- 593 CE – Shitennō-ji (temples) founded.
- 645 CE – Capital of Japan relocated to Naniwa-kyō; Kōtoku in power.
- 672 – Tenmu in power.
- 724 – Shōmu in power.
- 794 – Japanese capital relocated from Naniwa to Heian-kyō.
- 1496 – Ishiyama Hongan-ji construction begins (approximate date).
- 1583 – Osaka Castle construction begins.
- 1614 – November: Siege of Osaka begins.
- 1615
  - June: Siege of Osaka ends.
  - Dōtonbori (canal) built.
- 1684 – Takemoto-za puppet theatre opens.
- 1720 – Sasa-se theatre fan club founded.
- 1724 – Kaitokudō merchant academy established.
Gallery

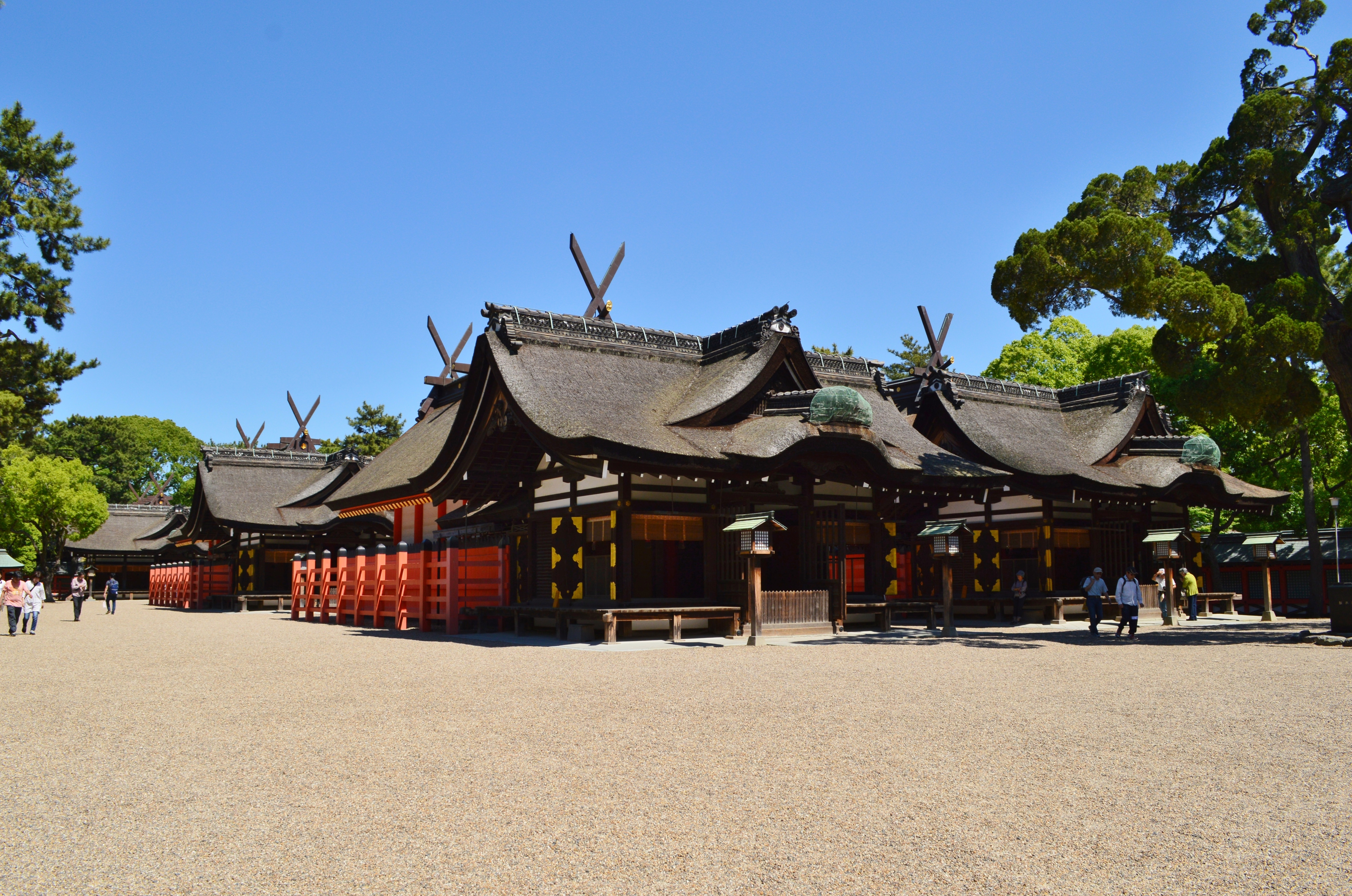
Sumiyoshi Taisha Grand Shrine

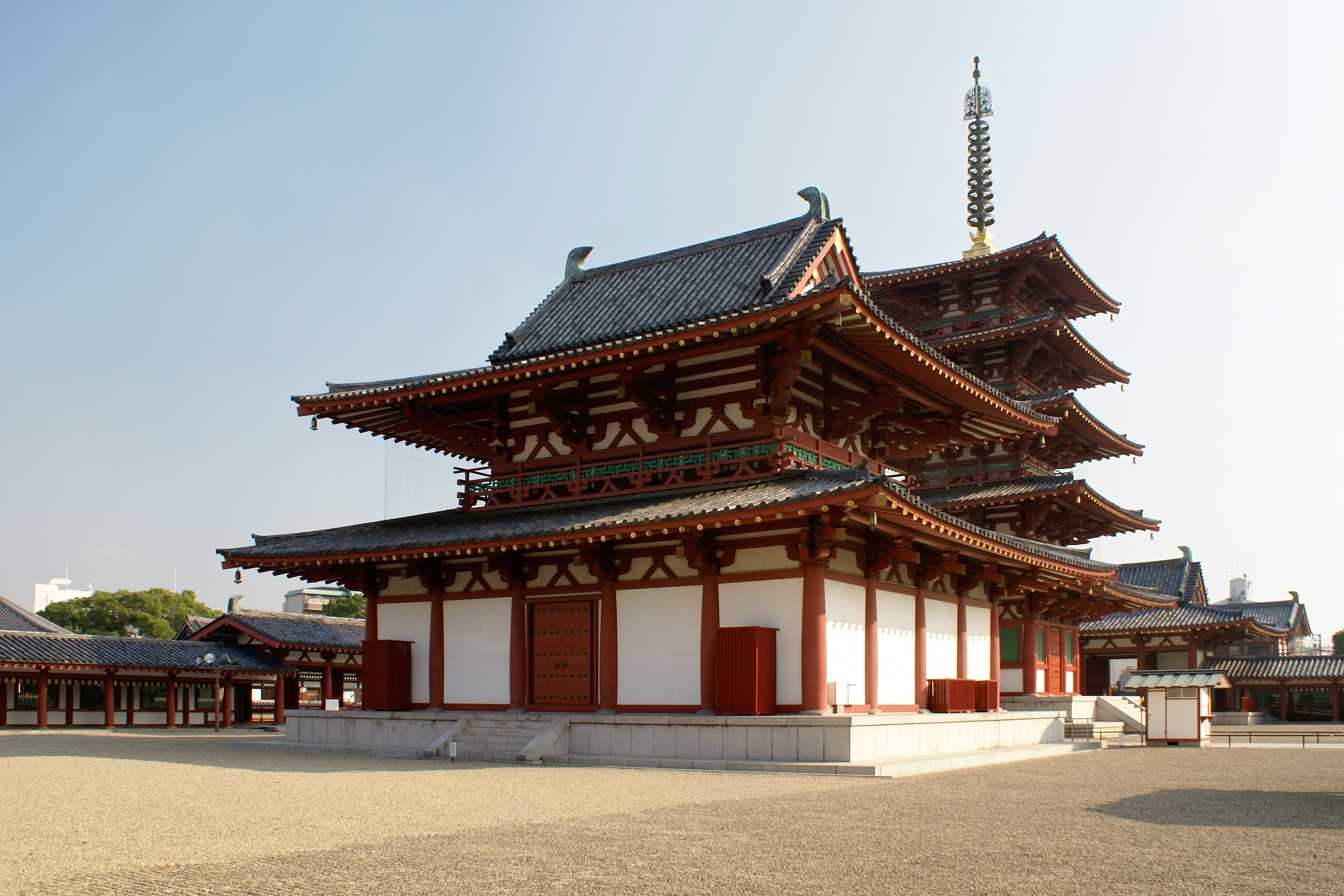
Shitennoji

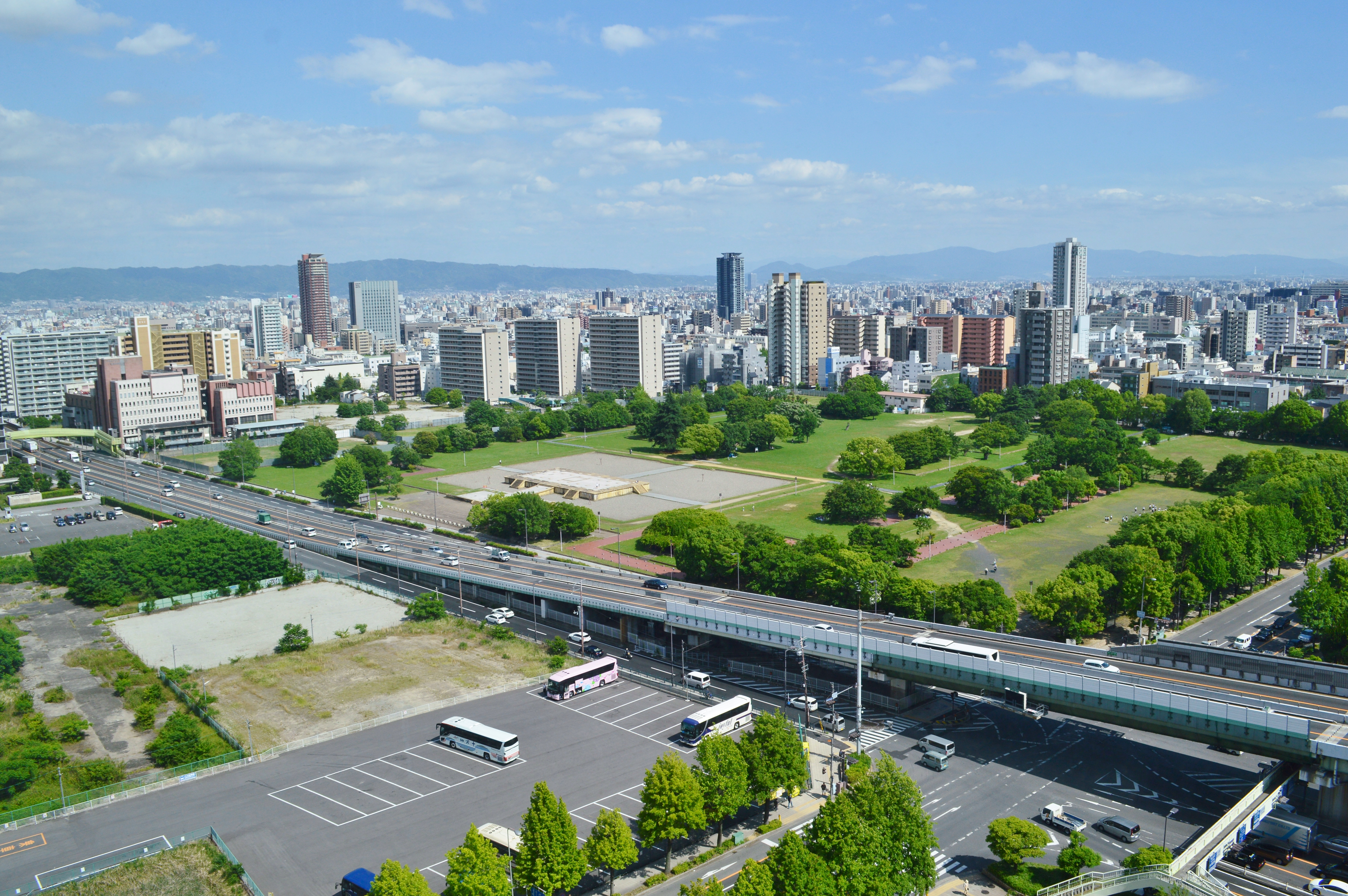
Remains of Naniwa-no-Miya Palace (2017)

== 19th century ==
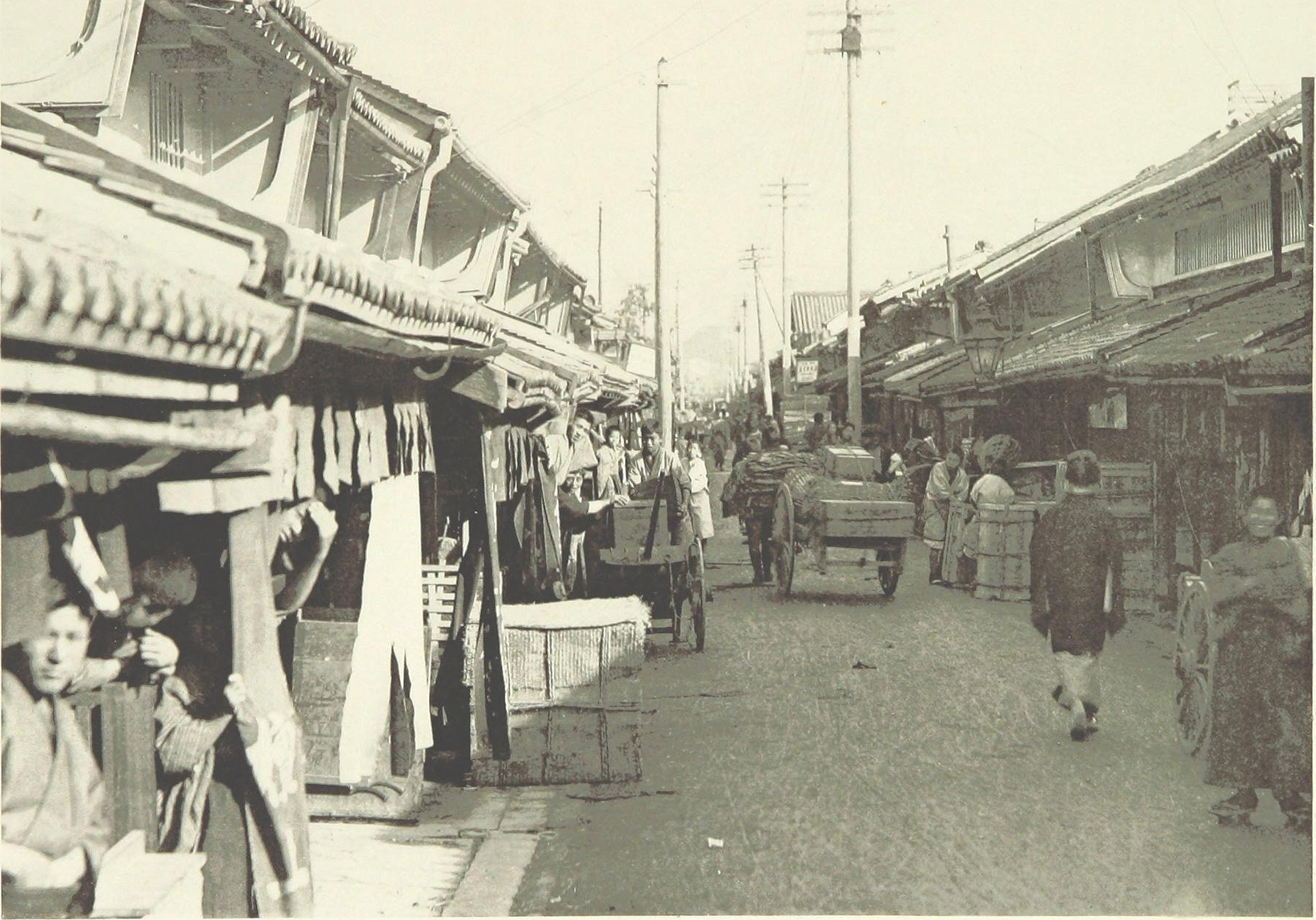
Osaka Japan in 1880s

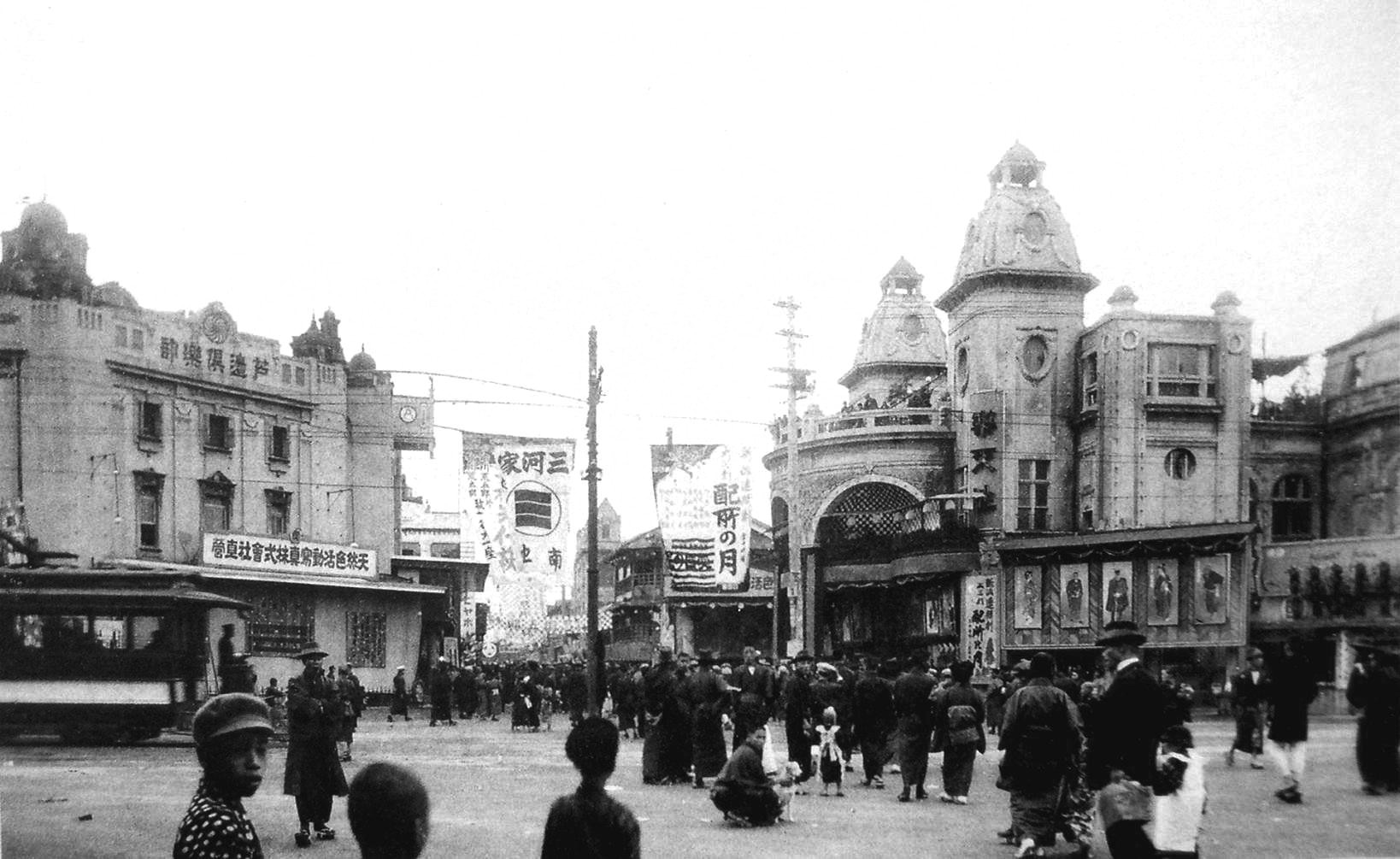
Sennichimae area in 1916

- 1805 – Bunrakuza puppet theatre opens (approximate date).
- 1837 – Economic/social unrest led by Ōshio Heihachirō.
- 1838 – Tekijuku (school) opens.
- 1868
  - European commerce begins.
  - City becomes part of Osaka Municipal Prefecture.
- 1869 – Tokyo-Osaka steamship line begins operating.
- 1871
  - Tokyo-Kyoto-Osaka postal service begins.
  - Imperial Mint built.
- 1874 – Kobe-Osaka railway begins operating; Ōsaka Station (with clocktower) opens.
- 1875 – Meiji political Osaka Conference of 1875 held.
- 1876 – Osaka Nippō (newspaper) begins publication.
- 1878 – Osaka Stock Exchange and Osaka Chamber of Commerce established.
- 1879 – Asahi Shimbun (newspaper) begins publication.
- 1880 – Osaka Commercial Training Institute established.
- 1881 – Osaka Iron Works established.
- 1882
  - Osaka Boseki Kaisha (spinning mill) in business.
  - Population: 332,425.
- 1884 – Osaka Shosen Kaisha (shipping firm) in business.
- 1887 – Population: 426,846.
- 1888 – Osaka Mainichi Shinbun (newspaper) begins publication.
- 1890 – Nakanoshima Park opens.
- 1892
  - December 20: Fire.
  - Population: 479,895.
- 1895
  - Sumitomo Bank established.
  - Kyōbashi Station built.
- 1897
  - Parts of Higashinari-gun and Nishinari-gun annexed to Osaka city.
  - Demonstration of Lumière "projected pictures" at the Nanchi Embujo theatre.
  - Population: 758,285.
- 1900 – Population: 881,344 city; 1,678,422 prefecture.

== 20th century ==
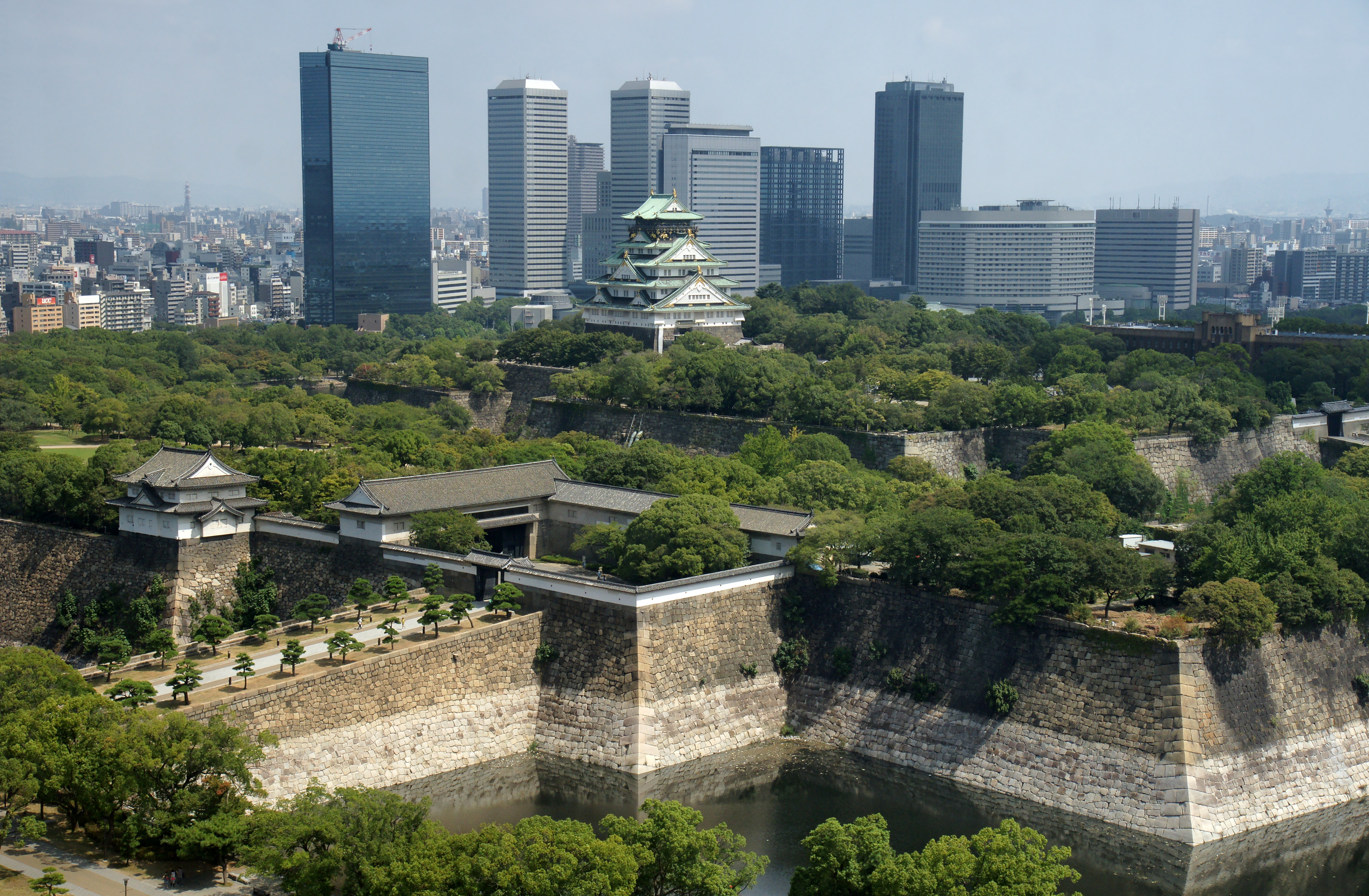
Osaka castle

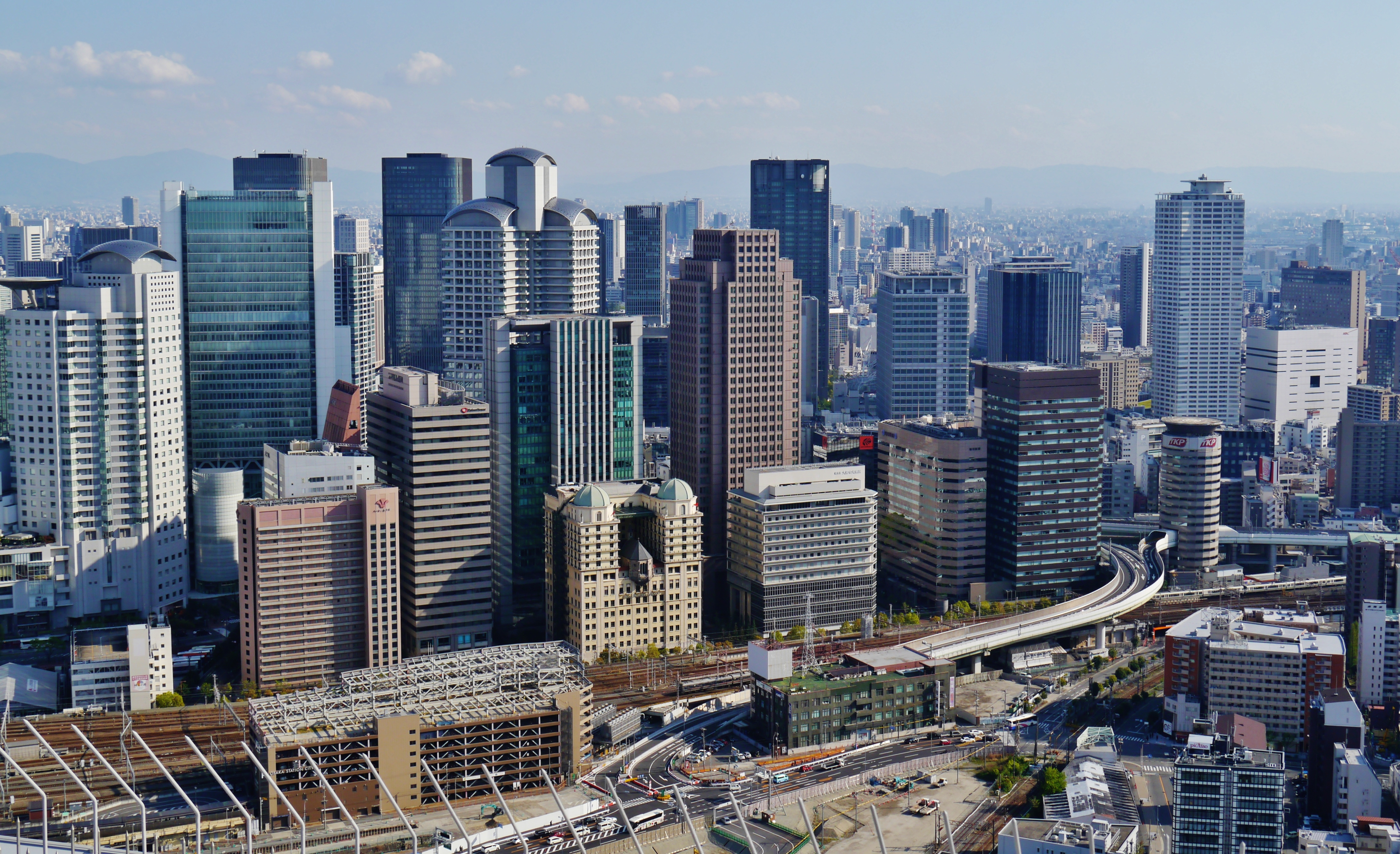
Skyscrapers in Umeda district

=== 1900s–1940s ===
- 1901 – Satirical Kokkei Shinbun begins publication.
- 1903 – National Industrial Exposition (Japan) held in Osaka.
- 1904 – Osaka Prefectural Nakanoshima Library opens.
- 1905 – Maruki-go bakery in business.
- 1909 – Tennōji Park established.
- 1910 – Population: 1,239,373 city; 2,197,201 prefecture.
- 1915 – Tennōji Zoo founded.
- 1917 – City planning committee formed.
- 1918
  - City Social Bureau established.
  - Osaka Central Public Hall built.
- 1919 – Miki Hall (concert venue) opens.
- 1920
  - Shirokiya department store built.
  - Population: 1,768,295.
- 1922 – Daimaru department store built.
- 1923
  - Sharp in business.
  - Seki Hajime becomes mayor.
- 1924 – Osaka Photographic Science Society founded.
- 1925
  - City wards established: Higashinari, Higashiyodogawa, Konohana, Minato, Naniwa, Nishinari, Nishiyodogawa, Sumiyoshi, and Tennōji.
  - "Public radio broadcasting commences."
  - Nomura Securities Co., Ltd. established.
  - Population: 2,114,804.
- 1926 – Asahi Kaikan (concert hall) opens.
- 1927 – Dojima Ohashi (bridge) built over Dojima River.
- 1928 – Osaka University of Commerce active.
- 1929
  - Kosobe Conservatory (garden) established.
  - Hankyu Department Store opens in Umeda Station.
- 1930 – Population: 2,453,573 city; 3,540,017 prefecture.
- 1931 – National Defense Women's Association founded in Osaka.
- 1932 – City wards established: Asahi and Taishō.
- 1933
  - Subway Midōsuji Line begins operating.
  - Sanwa Bank established.
- 1936
  - Osaka Tigers baseball team formed.
  - Osaka Municipal Museum of Art opens.
- 1940
  - January 28: Train crash at Ajikawaguchi Station.
  - Population: 3,252,340 city; 4,843,032 prefecture.
- 1942
  - Osaka Shimbun (newspaper) in publication.
  - Subway Yotsubashi Line begins operating.
- 1943
  - City wards established: Abeno, Fukushima, Higashisumiyoshi, Ikuno, Jōtō, and Miyakojima.
  - Hitachi Zosen Corporation in business.
- 1945
  - March 13: Bombing of Osaka during World War II begins.
  - August 14: Bombing of Osaka ends.
  - Population: 1,102,959.
  - Osaka Municipal Transportation Bureau established.
- 1947
  - Kansai Symphony Orchestra founded.
  - Population: 1,559,310.
- 1948 – Grand Sumo tournament begins.
- 1949 – Osaka City University and Osaka Securities Exchange active.

=== 1950s–1990s ===
- 1950 – Population: 1,956,136.
- 1955
  - Cinerama Gekijo opens.
  - Sankei Sports newspaper begins publication.
  - Population: 2,547,321.
- 1956
  - Tsūtenkaku (tower) built.
  - Osaka designated a government ordinance city.
- 1957 – Sister city relationship established with San Francisco, USA.
- 1958 – Radio Osaka begins broadcasting.
- 1961
  - September: Typhoon Muroto II occurs.
  - Subway Chūō Line begins operating.
- 1964
  - Tokyo-Osaka Tōkaidō Shinkansen (hi-speed train) begins operating.
  - Nagai Stadium opens.
- 1967 – Subway Tanimachi Line begins operating.
- 1968 – Osaka Sports newspaper in publication.
- 1969 – Subway Sakaisuji Line and Sennichimae Line begin operating.
- 1970
  - April: Gas explosion in Kita-ku.
  - Expo '70 (world's fair) held in Osaka.
- 1972
  - May 13: Sennichi Department Store Building fire.
  - Osaka Expo '70 Stadium opens.
- 1974 – City wards established: Hirano, Suminoe, Tsurumi, and Yodogawa.
- 1975 – Population: 2,780,000.
- 1977 – National Museum of Art, Osaka opens.
- 1979 – Capsule Inn Osaka in business.
- 1980 – Osaka Symphony Orchestra established.
- 1982
  - Osaka International Ladies Marathon begins.
  - Museum of Oriental Ceramics, Osaka established.
- 1983 – Osaka-jō Hall (arena) opens.
- 1984 – National Bunraku Theatre opens.
- 1987 – Kincho Stadium opens.
- 1989
  - City wards established: Chūō and Kita.
  - Osaka Science Museum opens.
- 1990
  - Subway Nagahori Tsurumi-ryokuchi Line begins operating.
  - Osaka Aquarium Kaiyukan opens.
  - Garden and Greenery Exposition held in city.
- 1993 – Umeda Sky Building constructed.
- 1994 – Kansai International Airport opens.
- 1995
  - January 17: The 6.9 M_{w} Great Hanshin earthquake shakes the southern Hyōgo Prefecture with a maximum Shindo of VII, leaving 5,502–6,434 people dead, and 251,301–310,000 displaced in the region.
  - Takafumi Isomura becomes mayor.
- 1996 – Osaka Prefectural Central Library opens.
- 1997 – Tempozan Ferris Wheel and Kyocera Dome open.
- 1999 – Momofuku Ando Instant Ramen Museum opens in nearby Ikeda.

== 21st century ==
- 2001
  - March 31: Universal Studios Japan opens.
  - June 8: Ikeda school massacre occurs in nearby Ikeda.
- 2006 – Subway Imazatosuji Line begins operating.
- 2007 – Kunio Hiramatsu becomes mayor.
- 2009 – Kansai Music Conference begins.
- 2010 – Population: 2,665,314.
- 2011 – Tōru Hashimoto becomes mayor.
- 2013 – Festival Hall opens.
- 2014 – Population: 2,685,218.
- 2021 – December 17: A fire occurs in Kita ward.
- 2025 – Expo 2025 held in city.

== See also ==
- Osaka history
- Osaka history (in Japanese; includes timeline)
- List of mayors of Osaka

== Bibliography ==
Published in the 19th century

- Philipp Franz von Siebold (1841). "(Ohosaka)". Manners and Customs of the Japanese, in the Nineteenth Century. London: John Murray. hdl:2027/hvd.hw26ti – via HathiTrust.

Published in the 20th century

- "Osaka". Guide Book for Tourists in Japan. Yokohama: Obun Printing Co. 1903.
- Souvenir Guide to Osaka and the Fifth National Industrial Exhibition. Hakurankwai Kyosankwai. 1903.
- "Osaka" . Encyclopædia Britannica. Vol. 20 (11th ed.). 1910. p. 344.
- "Osaka (Settsu)", Handbook for Travellers in Japan (9th ed.), London: J. Murray, 1913, hdl:2027/nnc1.50290956
- T. Philip Terry (1914), "Osaka", Terry's Japanese Empire, Boston: Houghton Mifflin, LCCN 14005129
- Robert P. Porter (1915), "The Larger Cities: Osaka", Japan, the New World-Power (2nd ed.), London: Oxford University Press
- Claudius Madrolle (1916). "Osaka". Chine du Sud, Java, Japon (in French) (2nd ed.). Paris: Hachette. hdl:2027/uc1.$b193211.
- Osaka-fu tokeisho: 1940 [Osaka Prefecture Statistics] (in Japanese), Osaka-fu, 1941
- W.A. Robson, ed. (1954). "Tokyo and Osaka". Great Cities of the World: their Government, Politics and Planning. Routledge. pp. 719–754. ISBN 978-1-135-67247-8.
- William B. Hauser (1977), "Osaka: A Commercial City in Tokugawa Japan", Urbanism Past and Present, 5, ISSN 0160-2780
- S. Matsudaira (1984). "Hiiki Renchū (Theatre Fan Clubs) in Osaka in the Early Nineteenth Century". Modern Asian Studies. 18 (4): 699–709. doi:10.1017/s0026749x00016395. JSTOR 312345. S2CID 143950026.
- Albert Altman (1990). "The proprietors assert themselves: the Osaka Asahi shinbun and the Osaka Mainichi shinbun in the late nineteenth century". In Peter Lowe and Herman Moeshart (ed.). Western Interactions With Japan: Expansions, the Armed Forces and Readjustment 1859–1956. Japan Library. ISBN 978-1-135-88102-3.
- Kuniko Fujita and Richard Child Hill, ed. (1993). "Osaka and Tokyo Compared". Japanese Cities. USA: Temple University Press. ISBN 978-1-4399-0092-5.
- Schellinger and Salkin, ed. (1996). "Osaka". International Dictionary of Historic Places: Asia and Oceania. UK: Routledge. p. 648+. ISBN 9781884964046.
- James L. McClain and Wikita Osamu, ed. (1999). "Chronology". Osaka: The Merchants' Capital of Early Modern Japan. Cornell University Press. ISBN 0-8014-3630-3.
- Ian Martin Röpke (1999). Historical Dictionary of Osaka and Kyoto. Historical Dictionaries of Cities of the World. Maryland, USA: Scarecrow Press. ISBN 978-0-8108-3622-8.

Published in the 21st century

- Carl Mosk (2001). "Manchester of the Far East". Japanese Industrial History: Technology, Urbanization, and Economic Growth. M.E. Sharpe. ISBN 978-0-7656-3855-7.
- Blair A. Ruble (2001). Second Metropolis: Pragmatic Pluralism in Gilded Age Chicago, Silver Age Moscow, and Meiji Osaka. Cambridge University Press. ISBN 978-0-521-80179-9.
- Jeffrey E. Hanes (2002). The City As Subject: Seki Hajime and the Reinvention of Modern Osaka. University of California Press. ISBN 978-0-520-92683-7.
- Richard Tames (2008). "Historical Gazetteer: Osaka". A Traveller's History of Japan (4th ed.). USA: Interlink Books. ISBN 978-1-56656-404-5.
- Hugh Cortazzi, ed. (2012). "Osaka". Victorians in Japan: In and Around the Treaty Ports. Bloomsbury. pp. 137–. ISBN 978-1-78093-977-3. (first published in 1987)
