= Daidō-Toyosato Station =

Metro station in Osaka, Japan

Coordinates: 34.7438°N 135.5444°E

Daidō-Toyosato Station だいどう豊里駅
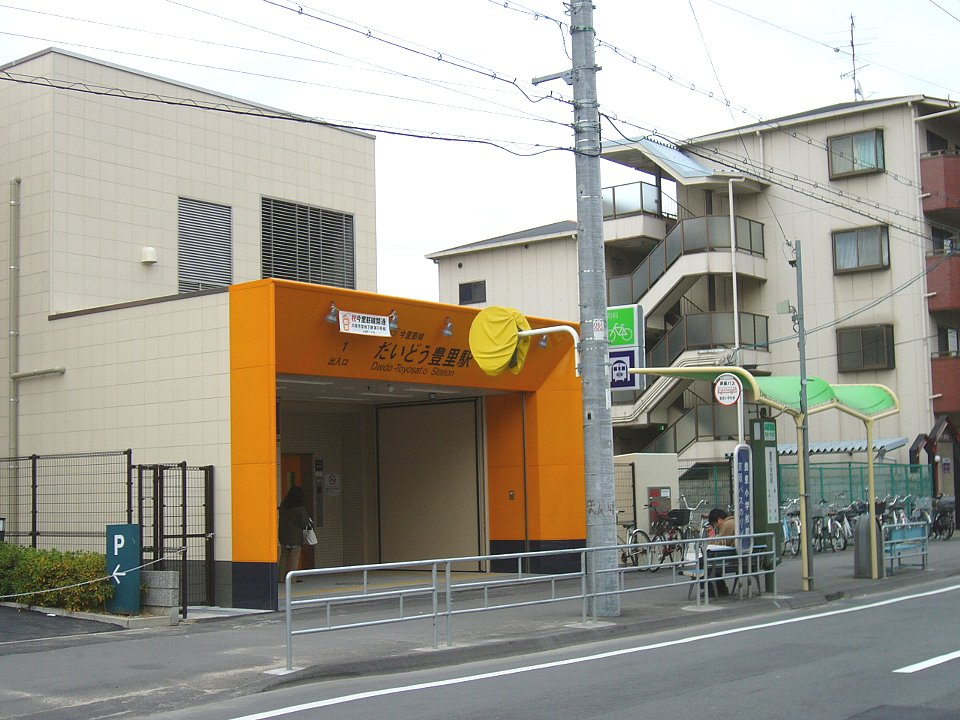
- Entrance No. 1

General information
- Location: Higashiyodogawa, Osaka, Osaka; Japan
- System: Osaka Metro
- Operator: Osaka Metro
- Line: Imazatosuji Line
- Platforms: 1 island platform
- Tracks: 2

Construction
- Structure type: Underground
- Accessible: Yes

Other information
- Station code: I 13

History
- Opened: 24 December 2006; 19 years ago

Services
Preceding station	Osaka Metro	Following station
Zuikō Yonchōme I 12 towards Itakano	Imazatosuji Line	Taishibashi-Imaichi I 14 towards Imazato
Location
- Location within Osaka Prefecture Location within Japan

Daido-Toyosato Station (だいどう豊里駅, Daidō-Toyosato-eki) is a metro station on the Osaka Metro Imazatosuji Line in Higashiyodogawa-ku, Osaka, Japan.

== Lines ==
- Osaka Metro
  - Imazatosuji Line (Station Number: I13)

== Layout ==
- There is an island platform with two tracks underground. The platform is fenced with platform gates.

1	■ Imazatosuji Line	for Taishibashi-Imaichi, Gamo Yonchome, Midoribashi and Imazato
2	■ Imazatosuji Line	for Itakano
