= Zuikō Yonchōme Station =

Metro station in Osaka, Japan

Coordinates: 34°45′8.36″N 135°32′40.62″E

Zuikō Yonchōme Station 瑞光四丁目駅
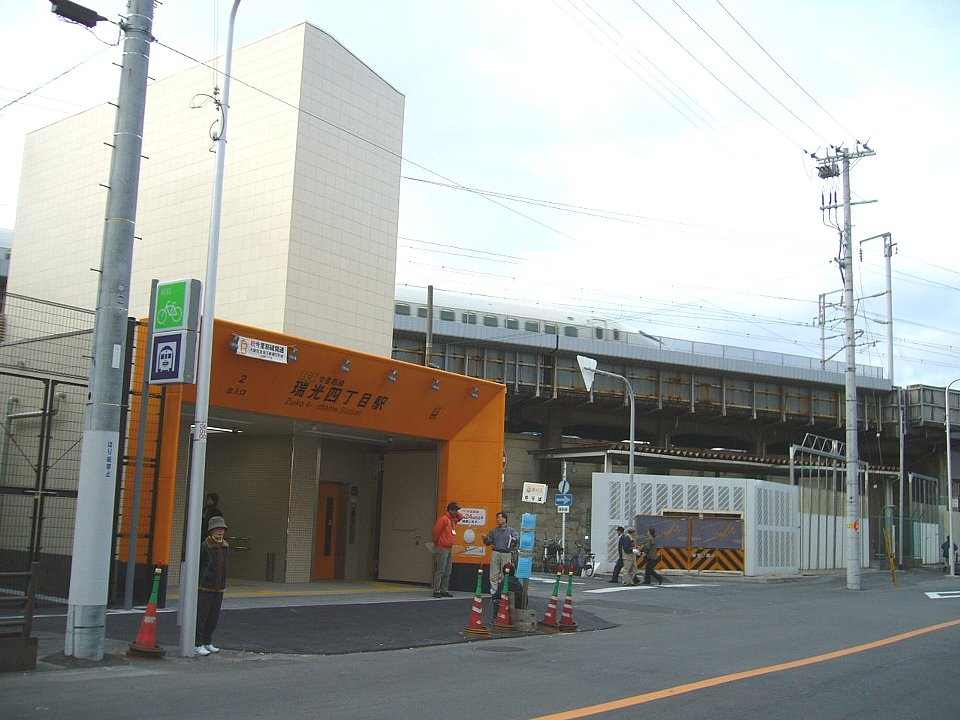
- Exit 2

General information
- Location: Higashiyodogawa, Osaka, Osaka; Japan
- System: Osaka Metro
- Operator: Osaka Metro
- Line: Imazatosuji Line
- Platforms: 1 island platform
- Tracks: 2

Construction
- Structure type: Underground

Other information
- Station code: I 12

History
- Opened: 24 December 2006; 19 years ago

Services
Preceding station	Osaka Metro	Following station
Itakano I 11 Terminus	Imazatosuji Line	Daidō-Toyosato I 13 towards Imazato
Location
- Location within Osaka Prefecture Location within Japan

Zuiko Yonchome Station (瑞光四丁目駅, Zuikō Yonchōme-eki; station number: I12) is a train station on the Osaka Metro Imazatosuji Line in Higashiyodogawa-ku, Osaka, Japan. It is one of two nearest stations to Osaka University of Economics as well as Kami-Shinjo Station on the Hankyu Railway Kyoto Line.

== Layout ==
- There is an island platform with two tracks underground. The platform is fenced with platform gates.

1	■ Imazatosuji Line	for Taishibashi-Imaichi, Gamo Yonchome, Midoribashi and Imazato
2	■ Imazatosuji Line	to Itakano
