= Shigino Station =

Railway and metro station in Osaka, Japan

Coordinates: 34.6926°N 135.5453°E

Shigino Station 鴫野駅
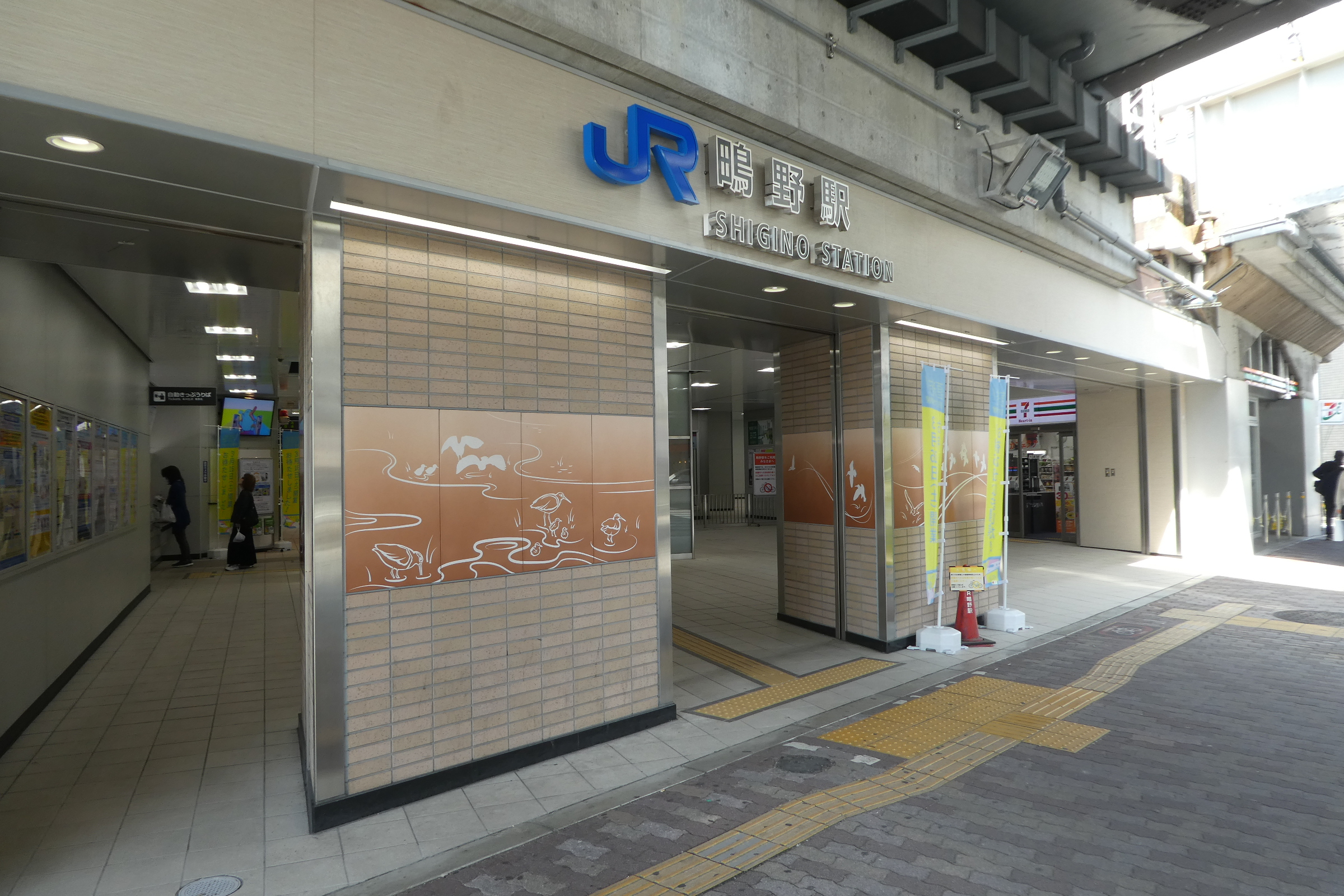
- JR West station entrance, March 2019

General information
- Location: Jōtō, Osaka, Osaka; Japan
- System: JR West/Osaka Metro station
- Operator: JR West; Osaka Metro
- Lines: H Katamachi Line (Gakkentoshi Line); F Osaka Higashi Line; Imazatosuji Line

Other information
- Station code: JR-H40 (Gakkentoshi Line); JR-F07 (Osaka Higashi Line); I 19 (Imazatosuji Line)

History
- Opened: 1933 (Gakkentoshi Line); 2006 (Osaka Metro Imazatosuji Line)

Services
Preceding station	Osaka Metro	Following station
Gamō Yonchōme I 18 towards Itakano	Imazatosuji Line	Midoribashi I 20 towards Imazato
Location
- Location within Osaka Prefecture Location within Japan

Shigino Station (鴫野駅, Shigino-eki) is a railway station on the Osaka Metro Imazatosuji Line and the West Japan Railway Company (JR West) Katamachi Line (Gakkentoshi Line) and Osaka Higashi Line in Jōtō-ku, Osaka, Japan.

== Lines ==
- JR West
  - Katamachi Line (Gakkentoshi Line)
  - Osaka Higashi Line
- Osaka Metro Imazatosuji Line (Station Number: I19)

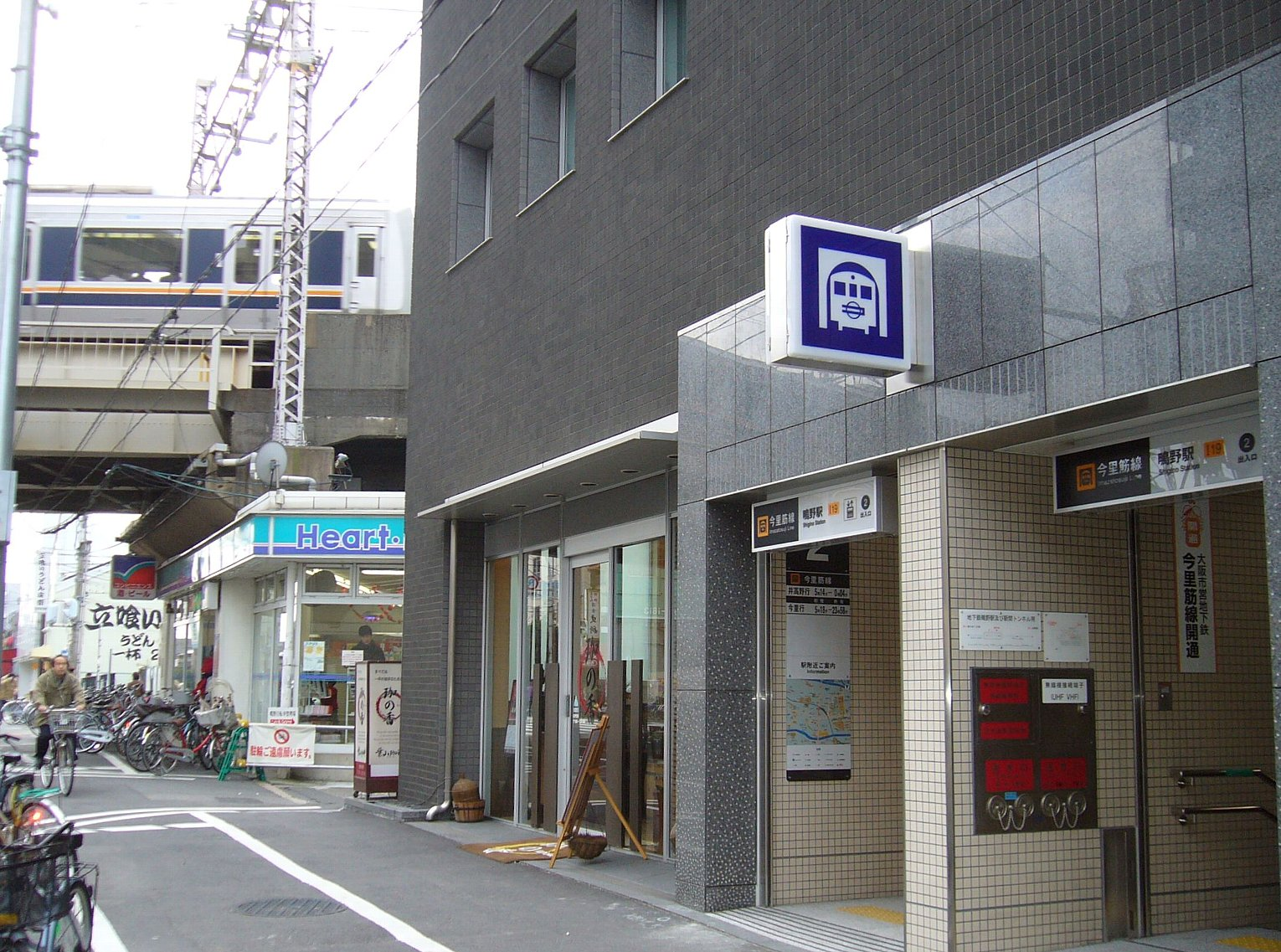
Imazatosuji Line entrance (December 2006)

== Layout ==
=== JR West ===
There are two side platforms with an island platform sandwiched in the middle. Formerly, the Gakkentoshi Line used platforms 1 and 2, but those platforms are now used for the Osaka Higashi Line, with the former using newly built platforms 3 and 4.

1	■ Osaka Higashi Line	for Hanaten and Kyūhōji
2	■ Osaka Higashi Line	for Shin-Ōsaka and Ōsaka
3	■ Gakkentoshi Line	for Shijonawate and Matsuiyamate
4	■ Gakkentoshi Line	for Kyōbashi, Kitashinchi and Amagasaki

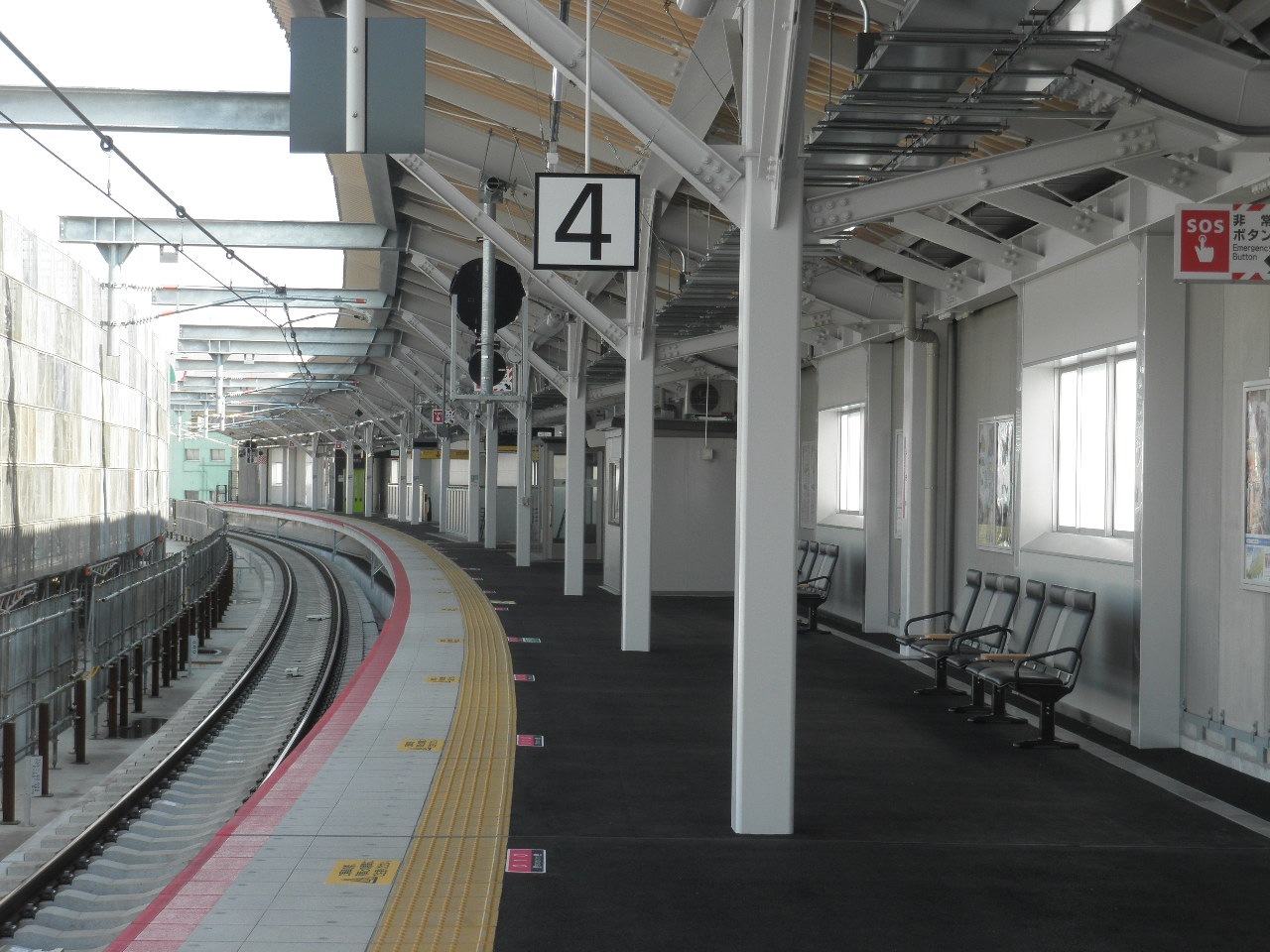
Platform 4 (Osaka Higashi Line)

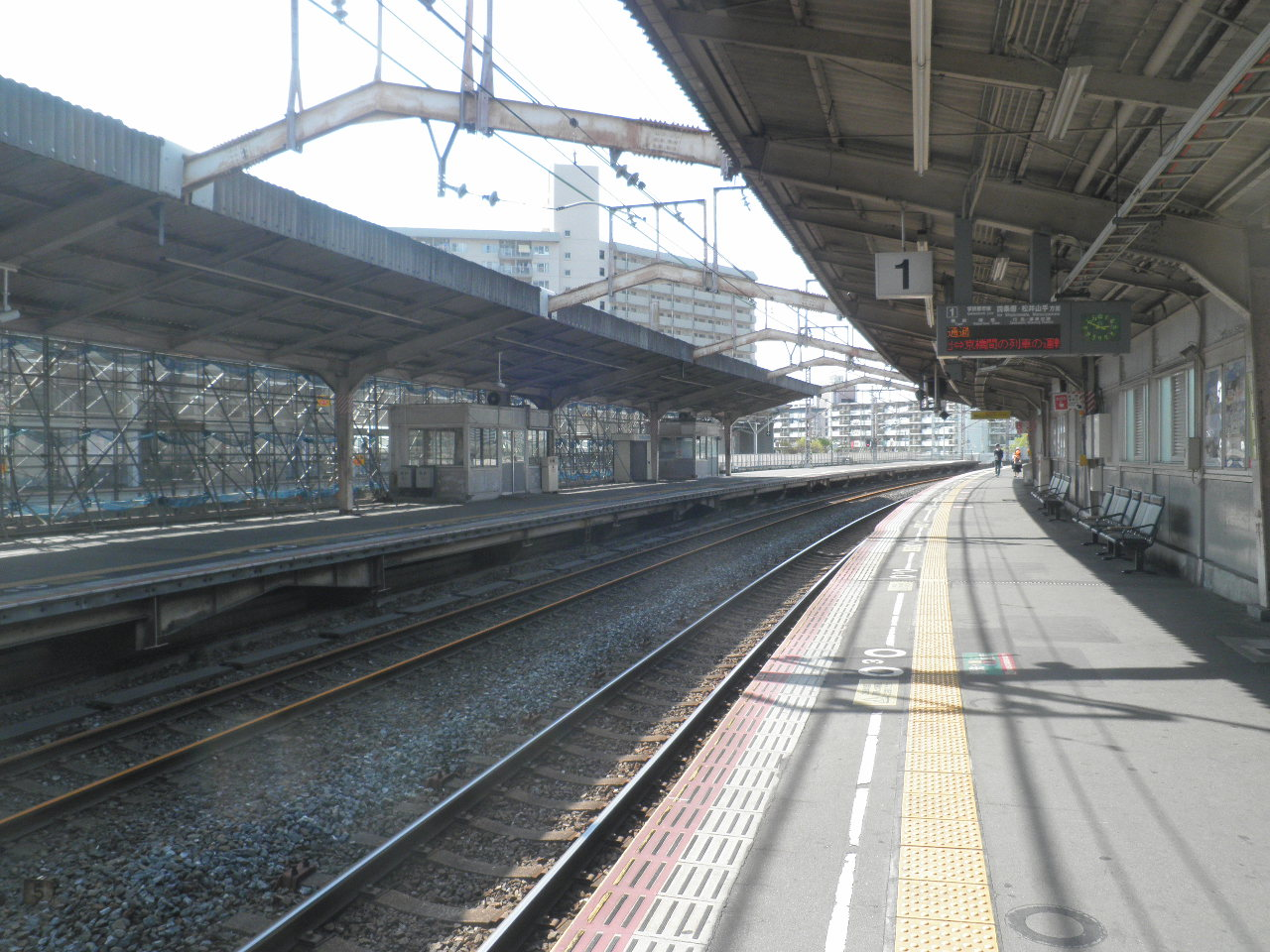
Platforms 1 and 2 (Gakkentoshi Line)

=== Osaka Metro ===
There is an island platform with two tracks underground. The platform is fenced with platform gates.

1	■ Imazatosuji Line	for Midoribashi and Imazato
2	■ Imazatosuji Line	for Gamo Yonchome, Taishibashi-Imaichi and Itakano

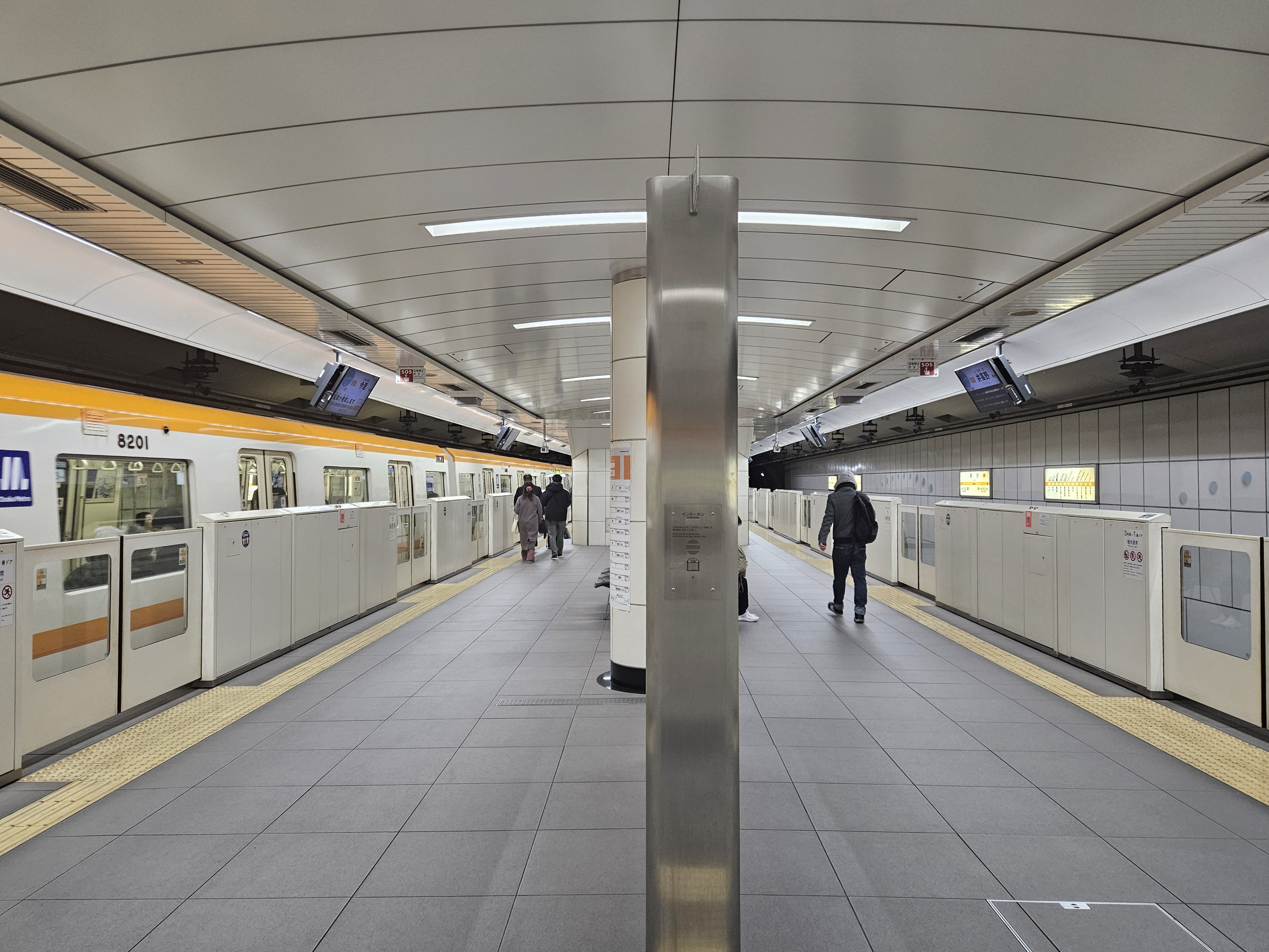
Platforms 1 and 2 (Imazatosuji Line)

== History ==
The station numbering was introduced in March 2018 with Shigino being assigned station number JR-H40.

The platforms of the Gakkentoshi Line were moved to new tracks in 2019 to make way for the opening of the second phase of the Osaka-Higashi Line.

== Adjacent stations ==
«	Service	»
JR West
Katamachi Line (Gakkentoshi Line)
Hanaten	Local	Kyōbashi
Regional Rapid Service: Does not stop at this station
Rapid Service: Does not stop at this station
Osaka Higashi Line
JR-Noe	Local	Hanaten
Suita	Freight services	Hanaten
Direct Rapid Service: Does not stop at this station
