= Jōtō-ku =

Ward of Osaka, Japan

Coordinates: 34°42′7″N 135°32′46″E

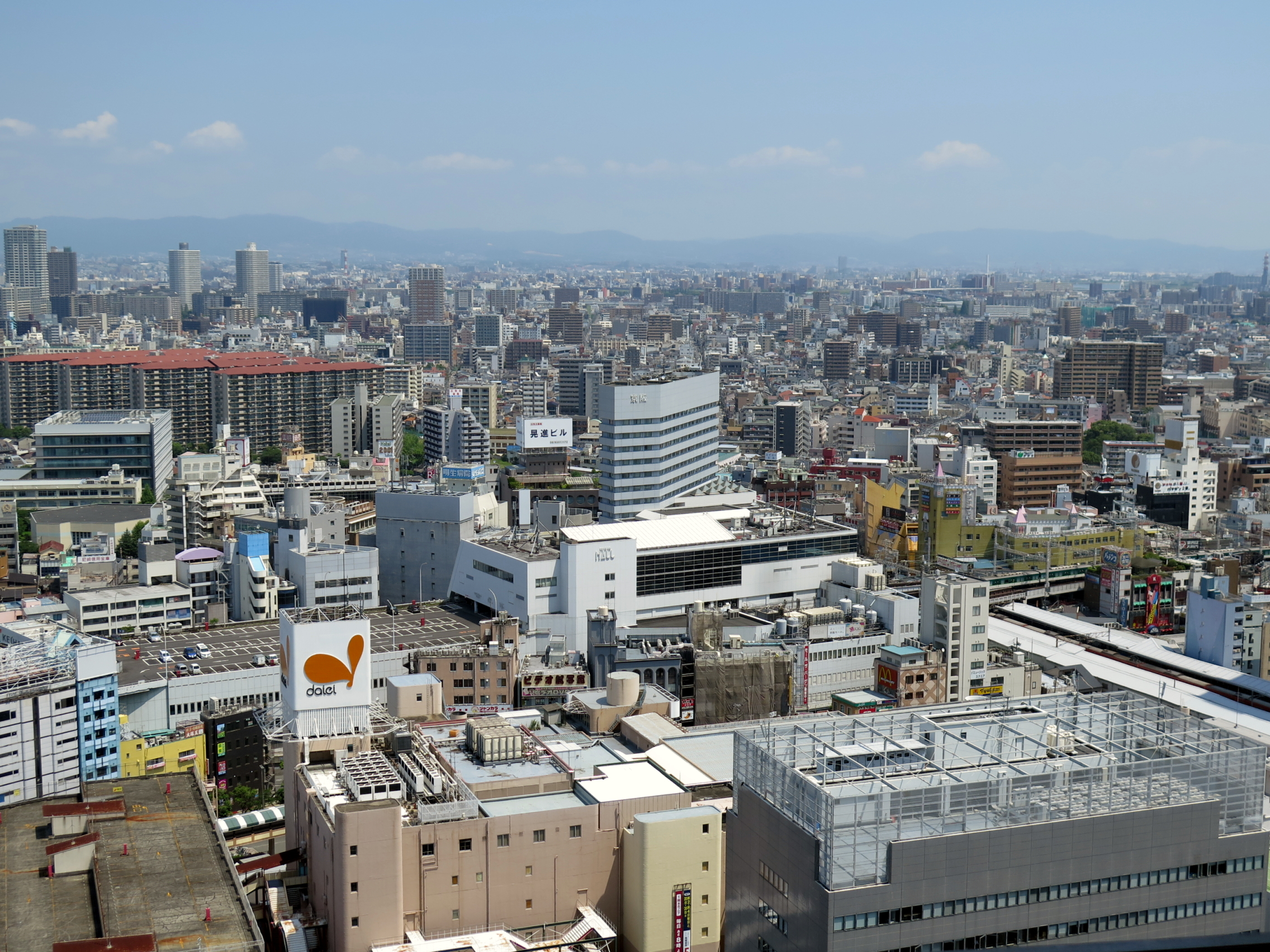
Jōtō-ku in 2014

Location of Jōtō-ku in the city of Osaka

Jōtō-ku (城東区, Jōtō-ku) is one of the 24 wards of Osaka, Japan. "Jōtō" literally means "east of the castle", referring to Osaka Castle. It was separated from Higashinari and Asahi in 1943, and eastern Jōtō became Tsurumi in 1974.

As of 2025, the population density is the second largest of a city-designated municipality in Japan, after Nishi Ward. Additionally, when the special wards of Tokyo are also included, it is the eighth densest ward overall after Toshima, Nakano, Sumida, Arakawa, Bunkyō and Taitō. In recent years, the construction of high-rise condominiums in the western and northern areas of Jōtō-ku has contributed to a steady population increase.

== Education ==
Colleges and universities

- Osaka Shin-ai College Joto Campus

Private schools

- Osaka Shin-Ai Jogakuin (girls' school from preschool to senior high school)

== Transportation ==
=== Rail ===
- West Japan Railway Company (JR West)
  - Osaka Loop Line: Kyōbashi Station - Ōsakajōkōen Station
  - JR Tōzai Line / Katamachi Line (Gakkentoshi Line): Kyōbashi Station - Shigino Station
  - Osaka Higashi Line: JR-Noe Station - Shigino Station
- Osaka Metro
  - Tanimachi Line: Noe-Uchindai Station - Sekime-Takadono Station
  - Nagahori Tsurumi-ryokuchi Line: Gamō-yonchōme Station - Imafuku-Tsurumi Station
  - Imazatosuji Line: Midoribashi Station - Shigino Station - Gamō-yonchōme Station - Sekime-Seiiku Station - Shimmori-Furuichi Station
  - Chūō Line: Fukaebashi Station
- Keihan Electric Railway
  - Keihan Main Line: Noe Station - Sekime Station
