= Osaka Institute of Technology Junior College =

- 大阪工業大学短期大学部
- Type: Private
- Active: 1950–2007
- Location: Asahi-ku, Osaka, Japan

Osaka Institute of Technology Junior College (大阪工業大学短期大学部, Osaka Kōgyō Daigaku Tanki Daigakubu) was a junior college in Asahi-ku, Osaka, Japan, and was part of the Osaka Institute of Technology network.

The Junior College was founded in 1950 as daytime course.
