= Higashinari-ku =

Higashinari-ku 東成区
- Ward
- Higashinari-ku Ward
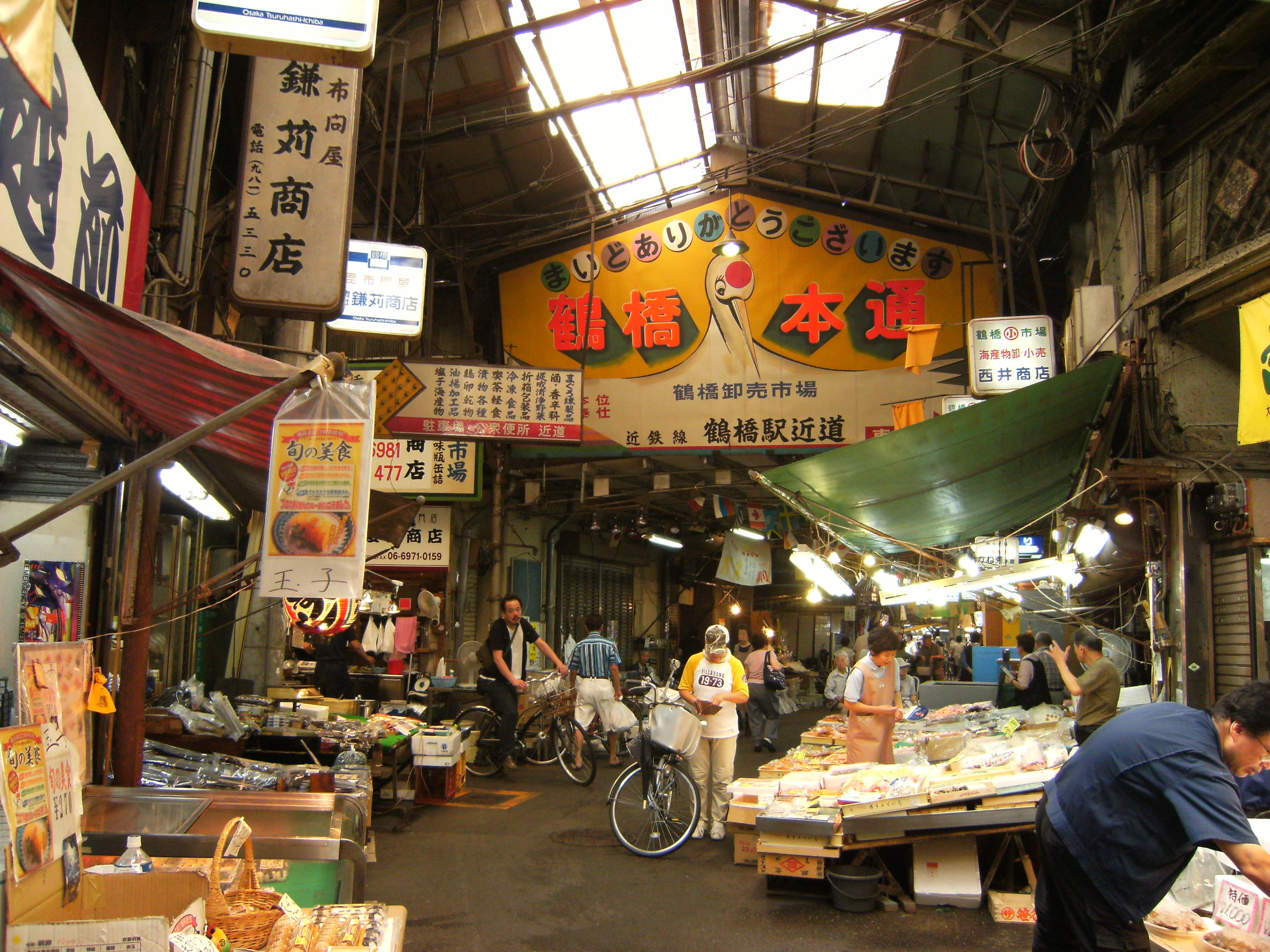
- Tsuruhashi Shopping Street in 2010

- Location of Higashinari-ku in Osaka

- Coordinates: 34°40′22″N 135°32′48″E
- Country: Japan
- Region: Kansai
- Prefecture: Osaka
- City: Osaka

Area
  - Total: 4.55 km^{2} (1.76 sq mi)

Population (September 2010)
  - Total: 79,435
  - Density: 17,500/km^{2} (45,200/sq mi)
- Time zone: UTC+9 (Japan Standard Time)

Higashinari-ku (東成区) is one of 24 wards of Osaka, Japan. As of September 2010, it had a total population of 79,435. The ward is located east of Osaka City, and is bordered clockwise north by: Jōtō-ku ward, the core city of Higashiōsaka, and the wards of Ikuno-ku, Tennōji-ku, and Chūō-ku.

The official flower of Higashinari-ku are the rose and the pansy.

== History ==
- April 1, 1925: The area that became Higashinari-ku was incorporated into Osaka as part of the second major expansion of the city. The ward was created from the former district of Higashinari-gun, but not including the area that was previously Sumiyoshi-gun.
- October 1, 1932: A portion was split off to create Asahi-ku.
- April 1, 1943: Jōtō-ku and Ikuno-ku were split off.

In 1925, Higashinari-ku was a vast ward covering most of northeastern Osaka. By 1943 however, it had become one of the smallest wards second only to Naniwa-ku, after two re-drawings of its boundaries. Nevertheless, its population density is still the fourth highest among the wards of Osaka, after Jōtō-ku, Nishi-ku, and Abeno-ku.

== Economy ==
=== Company headquarters ===
- Olfa

== Culture ==
Higashinari-ku ward is home to several Shinto shrines. Yasaka shrine is situated on the west bank of the Hirano river and is dedicated to Susanoo no Mikoto, the old guardian deity of Nakamichi. The shrine was established by Fujiwara no Michinaga as Gozutenno Hakusangongen in 1017, and was moved to its current location in 1584. In 1872, its name was changed to Yasaka. Hachioji shrine is dedicated to four deities and was established in around 273. In the early 700s, Emperor Kotoku gifted the shrine two stone guardian dog statues. It was known as Hachioji Inari or Tsubaki no gu up to 1872 when it was renamed Kudara shrine. When in 1909 it incorporated a neighbouring shrine, it became Hachioji.

== Transportation ==
=== Metro ===
Osaka Metro
Chūō Line: Midoribashi Station - Fukaebashi Station
Sennichimae Line: Imazato Station - Shin-Fukae Station
Imazatosuji Line: Midoribashi Station - Imazato Station

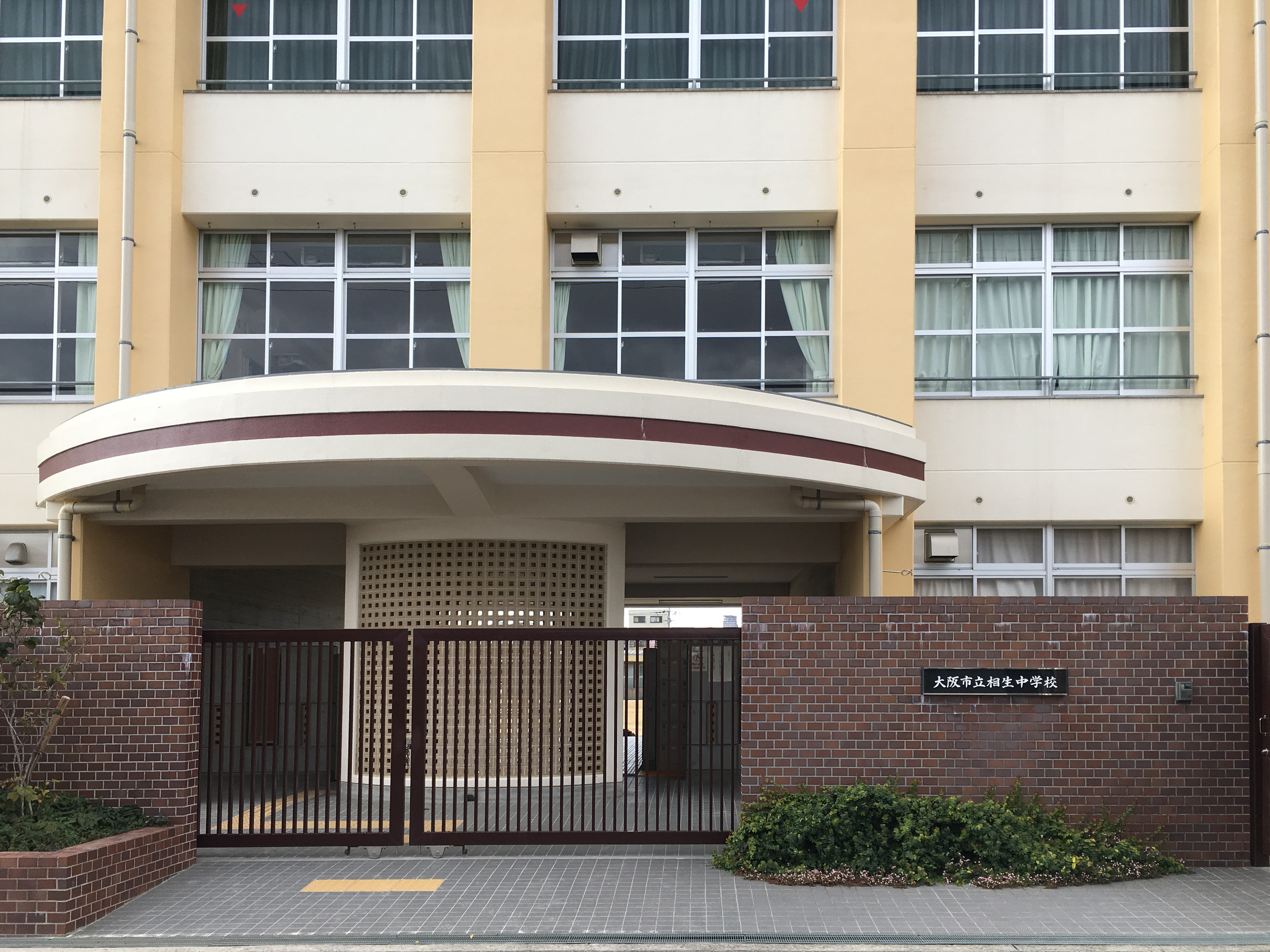
Osaka Municipal Aioi Junior High School in 2017

== Education ==
The ward has a North Korean school, Middle Osaka Korean Elementary School (中大阪朝鮮初級学校).

=== List of educational institutions ===
Elementary schools

- Osaka Shiritsu Taisei (est. 1922)

Junior high schools

- Osaka Shiritsu (est. 1947)
- Osaka Municipal Aioi
