= Gamō-yonchōme Station =

Metro station in Osaka, Japan

Gamo Yonchome Station 蒲生四丁目駅
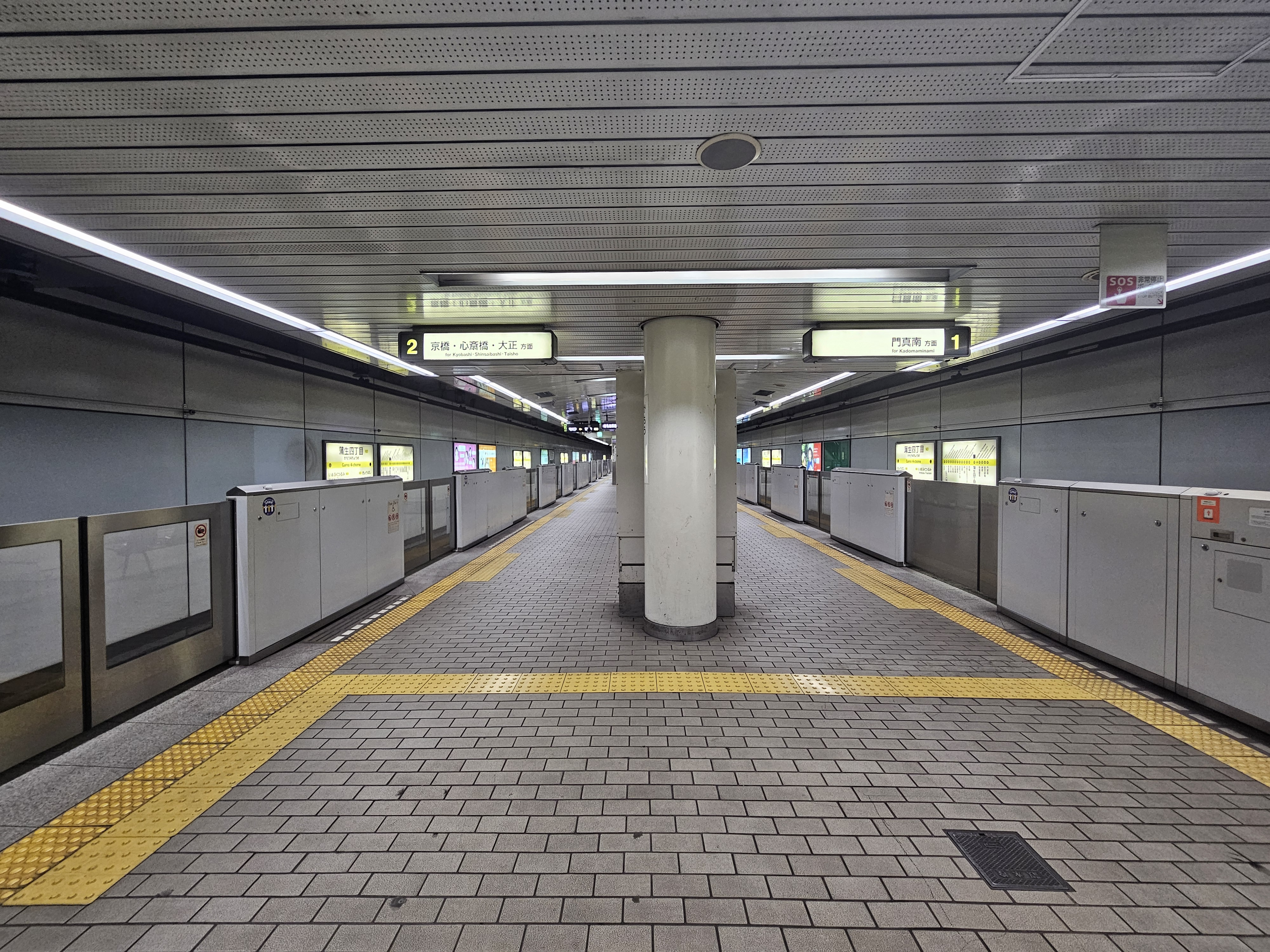
- Nagahori Tsurumiryokuchi Line Gamō-yonchōme Station platform

General information
- Location: 3 Imafuku-nishi, Jōtō, Osaka, Osaka （大阪市城東区今福西三丁目） Japan
- Coordinates: 34°42′01″N 135°32′47″E
- System: Osaka Metro
- Operator: Osaka Metro
- Lines: Nagahori Tsurumi-ryokuchi Line; Imazatosuji Line
- Connections: Bus stop

Construction
- Structure type: Underground

Other information
- Station code: N 23 I 18

History
- Opened: 20 March 1990; 36 years ago

Services
| Preceding station | Osaka Metro | Following station |
|---|---|---|
| Kyōbashi N 22 towards Taishō | Nagahori Tsurumi-ryokuchi Line | Imafuku-Tsurumi N 24 towards Kadoma-minami |
| Sekime-Seiiku I 17 towards Itakano | Imazatosuji Line | Shigino I 19 towards Imazato |
Location
- Location within Osaka Prefecture Location within Japan

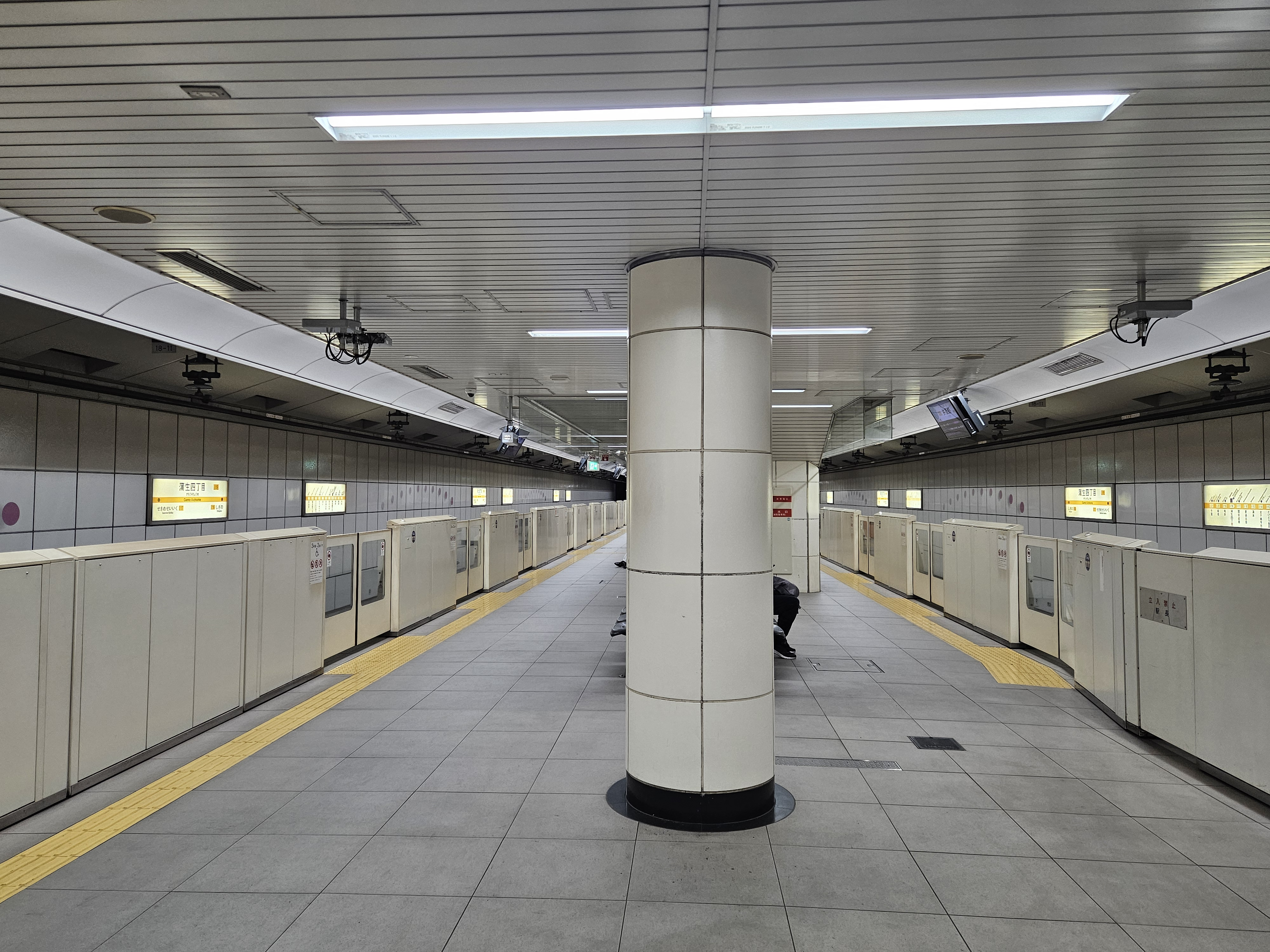
Imazatosuji Line Gamō-yonchōme Station platform

Gamo Yonchome Station (蒲生四丁目駅, Gamō-Yonchōme-eki) is a train station on the Osaka Metro Imazatosuji Line and Nagahori Tsurumi-ryokuchi Line in Jōtō-ku, Osaka, Japan.

== History ==
The station was opened on 20 March 1990, and was connected to the Imazatosuji Line on 24 December 2006.

== Lines ==
Gamo Yonchome Station is served by the Osaka Metro Nagahori Tsurumi-ryokuchi Line (station number N23) and Imazatosuji Line (station number I18).

== Station layout ==
This station has an island platform with two tracks underground for each line, and fenced with platform screen doors.

=== Nagahori Tsurumi-ryokuchi Line ===
| 1 | ■ Nagahori Tsurumi-ryokuchi Line | for Kadomaminami |
| 2 | ■ Nagahori Tsurumi-ryokuchi Line | for Kyobashi, Shinsaibashi and Taisho |

=== Imazatosuji Line ===
| 1 | ■ Imazatosuji Line | for Midoribashi and Imazato |
| 2 | ■ Imazatosuji Line | for Taishibashi-Imaichi and Itakano |
