= Imazatosuji Line =

Metro line in Osaka prefecture, Japan

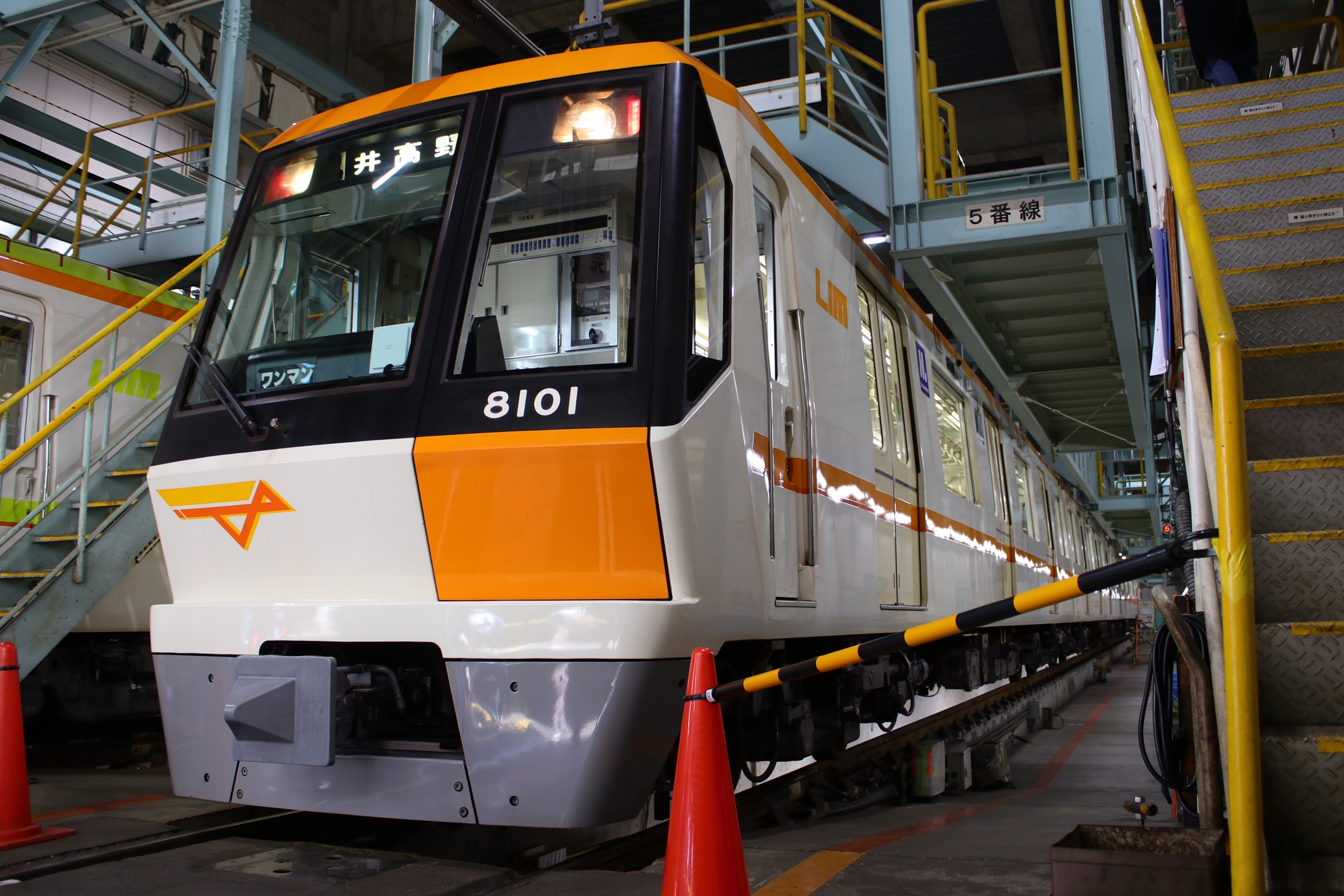
- Imazatosuji Line 80 series

Overview
- Owner: Osaka Metro Co., Ltd. (2018–present); Osaka Municipal Transportation Bureau (2006–2018)
- Line number: 8
- Locale: Osaka, Japan
- Termini: Itakano; Imazato
- Stations: 11
- Color on map: Tangerine (#EE7B1A)

Service
- Type: Rapid transit
- System: Osaka Metro
- Operator: Osaka Metro
- Depot: Tsurumi-ryokuchi-kita
- Rolling stock: 80 series EMUs
- Daily ridership: 68,000 (2017)

History
- Opened: 24 December 2006; 19 years ago

Technical
- Line length: 11.9 km (7.4 mi)
- Number of tracks: Double-track
- Track gauge: 1,435 mm (4 ft 8 1/2 in) standard gauge
- Minimum radius: 83 m (272 ft)
- Electrification: 1,500 V DC (overhead line)
- Operating speed: 70 km/h (43 mph)
- Signalling: Cab signalling
- Train protection system: CS-ATC, ATO
- Maximum incline: 5.0%
Route map

The Imazatosuji Line (今里筋線, Imazatosuji-sen) is a rapid transit line of Osaka Metro, running from Itakano Station in Higashiyodogawa-ku to Imazato Station in Higashinari-ku, all within Osaka city. Its official name is Rapid Electric Tramway Line No. 8 (高速電気軌道第8号線), and in MLIT publications, it is written as Line No. 8 (Imazatosuji Line) (8号線（今里筋線）). Station numbers are indicated by the letter I. The line first opened, at its present length, on Christmas Eve (24 December) 2006.

The line color on maps, station signs, and train livery is golden orange (柑子色, kōji-iro; Munsell code 5YR6.5/14). The line's symbol is a capital I on a solid golden-orange roundel; while all other lines use Parisine for their mark, the "I" of the Imazatosuji Line has serifs, similar to Verdana.

== Overview ==
As with the Nagahori Tsurumi-ryokuchi Line, the Imazatosuji Line utilizes linear motor-driven trains with a cross-section 20% smaller than that of conventional subway cars, outfitted for driver-only operation.

The line runs north–south through the eastern part of Osaka city, underneath National Route 479 (Osaka Inner Loop Route), National Route 163, National Route 1 (Keihan National Highway), and Imazatosuji, intersecting subway lines radiating out from the city center, as well as the Keihan Main Line and the Katamachi Line (Gakkentoshi Line).

Apart from the JR Tōzai Line, this is the only other rail line to cross the Yodo River via tunnels (and the only subway line to do so). It is the only subway line to pass entirely outside the Osaka Loop Line, and the only conventional subway line that does not have any connections to the Midōsuji Line, the Yotsubashi Line, or the Sakaisuji Line. It passes briefly outside Osaka city, with some of the vicinity of Taishibashi-Imaichi being in Moriguchi. The area around the line is predominantly residential.

Station platforms were the first in the Osaka subway network to be outfitted with automatic platform gates, which are 1.3 m (4 ft 3 in) in height and open and close simultaneously with train doors. Platform edges were designed to be adjusted in 1 mm (0.039 in) increments, so that the gap between platform and train is much smaller than on other lines. Stations also have toilets compatible with ostomy pouching systems, and, apart from Taishibashi-Imaichi, two large elevators designed with the ability to transport passengers who suffer medical emergencies.

In order to drive down construction costs, stations are designed to have as many elements in common as possible. Platforms are also designed to be identical. This is a marked contrast with the Nagahori Tsurumi-ryokuchi Line (constructed at the height of the Bubble years), where the design of each station is different and representative of the surrounding area.

Many of the stations feature adjacent underground bicycle parking. In addition, stations belonging only to the Imazatosuji Line (or exits of existing stations opened with the line) feature a large, bright-orange gate designed to be visible from far away.

=== Deferred future extension ===
An extension southward from Imazato to Yuzato Rokuchōme in Higashisumiyoshi-ku, originally slated as Phase II of construction, has been deferred.

=== Line data ===
- Double track sections: Entire line
- Blocking system: In-cab signalling
- Train protection system: CS-ATC, TASC
- Train length: 4 cars (2006 – present)
- Maximum train length (platform length): 6 cars

== Stations ==
All stations are in Osaka.

No.	Station	Japanese	Distance (km)	Transfers	Location
I 11	Itakano	井高野	0.0		Higashiyodogawa-ku
I 12	Zuikō Yonchōme	瑞光四丁目	0.9		Higashiyodogawa-ku
I 13	Daidō-Toyosato	だいどう豊里	1.9		Higashiyodogawa-ku
I 14	Taishibashi-Imaichi	太子橋今市	3.7	Tanimachi Line (T13)	Asahi-ku
I 15	Shimizu	清水	4.9		Asahi-ku
I 16	Shimmori-Furuichi	新森古市	5.8		Asahi-ku
I 17	Sekime-Seiiku	関目成育	7.1	Keihan Main Line	Jōtō-ku
I 18	Gamō Yonchōme	蒲生四丁目	8.5	Nagahori Tsurumi-ryokuchi Line (N23)	Jōtō-ku
I 19	Shigino	鴫野	9.4	H Gakkentoshi Line	Jōtō-ku
I 20	Midoribashi	緑橋	10.6	Chūō Line (C20)	Higashinari-ku
I 21	Imazato	今里	11.9	Sennichimae Line (S20)	Higashinari-ku

== Stopping patterns ==
All trains stop at every station on their route. Most trains operate between Itakano and Imazato; in the morning and the evening, trains also operate between Itakano and Shimizu. In rush hour on weekdays, there are generally 11–15 trains per hour, with 7–8 trains per hour at off-peak times. Weekend timetables have 9–10 trains per hour in morning and evening, and 7–8 trains per hour (roughly one every eight minutes) off-peak. There are usually 12 Itakano – Shimizu trains on weekdays (7 morning, 5 evening), and 5 on weekends and holidays (3 morning, 2 evening). There are also two weekday morning trains that start at Shimizu and terminate at Imazato.

== Rolling stock ==
- 80 series (4-car trainsets, 2006–present)

There is an underground train depot on a spur between Shimizu and Shimmori-Furuichi built underneath the northwest gate of the Tsurumi-ryokuchi park; the tracks continue on from there towards Tsurumi-ryokuchi on the Nagahori Tsurumi-ryokuchi Line, and the two lines share the same maintenance yard (Tsurumi Workshop).

== Ridership ==
According to data collected on 1 March 2007, two months after the line's opening, daily ridership on the Imazatosuji Line (all stations, including transfer passengers) was 37,000, less than one-third the projected amount (120,000). On 15 June of the same year, a survey conducted at the end of April was released that showed passenger numbers at the seven stations not connecting to other subway lines to be approximately 45,000 per day. At the end of fiscal 2010, ridership for the line stood at roughly 56,800 passengers per day.

When the Imazatosuji Line opened, the number of city buses running between Imazato and Sekime-Seiiku was reduced to 2–3 per hour. Nevertheless, many people still prefer to ride the buses, as they are more accessible than the subway stations, which are further apart and fairly deep underground, requiring them to walk a greater distance.

Due to the presence of existing lines, stations on the Imazatosuji Line were built deeper underground, so transfers at connecting stations take longer than average. Originally, it was believed that there would be many passengers using the line to access the Osaka University of Economics (as the nearest station is Zuikō Yonchōme); however, because reaching Umeda would require a lengthy transfer to the Tanimachi Line at Taishibashi-Imaichi, many of those people continue to use the Kami-Shinjō station (which is more distant from the university) on the Hankyu Kyoto Line, and ridership has not increased substantially. Additionally, while there are fewer buses than before, they continue to compete with the line for ridership, due to their flat fare and greater number of stops. Despite the relatively short train length (only 4 cars), trains are rarely full.

In 2015, ridership for the line would eventually reach nearly 65,000 passengers per day, which is still less than two-thirds of the projected ridership. All of these issues have resulted in the line operating in a deficit as of 2018.

== History ==
Since 1957, trolleybuses had run on Imazatosuji, providing connections with the Osaka streetcar network to the city center and serving as a major transport corridor of eastern Osaka. However, due to increasing automobile use, trolleybus service was ended in 1969. While city buses continued serving the same corridor, they encountered frequent delays due to traffic. As a result, a subway line was planned to interface with the existing rail network.

In the 10th report of the Transport Policy Committee in 1989, the plan was listed as a "line that should be considered for future construction" between Kami-Shinjō and Yuzato Rokuchōme. Later on, as underground obstructions were discovered along the planned route, the starting point was changed in 1996 from Kami-Shinjō to Itakano, where the population was increasing due to residential development. Permission to construct the line from Itakano to Imazato was granted in 1999, and construction began in March 2000. The line opened at noon on 24 December 2006. The remaining section, from Imazato to Yuzato Rokuchōme, remains on hold.

=== Timeline ===
- 6 July 2006: Line name and station names are officially announced.
- 24 December 2006: Official opening of the line (Itakano – Imazato, 11.9 km (7.4 mi)).

== Construction ==
Many areas of construction faced difficulties, which made for slow progress. In order to avoid existing subway lines and other underground structures, nearly the entire line had to be constructed at least 10 m (33 ft) below street level; in particular, where the line crosses the Neya River and No. 2 Neya River, it reaches over 30 m (98 ft) below ground (between Shigino and Midoribashi, where it crosses the No. 2 Neya River, it reaches 37 m (121 ft), the greatest depth of any line in the Osaka subway network; however, the line's stations are not as deep as the Osaka Business Park station on the Nagahori Tsurumi-ryokuchi Line). Because of this, it also features a greater number of steep grades compared to existing lines.

The ground stratum the Imazatosuji Line runs through is a "super-soft clay deposit", which is soft and has a high water content; in many instances, bulldozers were useless in excavating the soil. Absorbent cylindrical piles made of chalk were driven in an effort to stabilize the ground, but had relatively little effect.

The northernmost part of the line runs under narrow streets, less than 8 m (26 ft) across in the case of Daidō-Toyosato – Zuikō Yonchōme. Because of this, the tunnels in this area are bored one atop the other, a method of construction without any other examples in the Osaka subway system. Further south, there is an extremely tight curve between Shimizu and Shimmori-Furuichi (at the Midori 1-chōme intersection), with a radius of 83 m (272 ft); this is the tightest curve on any Osaka subway line (excluding inter-line connections and depots). Trains must reduce speed to 30 km/h (19 mph) in this area.

Because of these engineering difficulties, the expected 1/3 cost savings of employing smaller cross-section tunnels and linear motor trains did not emerge; instead, construction costs ballooned to ¥271.8 billion.

== Controversy over planned extension ==
While planned as the first of two phases of construction, the segment between Itakano and Imazato alone cost ¥271.8 billion to build. If the extension of the line to its intended terminus at Yuzato Rokuchōme were to continue as planned, assessment and construction would have cost an additional ¥132 billion, substantially increasing the financial burden on Osaka city. For this reason, then-mayor Junichi Seki ran for re-election in 2005 promising to bring the planned line extension up for review.

On 28 November of that year, the newly re-elected mayor Seki announced that groundbreaking on the Imazato – Yuzato Rokuchōme extension, planned for 2006 with a 2016 opening, would be put on hold indefinitely due to the fiscal situation in Osaka. Because of this, the application for permission to start construction has been postponed. If the northern half opened in 2006 were to provide favorable ridership figures, the southern extension would have a chance of going on as planned. However, the other subway line inaugurated during the Heisei era (the Nagahori Tsurumi-ryokuchi Line) had yet to meet expectations a decade after opening (FY 2005 ridership: roughly 88,000 per day), despite passing through the city center; as such, the chance of the Imazatosuji Line, which did not pass through the city center, of meeting its ridership estimates and providing a stable financial base for a southward extension, was seen as extremely low. In addition, Osaka city had changed its future outlook for the Municipal Transportation Bureau from one of conversion to public holding / private operation to "full privatization including the possibility being listed on the stock exchange"; if this were to go ahead, the chance of the line's completion according to the original plans would go from slim to nearly none. Since that time, however, Kunio Hiramatsu was elected mayor in 2007, promising to maintain the region's public entities as-is, and deciding whether to privatize the Transportation Bureau by public referendum while in office. The financial situation of the Osaka Municipal Subway network has also stabilized since fiscal 2005 with a steady cumulative profit (even though four of eight lines are still not profitable on their own), perhaps making an extension more likely at some point in the future. However, on 28 August 2014, the extension to Yuzato Rokuchōme was mothballed, and the Osaka Municipal Transportation Bureau has considered light rail or bus rapid transit for further expansion of public transit services within Osaka, citing the high cost of building subway extensions and eventual privatization.

In addition to the originally-planned southern extension, there have also been considerations of extending the line northward from Itakano towards Shōjaku on the Hankyu Kyoto Line and Kishibe or Senrioka on the Tōkaidō Main Line (JR Kyoto Line). (The start of the line at Itakano is listed as 3.3 km (2.1 mi) in the proposal, and 3.3 km (2.1 mi) from Itakano would be precisely at Senrioka.) There have also been calls to extend the line even further towards Esaka or Momoyamadai, to allow a direct connection to the Midōsuji Line, or to Bampaku-kinen-kōen to connect to the Osaka Monorail. In spite of these ideas, in addition to the fiscal considerations concerning the southern extension, there is also the matter of a northern extension being outside Osaka city, making it even more unlikely.

On 1 April 2019, the Imazato Liner bus rapid transit line began operations; the BRT service (which consists of two routes known as BRT1 and BRT2) connects the Imazato station with the southeastern portions of the city that are not served by the Tanimachi Line, including Kumata and Yuzato Rokuchōme. Both routes diverge at Tōbu-shijō-mae (which is served by the Yamatoji Line), where BRT1 continues to Nagai on the Midōsuji Line and BRT2 continues to Tennōji. At the time of implementation, it was intended for the BRT service to be a five-year long test to help determine the feasibility of building the extension of the Imazatosuji Line to Yuzato Rokuchōme.
