= Asahi-ku, Osaka =

Ward of Osaka, Japan

Coordinates: 34°43′17″N 135°32′39″E

Location of Asahi-ku in Osaka City

Asahi (旭区, Asahi-ku) is one of 24 wards of Osaka, Japan. It is located in the northeast of the city, near the satellite town of Moriguchi. It was split off from Higashinari in 1932. Asahi-ku itself is further divided into the following areas (towns); Shimizu, Morishoji, Omiya, Nakamiya, Takadono, Akagawa, Ikue, Shinmori, Senbayashi, Taishibashi, and Imaichi.

Asahi-ku borders the Osaka wards of:

- Higashiyodogawa
- Miyakojima
- Joto
- Tsurumi

and the city of Moriguchi

== Transport ==
Asahi-ku is served by the Tanimachi Line, and the Imazatosuji Line of the Osaka Metro and by the Keihan Main Line.

Stations:

- Tanimachi subway line: Sekime-Takadono Station, Sembayashi-Omiya Station, Taishibashi-Imaichi Station
- Imazato Suji subway line: Shimmori-Furuichi Station, Shimizu Station, Taishibashi-Imaichi Station
- Keihan Main Line: Morishoji Station, Sembayashi Station

== Schools ==
There are 10 elementary schools (years one to six), four junior high schools (three years), two public and one private high school (three years), and one private university.

Elementary Schools: Furichi, Takadono, Takadono Minami, Shirokita, Shin Morishoji, Shimizu, Taishibashi, Omiya, Omiya Nishi.

Junior High Schools: Kyokuyo, Kyokuto, Imaichi, Omiya.

High Schools: Asahi, Yodogawa Kogyo, Osaka Kogyo University High School (private).

College:

- Osaka Institute of Technology Junior College

University:

- Osaka Institute of Technology

North Korean school:

- Johoku Korean Elementary School (城北朝鮮初級学校)

== Places of interest ==
Places of interest include the Shirokita Park with its Iris Garden, the Yodogawa Wando (pools formed by the Yodogawa River, the Osaka Municipal Space of Art, and Senbayashi Shotengai (shopping arcade).

Senbayashi Shotengai is famous for its long covered shopping street. The shopping street even has a theme song that can be heard as you walk along the covered part of the street. Sembayashi-Omiya subway station can be found at the other end of the shopping street. The first Daiei store opened near this station. Some of the favorite stores have been the Kadoya Ice Cream Parlor, a popular hangout for students of the nearby highschool, and Enomoto Confectionary Gift Shop. There is also a fish market that specializes in whale meat.
