= Itakano Station =

Metro station in Osaka, Japan

Itakano Station 井高野駅
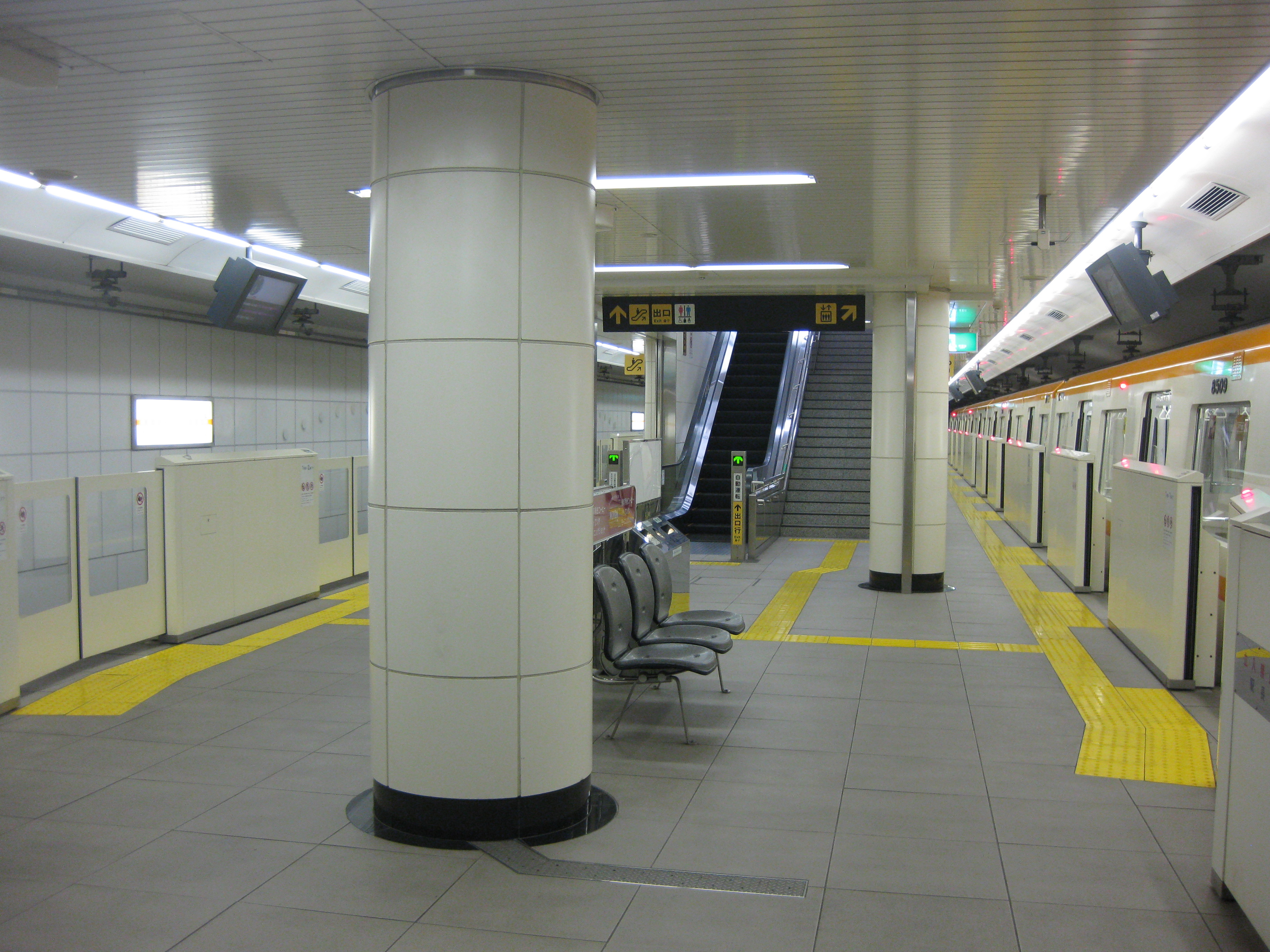
- Station platform

General information
- Location: Higashiyodogawa, Osaka, Osaka; Japan
- Coordinates: 34°45′36″N 135°32′50″E
- Operator: Osaka Metro
- Line: Imazatosuji Line
- Platforms: 1 island platform
- Tracks: 2

Construction
- Structure type: Underground

Other information
- Station code: I 11

History
- Opened: 24 December 2006; 19 years ago

Services
| Preceding station | Osaka Metro | Following station |
|---|---|---|
| Terminus | Imazatosuji Line | Zuikō Yonchōme I 12 towards Imazato |
Location
- Location within Osaka Prefecture Location within Japan

Itakano Station (井高野駅, Itakano-eki; station number: I11) is a train station on the Osaka Metro Imazatosuji Line in Higashiyodogawa-ku, Osaka, Japan. It is the northern terminus of the line and the northernmost subway station in the city of Osaka.

== Station layout ==
There is an island platform with two tracks underground. The platform is fenced with platform screen doors.

| 1, 2 | ■ Imazatosuji Line | for Taishibashi-Imaichi, Gamo Yonchome, Midoribashi and Imazato |
