= Higashiyodogawa-ku =

Ward of Osaka, Japan

Coordinates: 34°44′28″N 135°31′46″E

Location of Higashiyodogawa-ku in Osaka City

Higashiyodogawa-ku (東淀川区) is one of 24 wards of Osaka, Japan.

Higashiyodogawa-ku is located in the north-east part of Osaka city.

As of September 1, 2025, the population of Higashiyodogawa-ku is 177,809. 87,081 of them are men and 90,728 are women.

The popular area to shop is Awaji, which is about 10 minutes away from Umeda by train ride (Hankyu Railways Kyōto Main Line).

The cosmetic company Shiseido's main factory is in Komatsu, Higashiyodogawa-ku.

== Economy ==
=== Company headquarters ===
- Keyence - Higashinakajima

== Transportation ==
=== Railways ===
JR West - F Osaka Higashi Line

- JR-Awaji

Hankyu - Hankyu Kyoto Line

- Sōzenji - Awaji - Kami-Shinjō - Aikawa

Osaka Metro - Imazatosuji Line

- Itakano - Zuikō Yonchōme - Daidō-Toyosato

=== National Highways ===
- National Route 479

== Education ==
=== Elementary schools ===
- Osaka Municipal Higashi-Awaji Elementary School
- Osaka Municipal Nishi-Awaji Elementary School (Suganomori Gakuen)
- Osaka Municipal Sugawara Elementary School
- Osaka Municipal Shinjo Elementary School
- Osaka Municipal Osumi Higashi Elementary School
- Osaka Municipal Toyosato Elementary School
- Osaka Municipal Keihatsu Elementary School (Mukunoki Gakuen)
- Osaka Municipal Komatsu Elementary School
- Osaka Municipal Shimoshinjo Elementary School
- Osaka Municipal Itakano Elementary School
- Osaka Municipal Otori Elementary School
- Osaka Municipal Hoshin Elementary School
- Osaka Municipal Higashi-Itakano Elementary School
- Osaka Municipal Osumi Nishi Elementary School
- Osaka Municipal Toyosato Minami Elementary School
- Osaka Municipal Daido Minami Elementary School

=== Junior high schools ===
- Osaka Municipal Awaji Junior High School (Suganomori Gakuen)
- Osaka Municipal Shibashima Junior High School
- Osaka Municipal Zuiko Junior High School
- Osaka Municipal Nakajima Junior High School (Mukunoki Gakuen)
- Osaka Municipal Higashiyodo Junior High School
- Osaka Municipal Itakano Junior High School
- Osaka Municipal Shinhigashiyodo Junior High School
- Osaka Municipal Otori Junior High School

=== Senior high schools ===
- Osaka High School
- Osaka Seikei Girls' High School
- Osaka Prefectural Yodogawa Seiryu High School
- Osaka Prefectural Shibashima High School
- Kansai University Hokuyo Senior High School

=== Universities and junior colleges ===
- Osaka University of Economics
- Osaka Seikei University
- Osaka Seikei College

=== Support schools ===
- Osaka Prefectural Osaka Kita School for the Visually Impaired
- Osaka Prefectural Higashiyodogawa Support School
