= Midoribashi Station =

Metro station in Osaka, Japan

Coordinates: 34°40′50.7″N 135°32′40.49″E

Midoribashi Station 緑橋駅
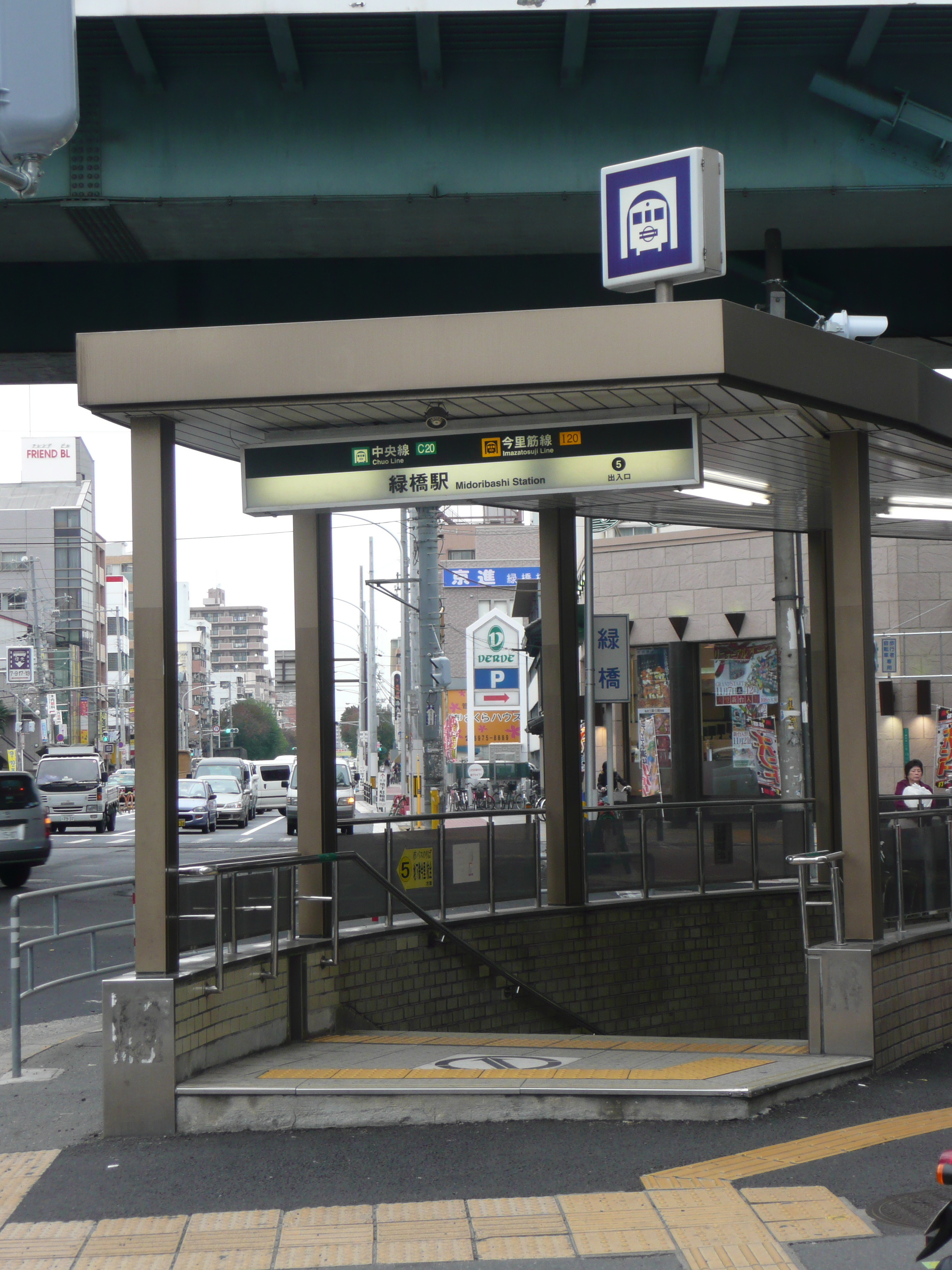
- Station entrance

General information
- System: Osaka Metro
- Operator: Osaka Metro
- Lines: Chūō Line.; Imazatosuji Line
- Platforms: 2 island platforms (1 per line)
- Tracks: 4 (2 per line)

Construction
- Structure type: Underground

Other information
- Station code: C 20 I 20

History
- Opened: 29 July 1968; 58 years ago

Services
Preceding station	Osaka Metro	Following station
Morinomiya C 19 towards Yumeshima	Chūō Line	Fukaebashi C 21 towards Nagata
Shigino I 19 towards Itakano	Imazatosuji Line	Imazato I 21 Terminus
Location
- Location within Osaka Prefecture Location within Japan

Midoribashi Station (緑橋駅, Midoribashi-eki) is a metro station on the Osaka Metro Chūō Line and Imazatosuji Line in Higashinari-ku, Osaka, Japan.

== Lines ==
- Osaka Metro

- Chūō Line (Station Number: C20)
- Imazatosuji Line (Station Number: I20)

== Layout ==
There is an island platform with 2 tracks underground for each line. The platform for the Imazatosuji Line is fenced with platform gates.

Chūō Line

1	■ Chūō Line	for Nagata, Ikoma and Gakken Nara-Tomigaoka
2	■ Chūō Line	for Tanimachi Yonchome, Hommachi, Bentencho, Osakako and Yumeshima

Imazatosuji Line

1	■ Imazatosuji Line	to Imazato
2	■ Imazatosuji Line	for Gamo Yonchome, Taishibashi-Imaichi and Itakano
