= Imazato Station (Osaka Metro) =

Metro station in Osaka, Japan

Coordinates: 34°40′7.17″N 135°32′39.44″E

Imazato Station 今里駅
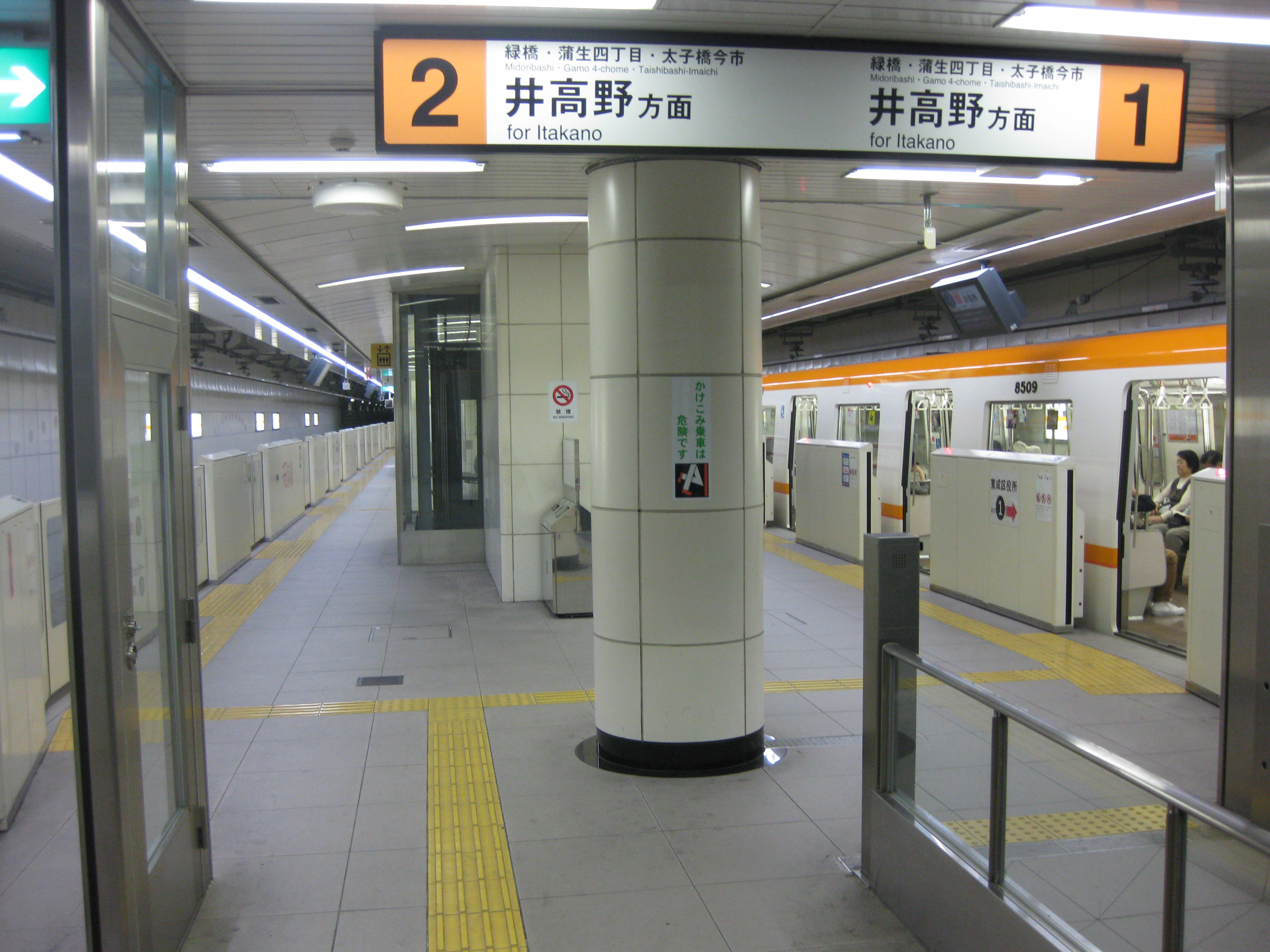
- Imazatosuji Line platforms

General information
- Location: Japan
- System: Osaka Metro
- Operator: Osaka Metro
- Lines: Sennichimae Line; Imazatosuji Line
- Platforms: 2 island platforms (1 on each level)
- Tracks: 4 (2 on each level)
- Connections: Imazato Liner bus rapid transit

Construction
- Structure type: Underground

Other information
- Station code: S 20 I 21

History
- Opened: 25 July 1969; 57 years ago

Services
| Preceding station | Osaka Metro | Following station |
|---|---|---|
| Tsuruhashi S 19 towards Nodahanshin | Sennichimae Line | Shin-Fukae S 21 towards Minami-Tatsumi |
| Midoribashi I 20 towards Itakano | Imazatosuji Line | Terminus |
Location
- Location within Osaka Prefecture Location within Japan

Imazato Station (今里駅, Imazato eki) is a rapid transit station on the Osaka Metro lines in Higashinari-ku, Osaka, Japan.

== Lines ==
- Osaka Metro
  - Sennichimae Line (S20)
  - Imazatosuji Line (I 21)

== Layout ==
Imazato Station is located under Imazato Junction. There is an island platform with two tracks for each line, fenced with platform gates.

Sennichimae Line

| 1 | ■ Sennichimae Line | for Minami-Tatsumi |
| 2 | ■ Sennichimae Line | for Namba, Awaza and Nodahanshin |

Imazatosuji Line

| 1, 2 | ■ Imazatosuji Line | for Midoribashi, Gamo Yonchome, Taishibashi-Imaichi and Itakano |

Storage tracks for the Sennichimae Line are located in the west and east of the platform, 2 tracks in the west, 1 in the east. The west side tracks were the tracks of Moinomiya Inspection Depot Imazato Branch until Morinomiya Inspection Depot was closed in 2011. The east side track provides space for two 4-car trains.

== Surroundings ==
=== Public Facilities ===
- Higashinari Ward Office
- Higashinari Library

=== Shopping ===
- Life Corporation Imazato
- TSUTAYA Imazato

=== Others ===
- Imazato Junction (Japan National Route 308 (Nagahori-dori Avenue), Osaka Prefectural Route 702 (Sennichimae-dori Avenue), Imazato-suji Avenue)
