= Taishibashi-Imaichi Station =

Metro station in Osaka, Japan

Coordinates: 34°43′53″N 135°33′18″E

Taishibashi-Imaichi Station 太子橋今市駅
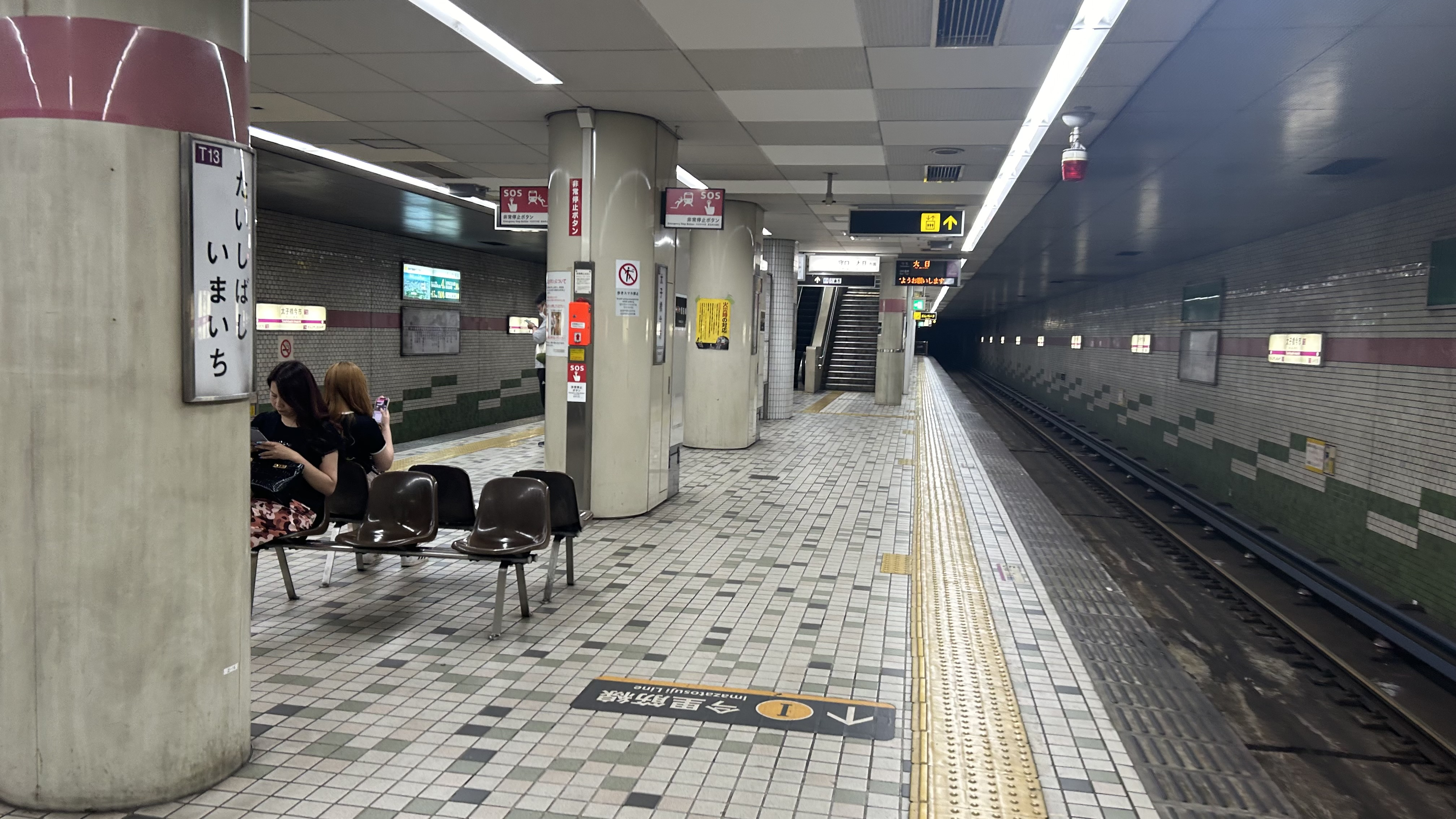
- Taishibashi-Imaichi Station Tanimachi Line platform, May 2024

General information
- Location: 1 Taishibashi, Asahi, Osaka, Osaka Prefecture; Japan
- System: Osaka Metro
- Operator: Osaka Metro
- Lines: Tanimachi Line; Imazatosuji Line
- Platforms: 2 island platforms (1 for each line)
- Tracks: 4 (2 for each line)
- Connections: Underground

Other information
- Station code: T 13 I 14

History
- Opened: 1977 (Tanimachi Line); 2006 (Imazatosuji Line)

Services
Preceding station	Osaka Metro	Following station
Moriguchi T 13 towards Dainichi	Tanimachi Line	Sembayashi-Omiya T 14 towards Yaominami
Daidō-Toyosato I 13 towards Itakano	Imazatosuji Line	Shimizu I 15 towards Imazato
Location
- Location within Osaka Prefecture Location within Japan

Taishibashi-Imaichi Station (太子橋今市駅, Taishibashi-Imaichi-eki) is a railway station serving two lines of the Osaka Metro in Asahi-ku, Osaka and Moriguchi in Osaka Prefecture, Japan.

== Lines ==
Taishibashi-Imaichi Station is served by the Osaka Metro Tanimachi Line (station number T13) and Imazatosuji Line (station number I14).

== Station layout ==
=== Tanimachi Line ===
There is an island platform with two tracks underground.

1	■ Tanimachi Line	for Higashi-Umeda, Tennoji and Yaominami
2	■ Tanimachi Line	for Dainichi

=== Imazatosuji Line ===
There is an island platform with two tracks underground. The platform is fenced with platform screen doors.

1	■ Imazatosuji Line	for Gamo Yonchome, Midoribashi and Imazato
2	■ Imazatosuji Line	for Itakano

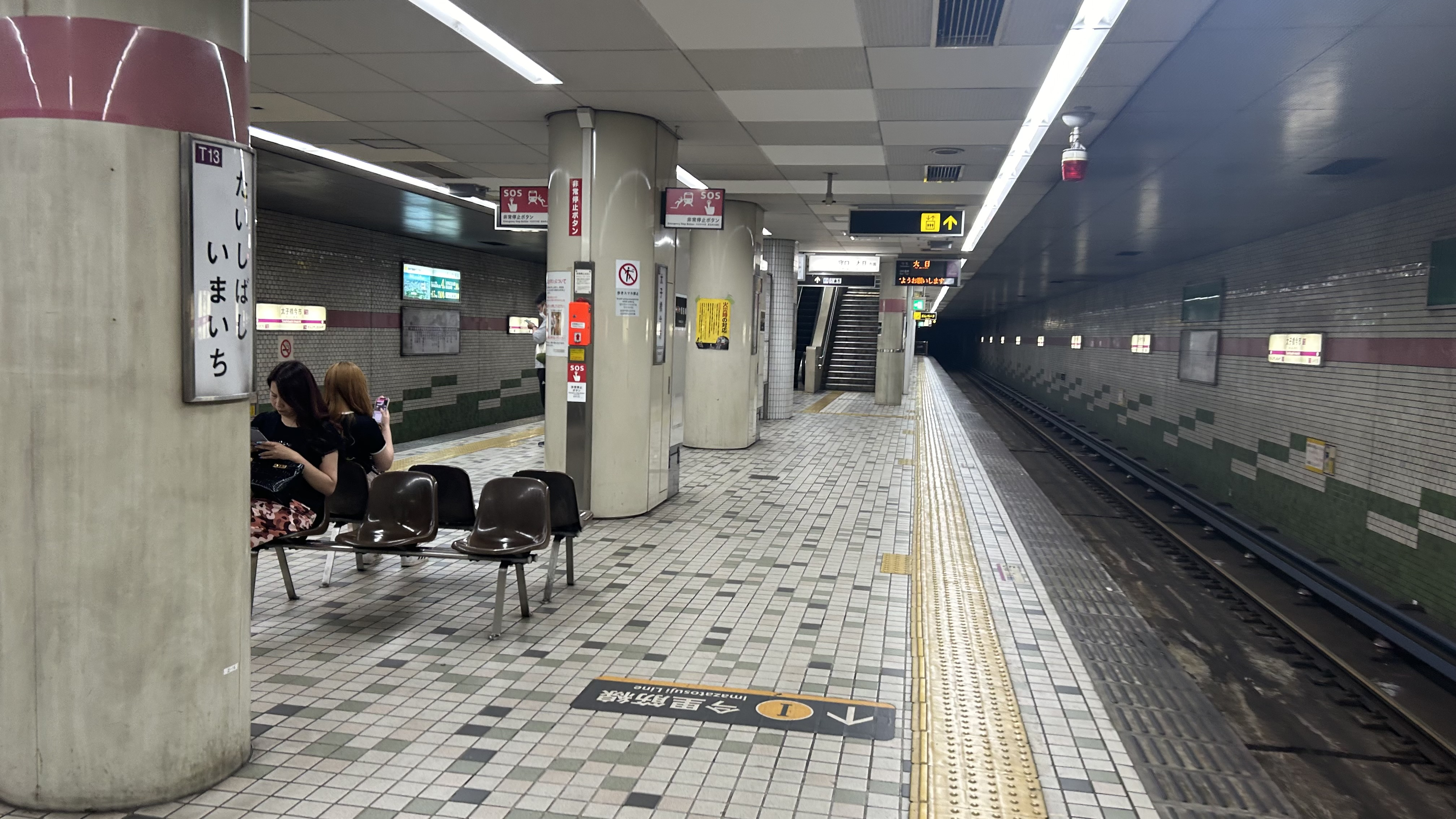
Tanimachi Line platforms (2024)

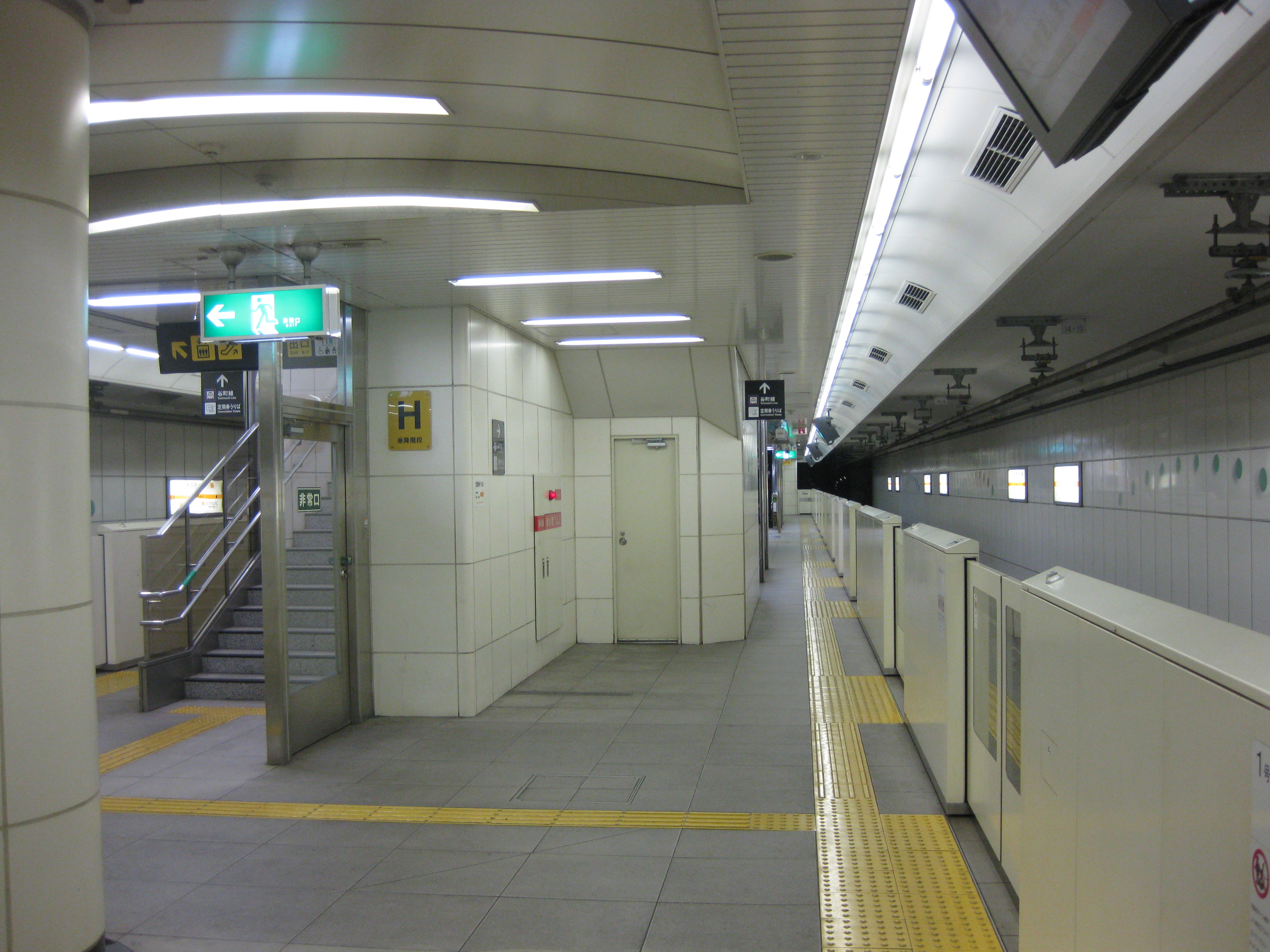
Imazatosuji Line platforms (2012)

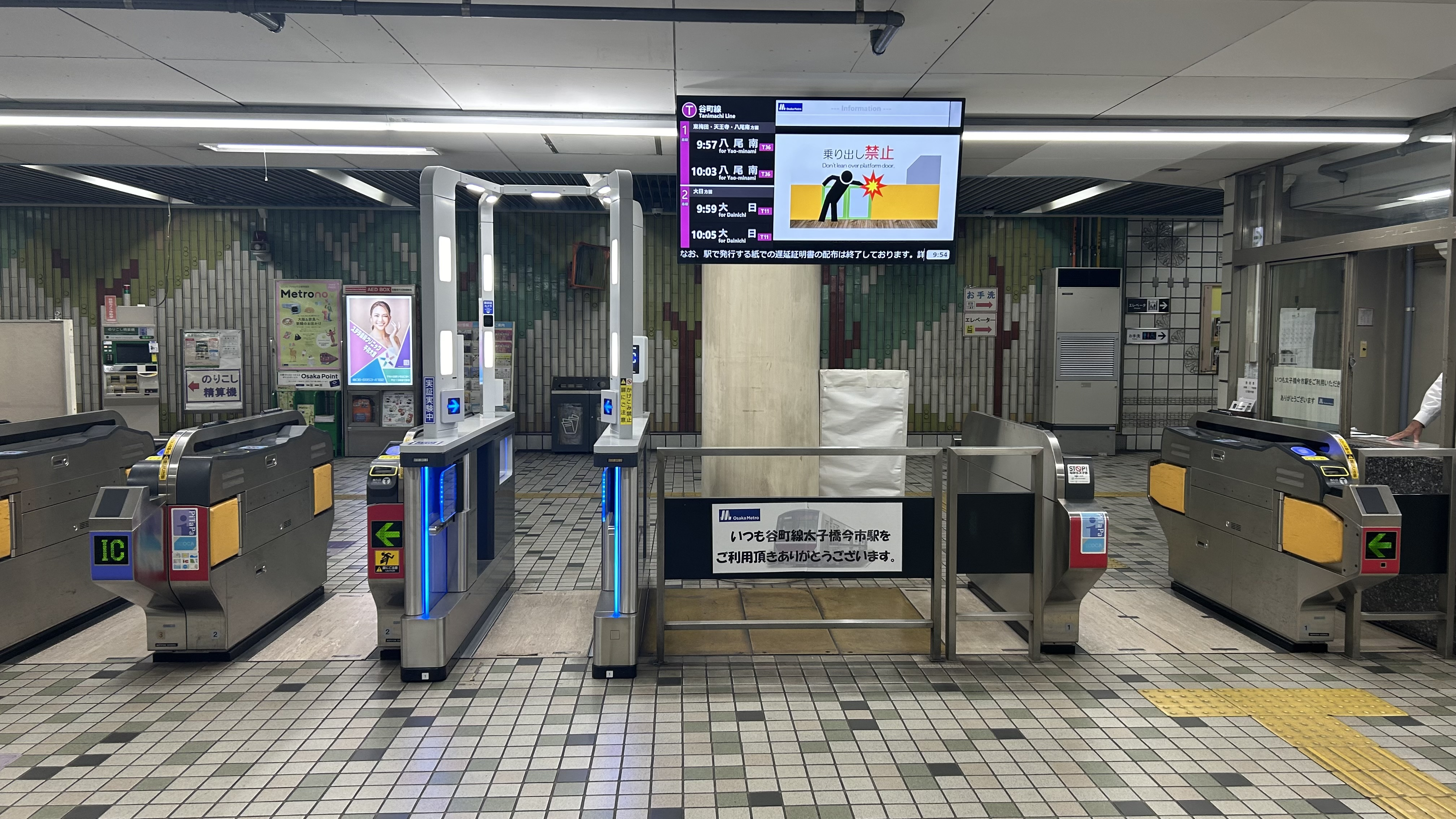
Fare gates (2024)
