= Tanimachi Kyūchōme Station =

Metro station in Osaka, Japan

Coordinates: 34°40′1.72″N 135°30′57.03″E

Tanimachi Kyūchōme Station 谷町九丁目駅
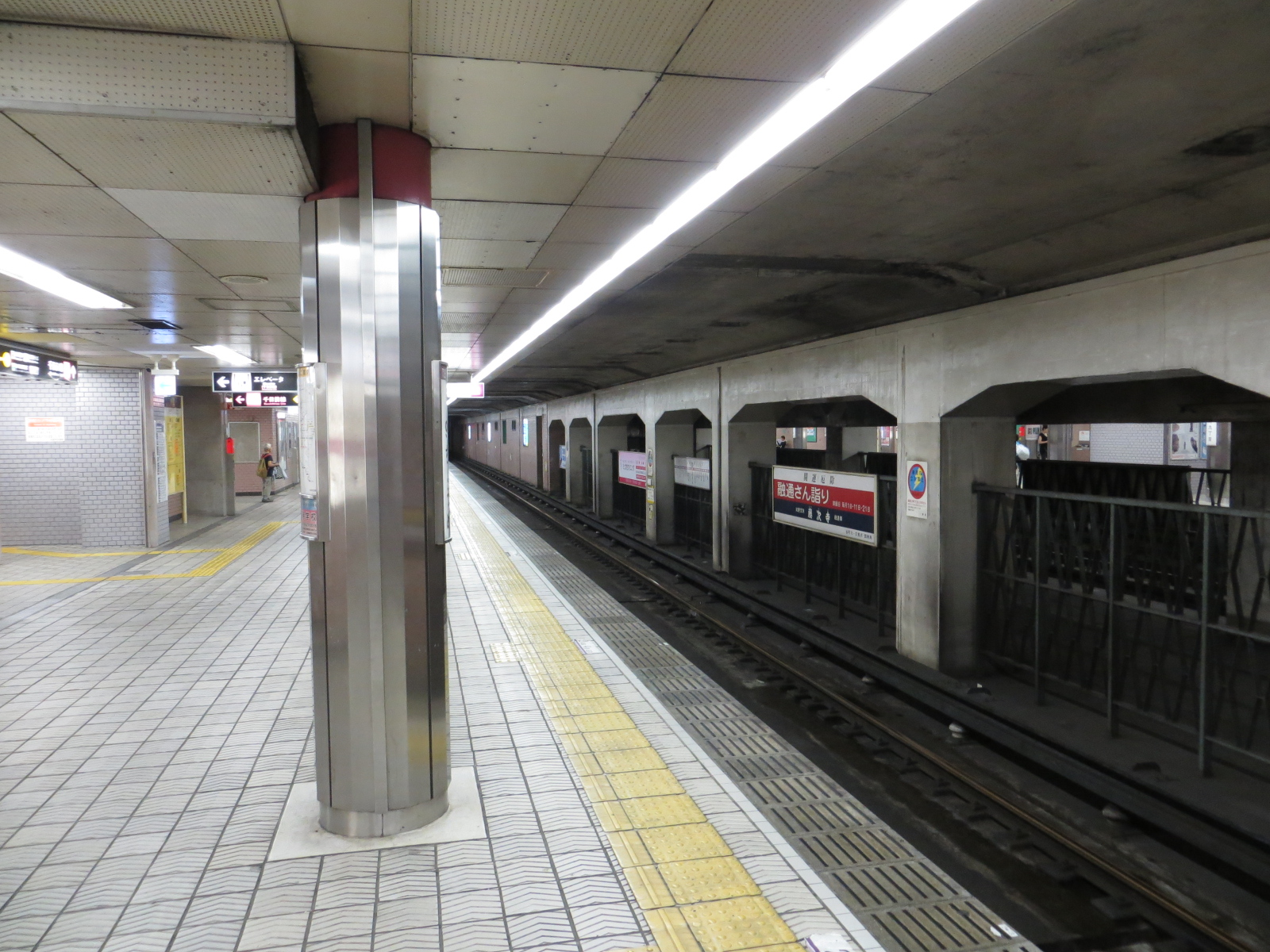
- Tanimachi Line platforms

General information
- Location: Ikutamamaemachi, Tennoji-ku, Osaka-shi, Osaka-fu; Japan
- System: Osaka Metro
- Operator: Osaka Metro
- Lines: Tanimachi Line; Sennichimae Line
- Platforms: 2 side platforms (Tanimachi Line); 1 island platform (Sennichimae Line)
- Tracks: 4
- Connections: Osaka Uehommachi

Other information
- Station code: T 25 S 18

History
- Opened: 17 December 1968; 57 years ago

Passengers
- 74,752 daily

Services
Preceding station	Osaka Metro	Following station
Tanimachi Rokuchome T 24 towards Dainichi	Tanimachi Line	Shitennōji-mae Yūhigaoka T 26 towards Yaominami
Nippombashi S 17 towards Nodahanshin	Sennichimae Line	Tsuruhashi S 19 towards Minami-Tatsumi
Location
- Location within Osaka Prefecture Location within Japan

Tanimachi Kyūchōme Station (谷町九丁目駅, Tanimachi Kyūchōme-eki) is a railway station on the two lines of Osaka Metro in Ikutamamaemachi, Tennōji-ku, Osaka, Japan. Nicknamed "Tani Kyū (たにきゅう)", the station connects with Osaka Uehommachi Station on the Kintetsu lines.

== Lines ==
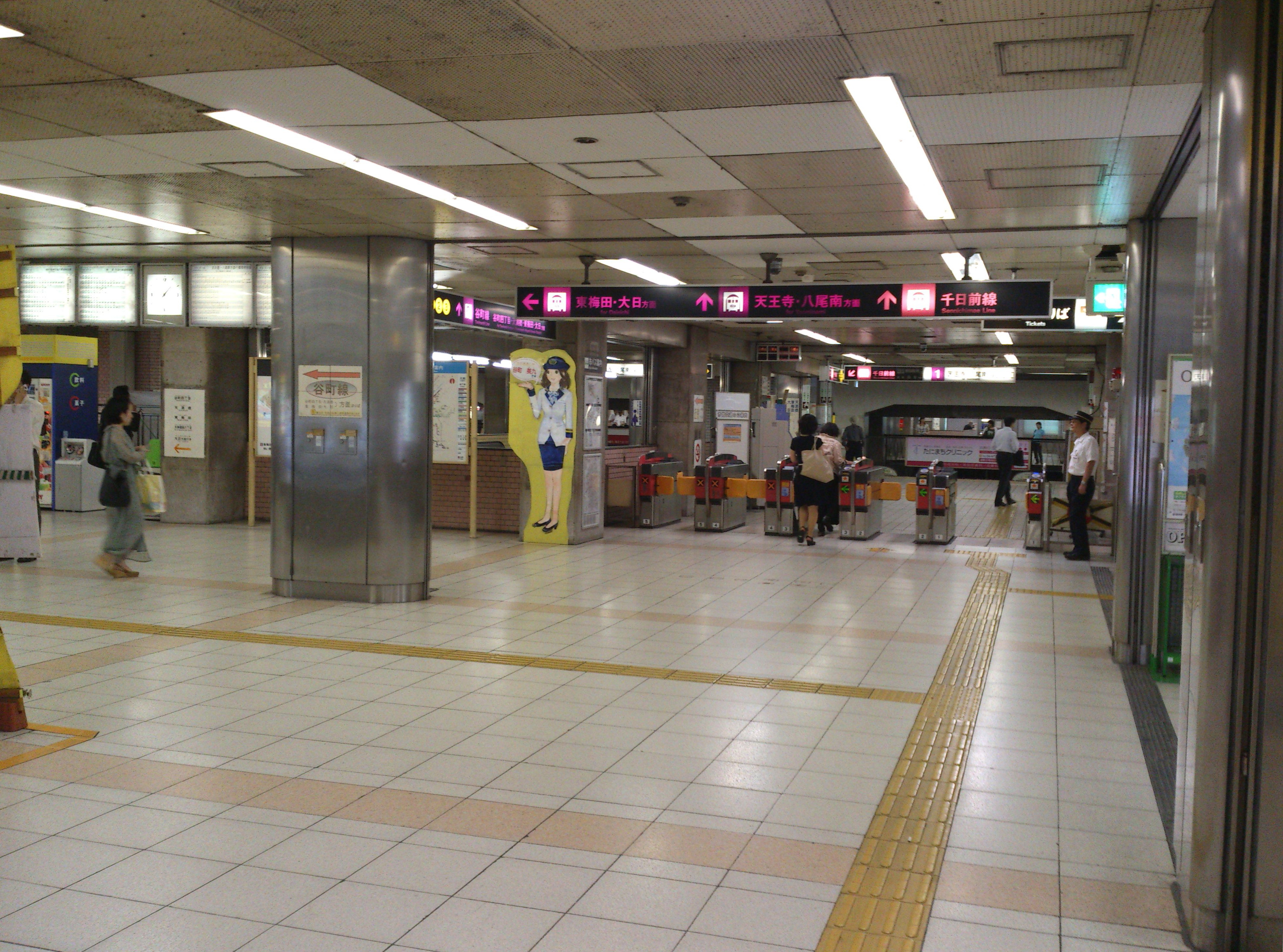
Ticket gates

- Osaka Metro
  - Tanimachi Line (T25)
  - Sennichimae Line (S18)
- Kintetsu (Osaka Uehommachi Station)
  - Osaka Line (D03)
  - Namba Line, Nara Line (A03)

== Service pattern ==
The typical hourly off-peak service from this station is as follows.

=== Tanimachi Line ===
- 10 northbound trains (every 6 minutes) to Dainichi
- 10 southbound trains (every 6 minutes) to Yaominami

=== Sennichimae Line ===
- 8 westbound trains (every 7.5 minutes) to Nodahanshin
- 8 eastbound trains (every 7.5 minutes) to Minami-Tatsumi

== Station layout ==
The station consists of two side platforms serving two tracks for the Tanimachi Line on the first basement, and an island platform serving two tracks for the Sennichimae Line on the second basement.

=== Platforms ===
==== Tanimachi Line ====
1	■ Tanimachi Line	for Tennoji, Fuminosato, and Yaominami
2	■ Tanimachi Line	for Higashi-Umeda, Miyakojima, and Dainichi

==== Sennichimae Line ====
1	■ Sennichimae Line	for Tsuruhashi and Minami-Tatsumi
2	■ Sennichimae Line	for Namba, Awaza, and Nodahanshin

== History ==
The station opened on December 17, 1968 as a stop on Line 2. It became an interchange station on July 25, 1969, when it became the terminus of the section of Line 5 between here and Imazato. Later that year, on December 6, Lines 2 and 5 were named the Tanimachi and Sennichimae Lines respectively. On March 11, 1970, the section of the Sennichimae Line between here and Sakuragawa opened, allowing trains to run to Nodahanshin.

== Surrounding area ==
- Ikukunitama Shrine
- Kozugu
- International House, Osaka
- Seifu Junior/Senior High School
- Uenomiya Junior/Senior High School
- Meisei Junior/Senior High School
- Uehommachi Hi-Hi Town
- Kintetsu Group Headquarters
- Kintetsu Department Store Uehommachi
- Sheraton Miyako Hotel Osaka

== Buses ==
Tanimachi Kyuchome (Osaka City Bus)

- Route 73 for Deto Bus Terminal via Uehommachi Rokuchome and Katsuyama Sanchome / for Namba

Uehommachi Rokuchome (Osaka City Bus)
see Osaka Uehommachi Station
