= Shitennōji-mae Yūhigaoka Station =

Metro station in Osaka, Japan

Coordinates: 34.6584°N 135.5139°E

Shitennoji-mae Yuhigaoka Station 四天王寺前夕陽ヶ丘駅
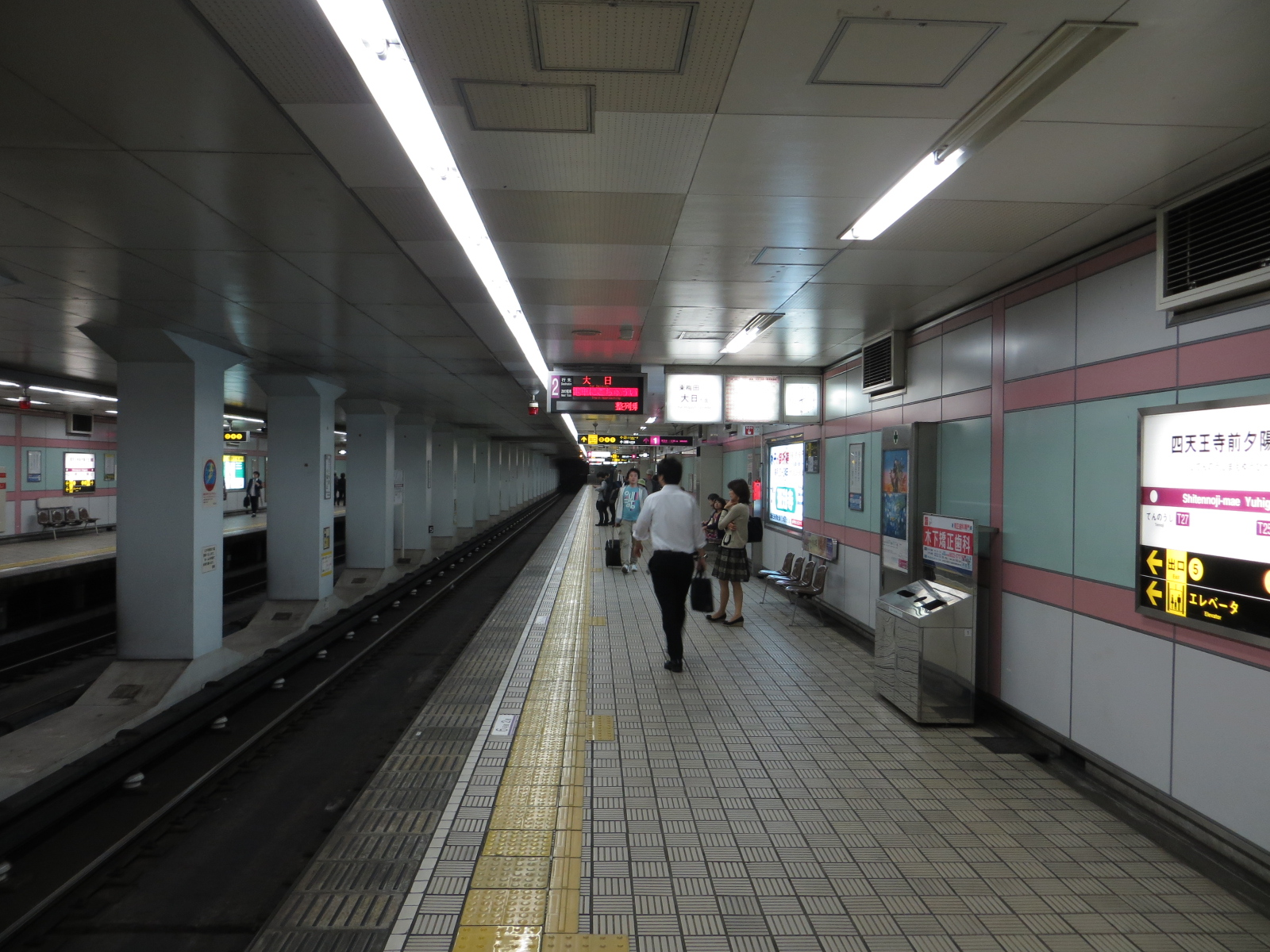
- Platform

General information
- System: Osaka Metro
- Operator: Osaka Metro
- Line: Tanimachi Line
- Platforms: 2 side platforms
- Tracks: 2

Construction
- Structure type: Underground

Other information
- Station code: T 26

History
- Opened: 17 December 1968; 57 years ago
- Former names: Shitennoji-mae (1968–1997)

Services
Preceding station	Osaka Metro	Following station
Tanimachi Kyūchōme T 25 towards Dainichi	Tanimachi Line	Tennōji T 27 towards Yaominami
Location
- Location within Osaka Prefecture Location within Japan

Shitennoji-mae Yuhigaoka Station (四天王寺前夕陽ヶ丘駅, Shitennōji-mae Yūhigaoka-eki; T26) is a metro station on the Osaka Metro Tanimachi Line in Tennoji-ku, Osaka, Japan.

== History ==
- December 17, 1968: "Shitennoji-mae (Yuhigaoka) Station" opened.
- August 29, 1997: renamed "Shitennoji-mae Yuhigaoka Station".

== Layout ==
There are two side platforms with two tracks on the first basement.

1	■ Tanimachi Line	for Tennoji, Fuminosato and Yaominami
2	■ Tanimachi Line	for Higashi-Umeda, Miyakojima and Dainichi

== Surroundings ==
- Shitennō-ji
- Tennoji Police Station
- Osaka Immigration Office, Tennoji Branch
