= Nakazakichō Station =

Metro station in Osaka, Japan

Coordinates: 34.7068°N 135.5053°E

Nakazakicho Station 中崎町駅
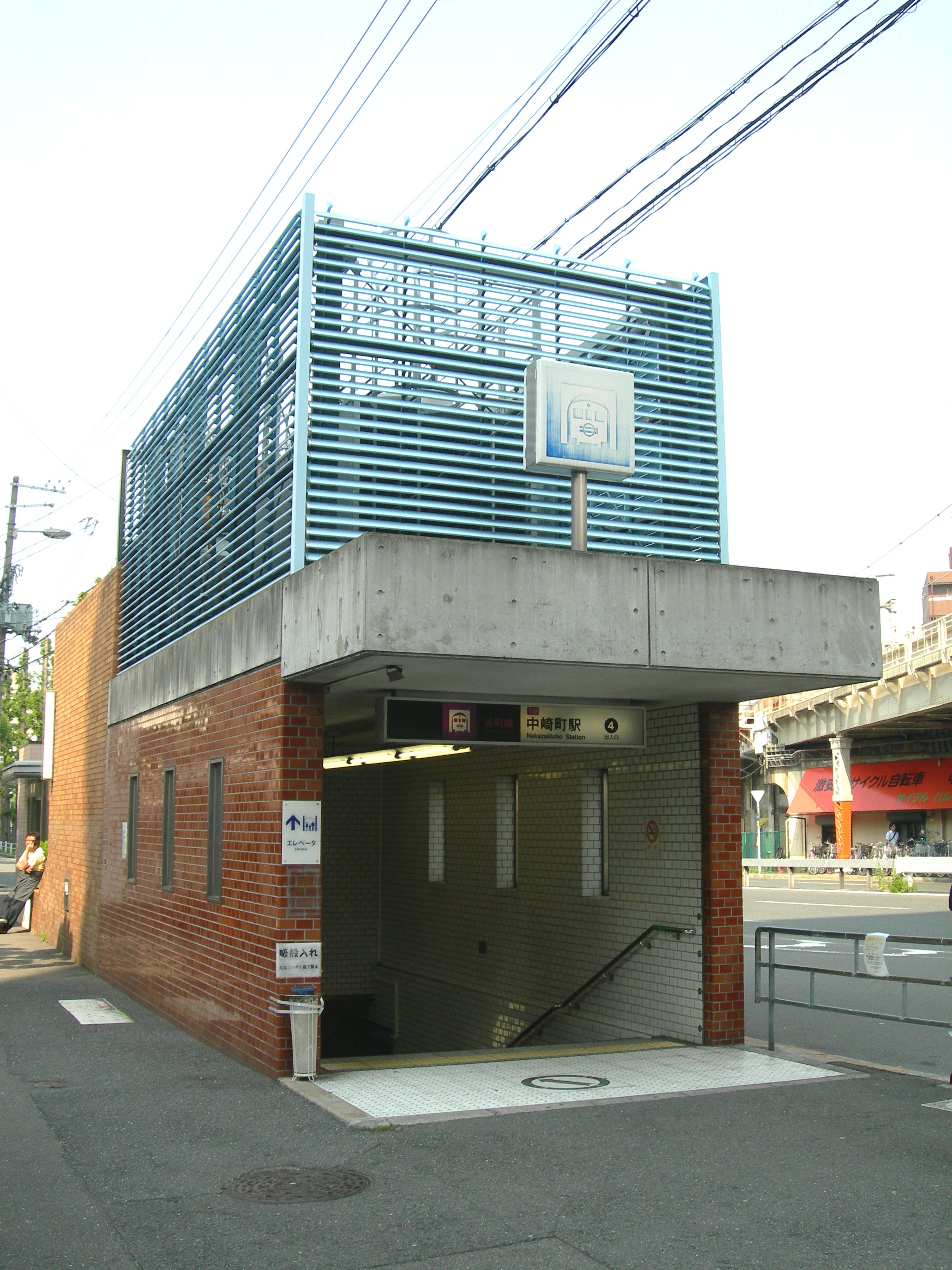
- Station entrance (2011)

General information
- System: Osaka Metro
- Operator: Osaka Metro
- Line: Tanimachi Line
- Platforms: 1 island platform
- Tracks: 2

Construction
- Structure type: Underground

Other information
- Station code: T 19

History
- Opened: 29 May 1974; 52 years ago

Services
Preceding station	Osaka Metro	Following station
Tenjimbashisuji Rokuchōme T 18 towards Dainichi	Tanimachi Line	Higashi-Umeda T 20 towards Yaominami
Location
- Location within Osaka Prefecture Location within Japan

Nakazakicho Station (中崎町駅, Nakazakichō-eki; T19) is a metro station on the Osaka Metro Tanimachi Line in Kita-ku, Osaka, Japan.

== Layout ==
- There is an island platform with 2 tracks underground.

1	■ Tanimachi Line	for Higashi-Umeda, Tennoji and Yaominami
2	■ Tanimachi Line	for Miyakojima and Dainichi

== Surroundings ==
- the headquarters of Yamahisa Co., Ltd.
- Hotel Daitoyo
- Tengo Nakazaki Shopping Arcade
