= Komagawa-Nakano Station =

Metro station in Osaka, Japan

Coordinates: 34°37′17.40″N 135°31′58.93″E

Komagawa-Nakano Station 駒川中野駅
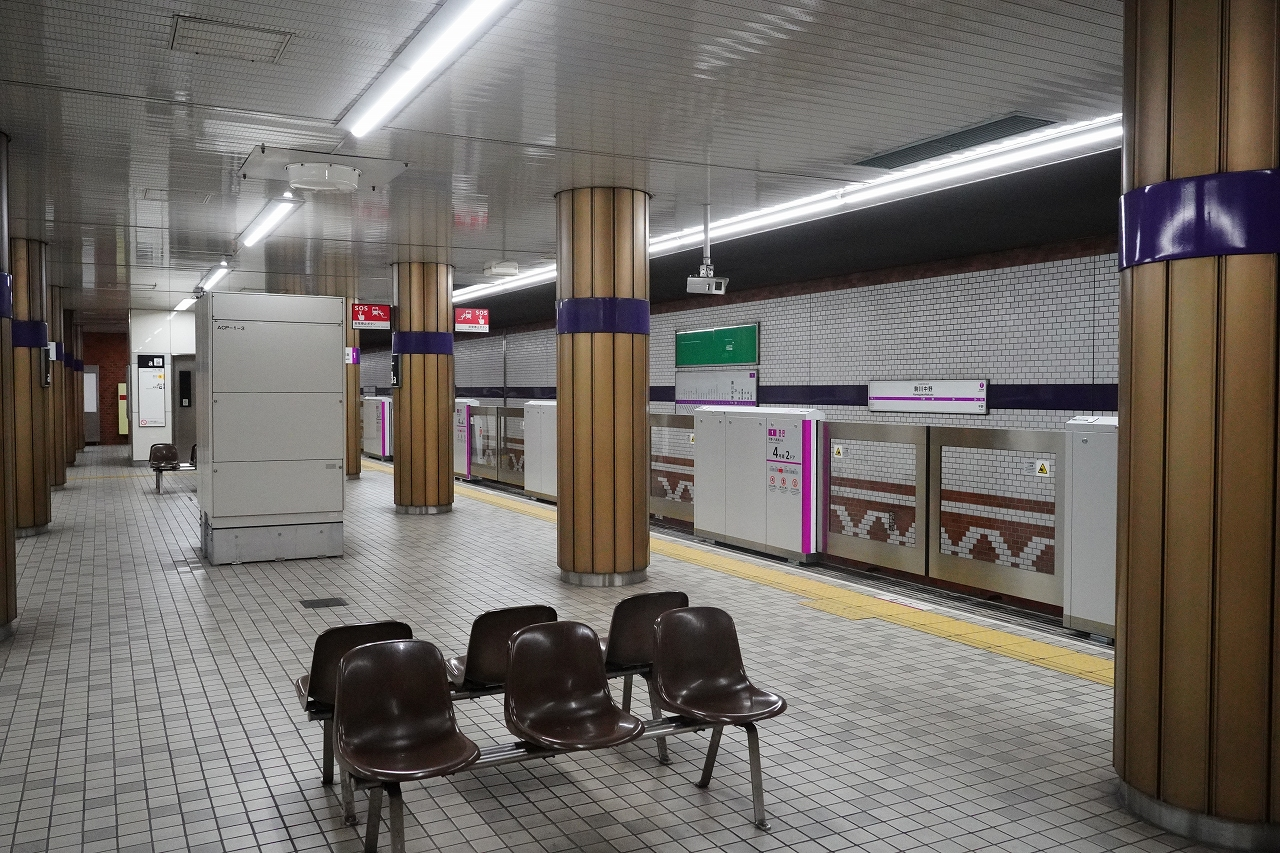
- Station platform, february 2026

General information
- System: Osaka Metro
- Operator: Osaka Metro
- Line: Tanimachi Line
- Platforms: 1 island platform
- Tracks: 2

Construction
- Structure type: Underground

Other information
- Station code: T 31

History
- Opened: 27 November 1980; 45 years ago

Services
Preceding station	Osaka Metro	Following station
Tanabe T 30 towards Dainichi	Tanimachi Line	Hirano T 32 towards Yaominami
Location
- Location within Osaka Prefecture Location within Japan

Komagawa-Nakano Station (駒川中野駅, -eki; T31) is a train station on the Osaka Metro Tanimachi Line in Harinakano Itchome, Higashisumiyoshi-ku, Osaka, Japan.

== Layout ==
- There is an island platform with two tracks on the second basement.

1	■ Tanimachi Line	for Yaominami
2	■ Tanimachi Line	for Tennoji, Higashi-Umeda and Dainichi

== Surroundings ==
- Komagawa Shopping Arcade (駒川商店街)
- Osaka Municipal Higashisumiyoshi Library
- Osaka Municipal Nakano Junior High School

=== Bus stop ===
Komagawa, Subway Komagawa-Nakano (Osaka City Bus)
- Route 3: for Subway Suminoekoen / for Deto Bus Terminal
