= Deto Station =

Metro station in Osaka, Japan

Coordinates: 34°36′32″N 135°33′58″E

Deto Station 出戸駅
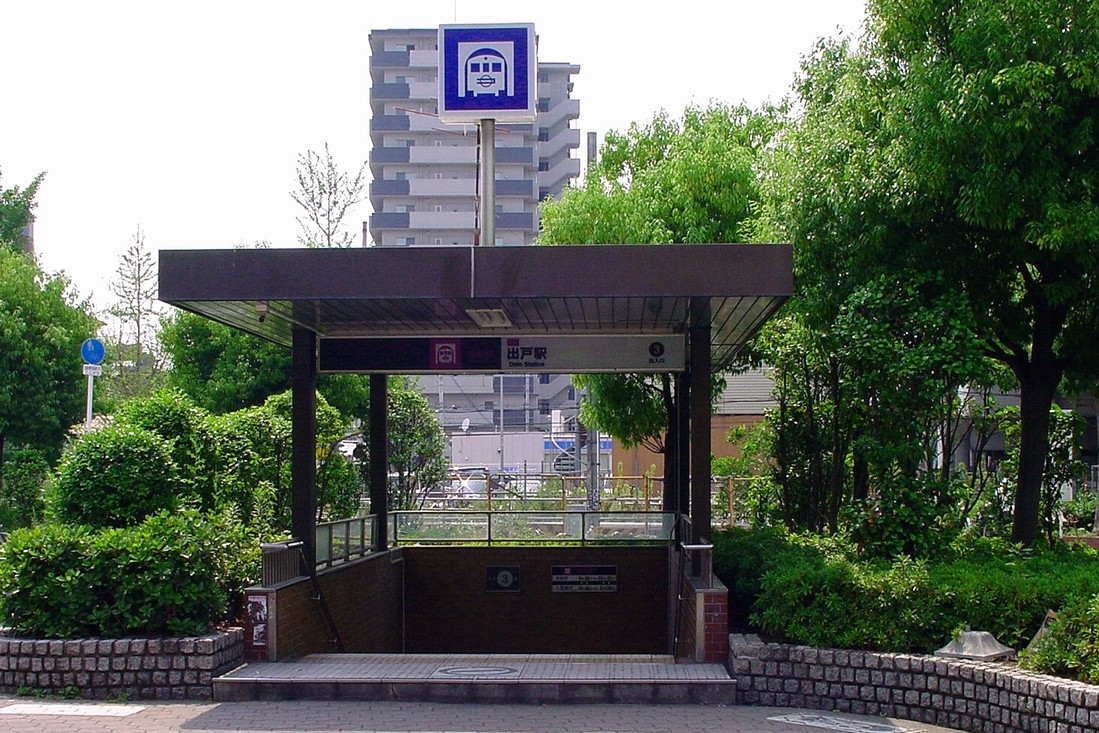
- Station entrance

General information
- System: Osaka Metro
- Operator: Osaka Metro
- Line: Tanimachi Line
- Platforms: 1 island platform
- Tracks: 2

Other information
- Station code: T 34

History
- Opened: 27 November 1980; 45 years ago

Services
Preceding station	Osaka Metro	Following station
Kire-Uriwari T 33 towards Dainichi	Tanimachi Line	Nagahara T 35 towards Yaominami
Location
- Location within Osaka Prefecture Location within Japan

Deto Station (出戸駅, Deto-eki; T34) is a metro station on the Osaka Metro Tanimachi Line located in Hirano-ku, Osaka, Japan.

== Layout ==
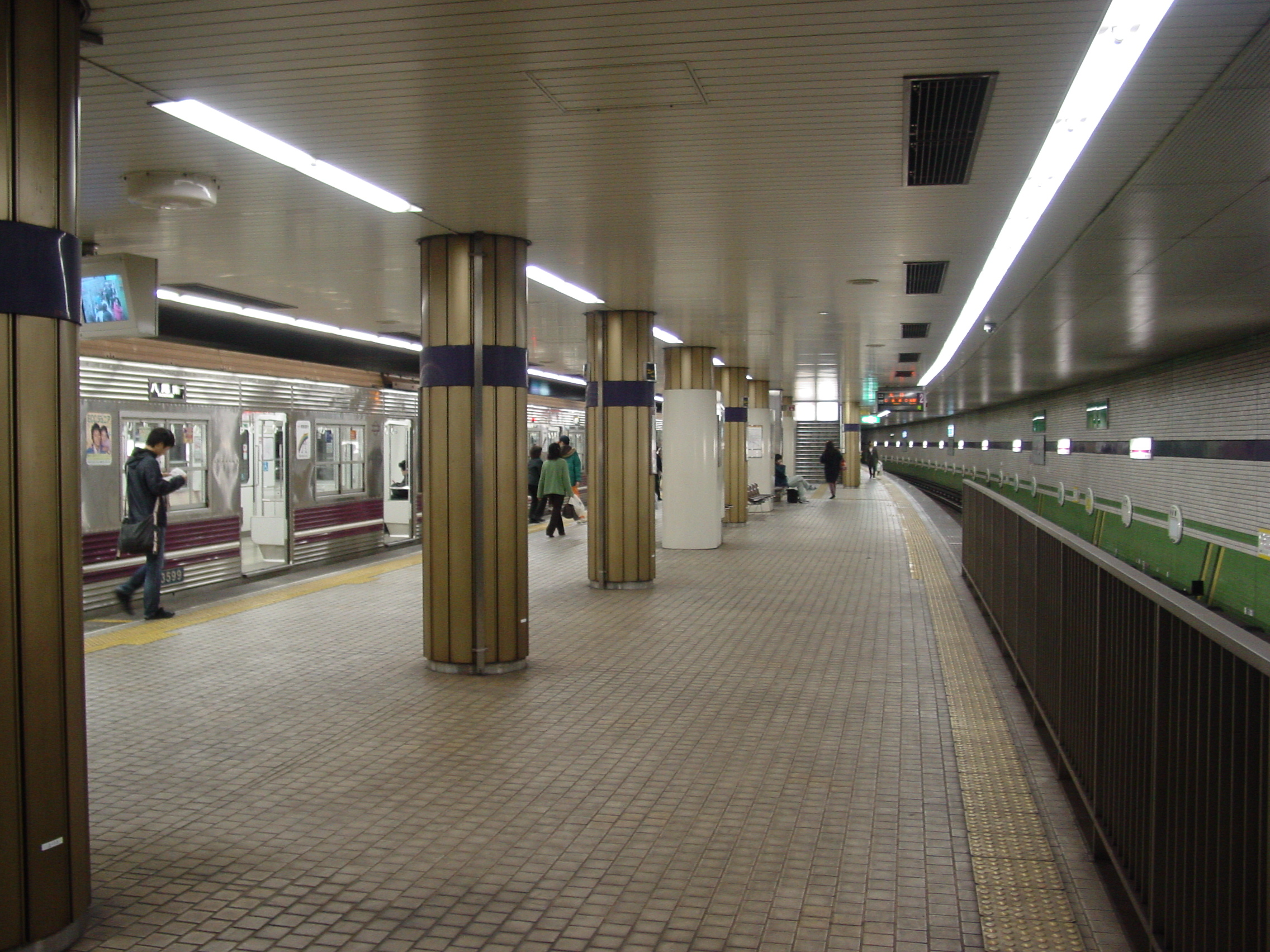
Station platform

The station has an island platform serving 2 tracks underground.

1	■ Tanimachi Line	for Yaominami
2	■ Tanimachi Line	for Tennoji, Higashi-Umeda and Dainichi

== Surroundings ==
- Daiei
- Nagayoshi Park
- Nagahara Ruins

=== Deto Bus Terminal ===
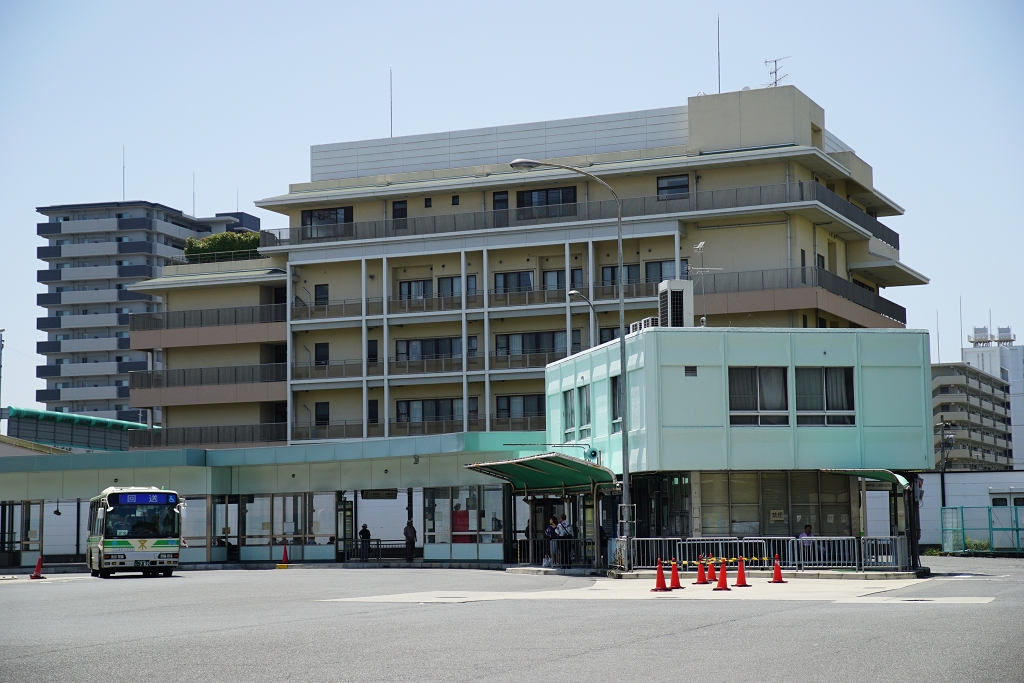
Deto Bus Terminal

Osaka City Bus

- Bus stop 1
  - Route 61A for Nagayoshi Shogakko-mae and Nagayoshi-Rokutan
  - Route 61B for Nishi-Deto and Nagayoshi-Rokutan
  - Route 61C for Nagayoshi Shogakko-mae, Nagayoshi-Rokutan and Craft Park
  - Route 61D for Nishi-Deto, Craft Park and Nagayoshi-Rokutan
  - Route 9 for Hirano Kuyakusho-mae via Kami-minami and Hirano-Miyamachi Nichome
- Bus stop 2
  - Route 1 for Abeobashi via Hirano-Miyamachi Nichome
  - Route 2 for Nagayoshi-Nagahara-higashi Sanchome
- Bus stop 3
  - Route 3 for Subway Suminoekoen via Kire-higashiguchi and Subway Hirano
  - Route 73 for Namba via Hirano Sports Center and Subway Hirano
- Bus stop 4
  - Route 4 for Subway Suminoekoen via Subway Kire-Uriwari and Subway Nagai
  - Route 14 for Koya-ohashi via Subway Kire-Uriwari
- Bus stop 5
  - Route 16 for Uriwari-higashi Hatchome
  - Route 33 for Nagayoshi-Kawanabe Yonchome via Nagayoshi Koko-mae
