= Hirano Station (Osaka Metro) =

Metro station in Osaka, Japan

Hirano Station 平野駅
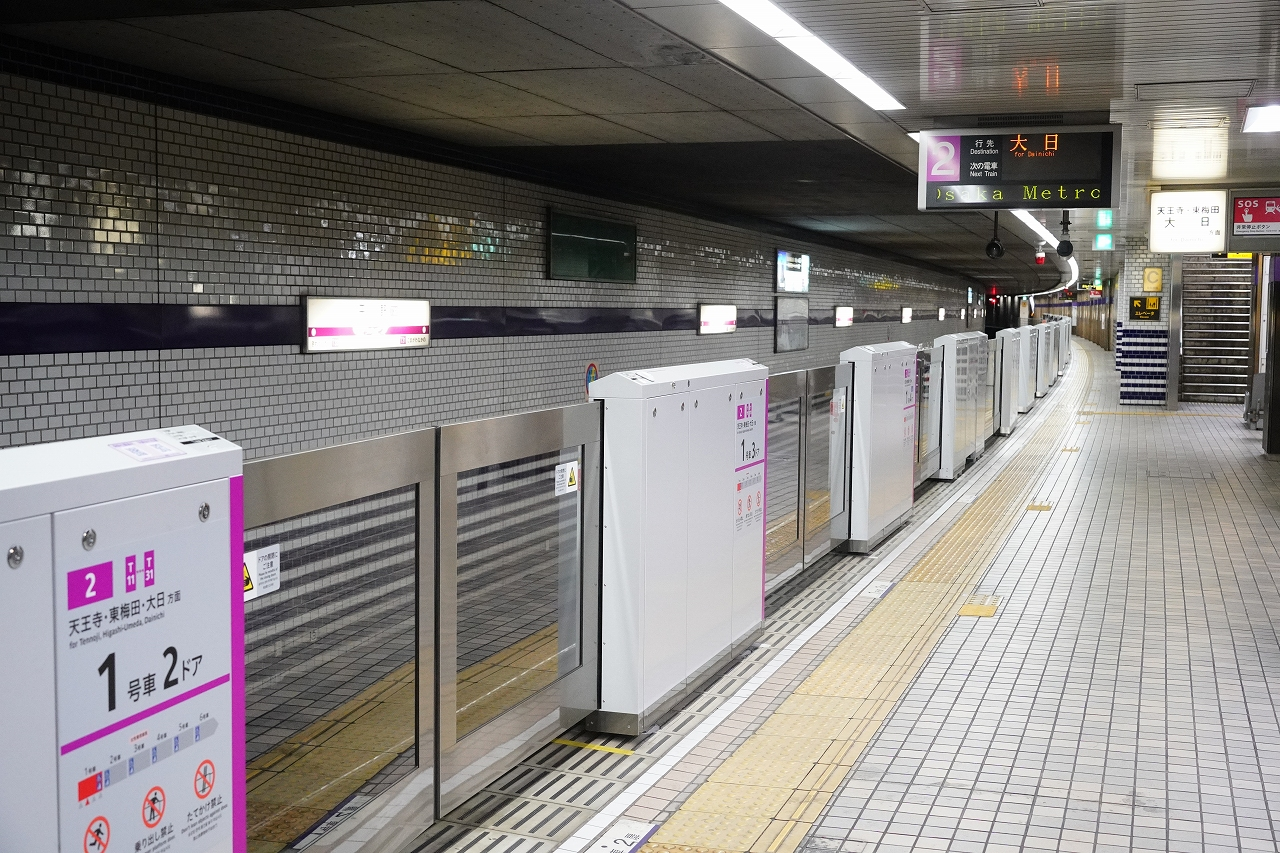
- Hirano Station platform, february 2026

General information
- Location: 5-2, Hirano-nishi, Hirano, Osaka, Osaka （大阪市平野区平野西5-2） Japan
- Coordinates: 34°37′16″N 135°32′56″E
- System: Osaka Metro
- Operator: Osaka Metro
- Line: Tanimachi Line
- Platforms: 1 island platform
- Tracks: 2
- Connections: Bus terminal

Construction
- Structure type: Underground

Other information
- Station code: T 32

History
- Opened: 1980

Services
Preceding station	Osaka Metro	Following station
Komagawa-Nakano T 31 towards Dainichi	Tanimachi Line	Kire-Uriwari T 33 towards Yaominami
Location
- Location within Osaka Prefecture Location within Japan

Hirano Station (平野駅, Hirano-eki; Station Number: T32) is a subway station in the Hirano-ku ward, city of Osaka, Osaka Prefecture, Japan.

== Line ==
Osaka Metro:
Tanimachi Line

== Layout ==
This station is located under Japan National Route 479, Osaka Prefectural Route 5 (Nanko-dori Street), and Hanshin Expressway Route 14 Matsubara Line. The station has an island platform serving two tracks.

1	■ Tanimachi Line	for Yaominami
2	■ Tanimachi Line	for Tennoji, Higashi-Umeda and Dainichi
