= Osaka Metro Line 9 =

Planned rapid transit line in Japan

Osaka Metro Line 9 (大阪メトロ9号線, Ōsaka Metoro Kyū-gō-sen) is a planned, but as-yet unbuilt, rapid transit line that would run from Suminoekōen in Suminoe-ku to Kire-Uriwari in Hirano-ku within the city of Osaka. While no timetable has been announced for its construction, it has the provisional name "Shikitsu-Nagayoshi Line" (敷津長吉線).

== Overview ==
Of the nine planned subway lines in Osaka subway, this is the only one that has not yet started any construction. If it is constructed as planned, it would be the only other subway line apart from the Imazatosuji Line to pass completely outside the Osaka Loop Line.

Line 9's planned route is in the southern part of Osaka city (specifically, Suminoe-ku, Sumiyoshi-ku, Higashisumiyoshi-ku, and Hirano-ku). Despite the high volume of road traffic, it has relatively inconvenient east–west mass transit compared to other parts of Osaka: most buses divert from the route at Sentai or Nagai, requiring several transfers to go any significant distance. As a result, the construction of this line has long been the hope of area residents.

Apart from its planned route (under Nagaikōen-dōri) and connecting stations already existing (or planned) on other lines, relatively little is set in stone. An automated guideway transit system (effectively an extension of the Nankō Port Town Line) was initially suggested, but space considerations mean that the line, if built, will likely be a more traditional underground railway utilizing narrow cross-section, linear motor-powered trains like those on the Nagahori Tsurumi-ryokuchi Line and Imazatosuji Line.

== Construction prospects ==
In the 10th report of the Transport Policy Committee in 1989, it was listed as a "route to be considered for future construction" (今後整備を検討すべき路線), but it was not included in the list of "mid-long-term prospective new lines to build out the railway network" (中長期的に望まれる鉄道ネットワークを構成する新たな路線) in the October 2004 report of the Kinki Regional Transport Committee.

With both Osaka and its Municipal Transportation Bureau being in the middle of a very tight financial situation, the planned southern extension of the Imazatosuji Line has been postponed indefinitely; under these conditions, it seems unlikely that another line passing completely outside the city center, without any major passenger draw along its route, and with little foreseeable demand outside of morning and evening rush hour, will stand much chance of completion in the near-term. Even in the planning stages, it was not anticipated to become profitable. Because of these factors, it has only been planned in broad strokes, and debate about its finer details has yet to occur. Furthermore, as the Municipal Transportation Bureau was privatized in 2017, it is possible that its ultimate fate will be decided by Osaka Rapid Electric Tramway, K.K. (known as Osaka Metro).

== Planned connections ==
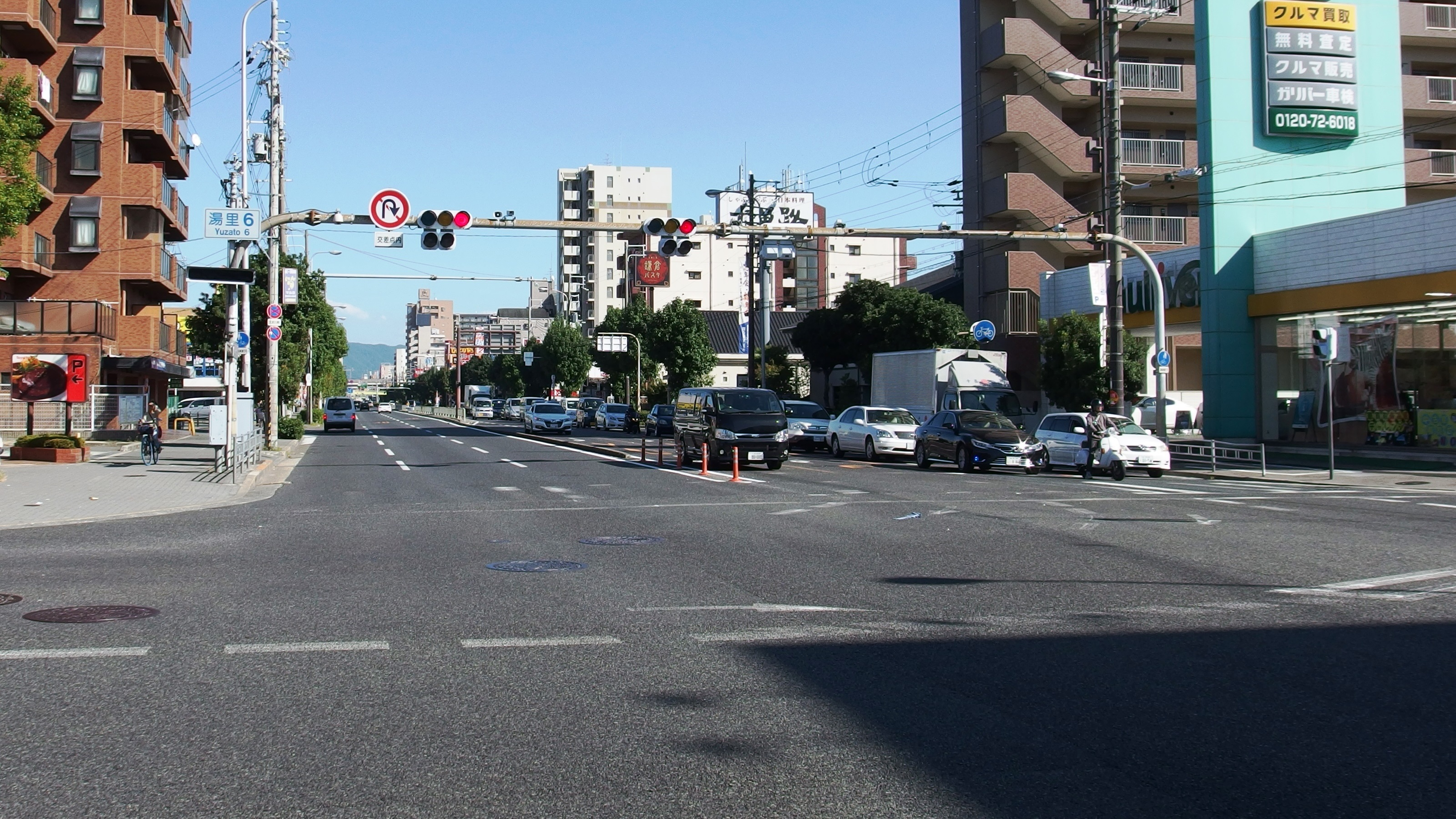
Planned location of Yuzato Rokuchōme Station (facing east toward Kire-Uriwari Station)

- Suminoekōen: Yotsubashi Line, Nankō Port Town Line
- Nagai: Midōsuji Line, JR Hanwa Line
- Yuzato Rokuchōme (tentative name): Imazatosuji Line (planned extension)
- Kire-Uriwari: Tanimachi Line

The line would also pass under the Nankai Main Line, Hankai Tramway Hankai Line, Nankai Kōya Line, and Kintetsu Minami Osaka Line, but these lines do not have a station adjoining the route along Nagaikōen-dōri.
