= Kire-Uriwari Station =

Metro station in Osaka, Japan

Coordinates: 34.6095°N 135.5519°E

Kire-Uriwari Station 喜連瓜破駅
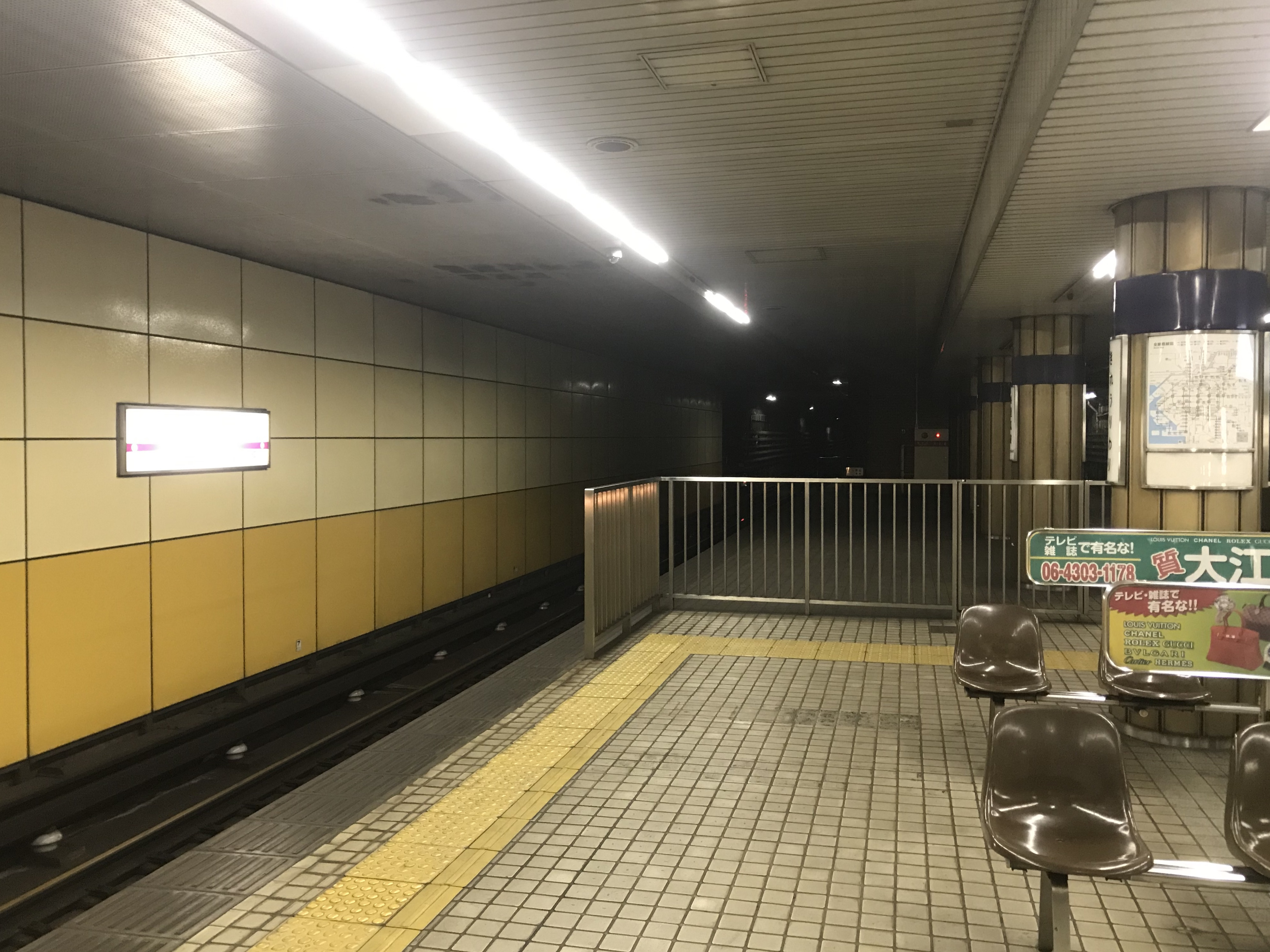

General information
- System: Osaka Metro
- Operator: Osaka Metro
- Line: Tanimachi Line
- Platforms: 1 island platform
- Tracks: 2

Construction
- Structure type: Underground

Other information
- Station code: T 33

History
- Opened: 27 November 1980; 45 years ago

Services
Preceding station	Osaka Metro	Following station
Hirano T 32 towards Dainichi	Tanimachi Line	Deto T 34 towards Yaominami
Location
- Location within Osaka Prefecture Location within Japan

Kire-Uriwari Station (喜連瓜破駅, Kire-Uriwari-eki; extra-station number: T33) is a metro station on the Osaka Metro Tanimachi Line located in Hirano-ku, Osaka, Japan.

If the long-planned Osaka Metro Line 9 is built as envisioned, Kire-Uriwari Station would become its eastern terminus and also an interchange station.

== Layout ==
This station has an island platform serving two tracks under Nagai-koen-dori Street, and a returning track in the east of the platform.

1	■ Tanimachi Line	for Yaominami
2	■ Tanimachi Line	for Tennoji, Higashi-Umeda and Dainichi
