= Tanabe Station =

Metro station in Osaka, Japan

Coordinates: 34.6285°N 135.5255°E

Tanabe Station 田辺駅
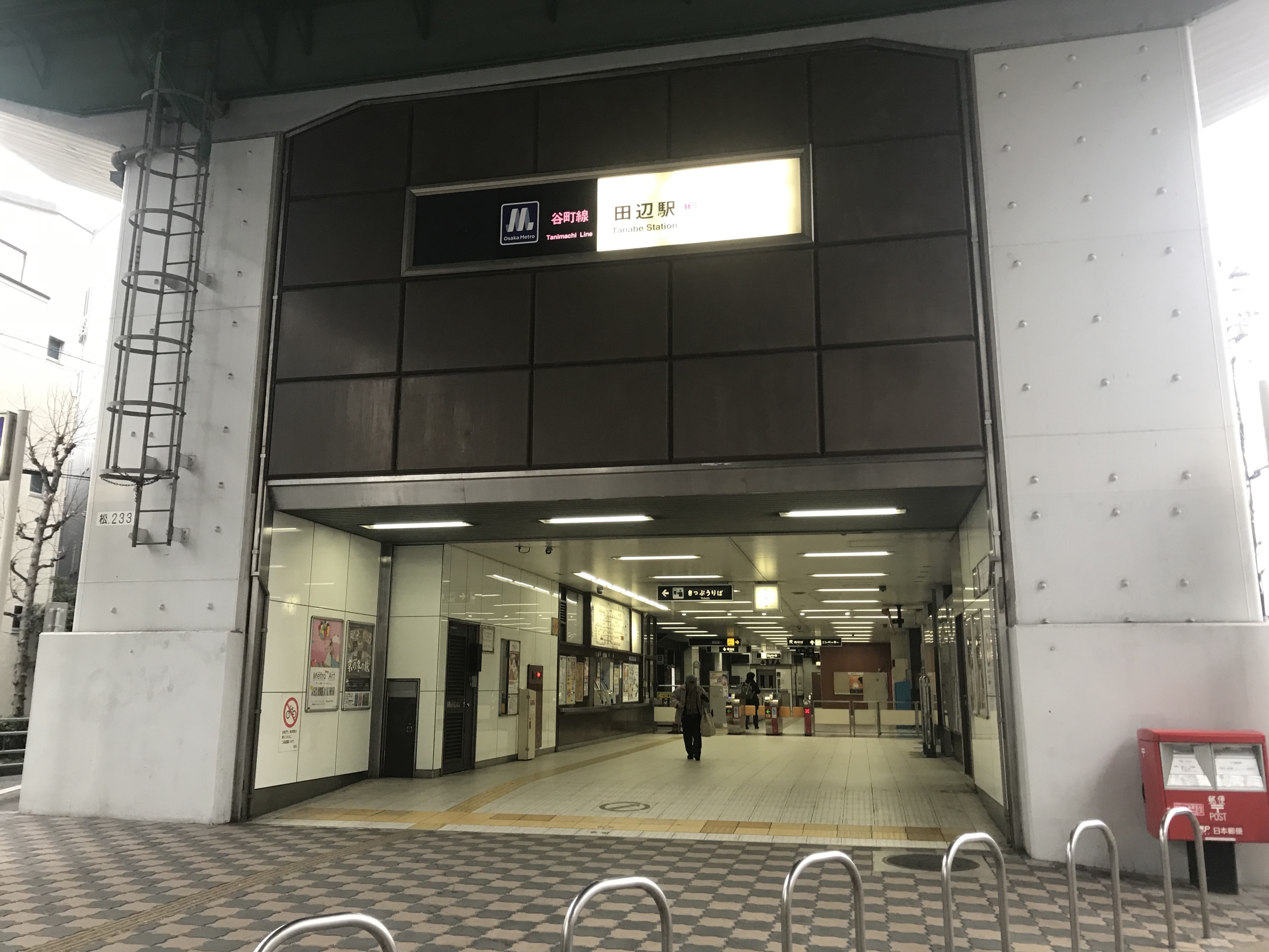
- Entrance

General information
- System: Osaka Metro
- Operator: Osaka Metro
- Line: Tanimachi Line
- Platforms: 1 island platform
- Tracks: 2

Construction
- Structure type: Underground

Other information
- Station code: T 30

History
- Opened: 27 November 1980; 45 years ago

Services
Preceding station	Osaka Metro	Following station
Fuminosato T 29 towards Dainichi	Tanimachi Line	Komagawa-Nakano T 31 towards Yaominami
Location
- Location within Osaka Prefecture Location within Japan

Tanabe Station (田辺駅, Tanabe-eki; Station Number: T30) is a train station on the Osaka Metro Tanimachi Line located in Higashisumiyoshi-ku, Osaka, Japan.

== Layout ==
There is an island platform with two tracks on the second basement.

1	■ Tanimachi Line	for Yaominami
2	■ Tanimachi Line	for Tennoji, Higashi-Umeda and Dainichi

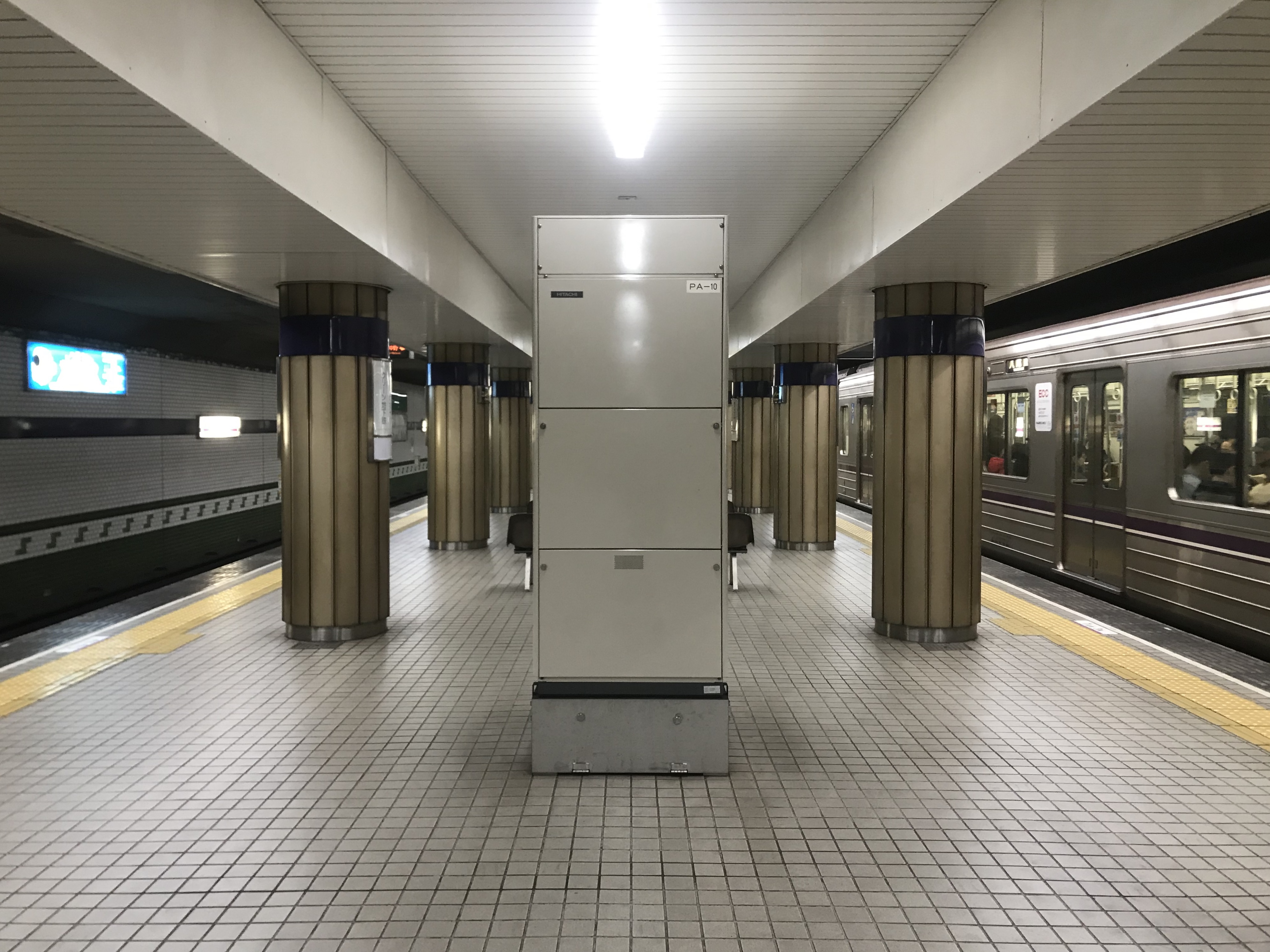
Platforms (2019)
