= Moriguchi Station (Osaka) =

Metro station in Moriguchi, Osaka Prefecture, Japan

Moriguchi Station 守口駅
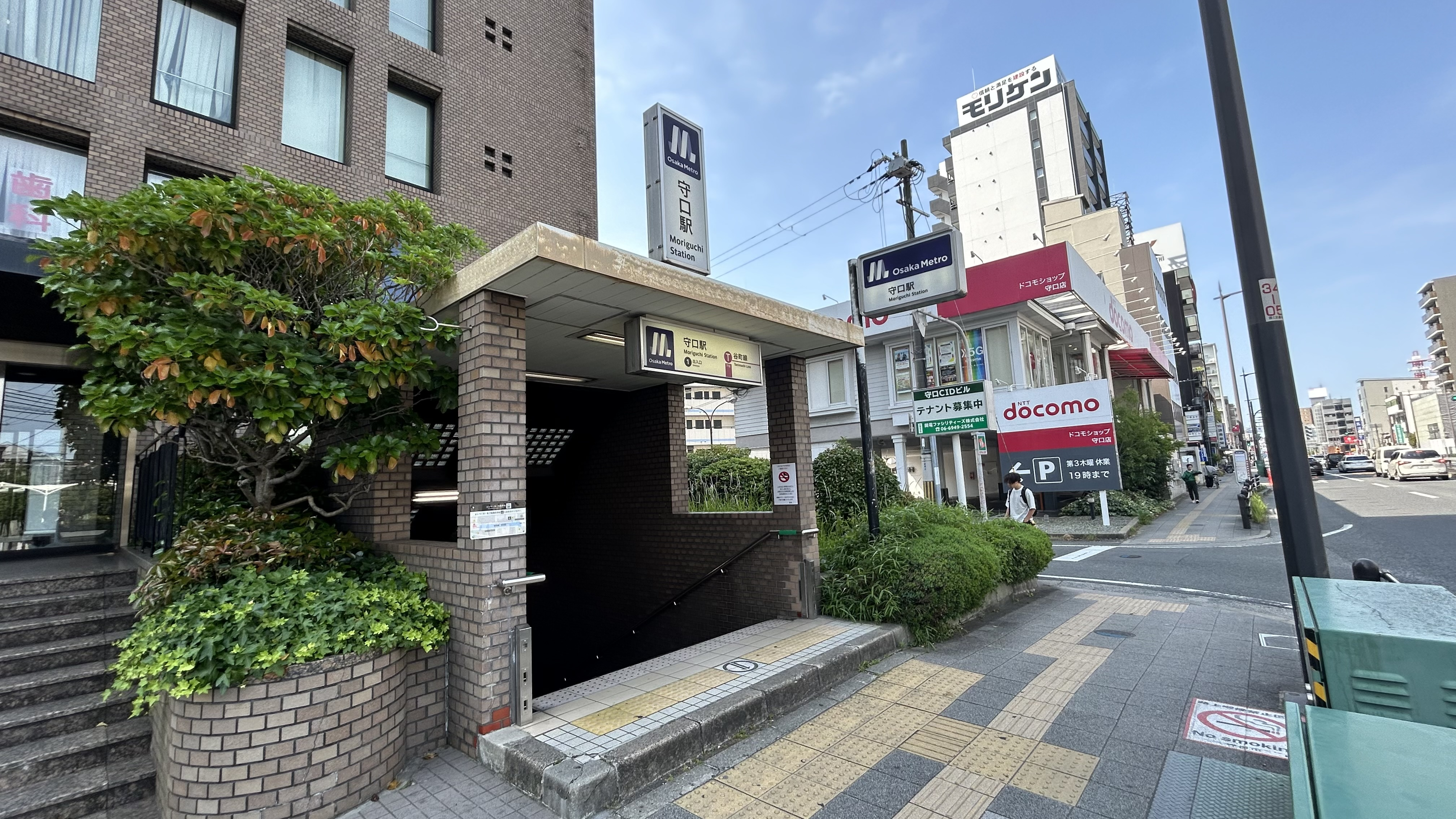
- Moriguchi Station entrance

General information
- Location: 2^Chome Keihanhondori, Moriguchi-shi, Osaka^fu
- Coordinates: 34.7379°N 135.5639°E
- System: Osaka Metro
- Operator: Osaka Metro
- Line: Tanimachi Line
- Distance: 1.8 km (1.1 miles) from Dainichi
- Platforms: 1 island platform
- Tracks: 2 (double-track)

Other information
- Status: Staffed
- Station code: T 12
- Website: Official website

History
- Opened: 6 April 1977; 49 years ago

Passengers
- FY2019: 15,445 daily

Services
Preceding station	Osaka Metro	Following station
Dainichi T 11 Terminus	Tanimachi Line	Taishibashi-Imaichi T 13 towards Yaominami
Location
- Location within Osaka Prefecture Location within Japan

Moriguchi Station (守口駅, Moriguchi-eki; Station Number: T12) is an underground metro station located in the city of Moriguchi, Osaka, Japan, operated by Osaka Metro.

== Lines ==
Moriguchi Station is a station of the Tanimachi Line, and is located 1.8 km from the terminus of the line at Dainichi Station.

== Station layout ==
The station has one underground island platform serving two tracks and fenced with platform gates.

=== Platforms ===
1	■ Tanimachi Line	for Higashi-Umeda, Tennoji and Yaominami
2	■ Tanimachi Line	Dainichi

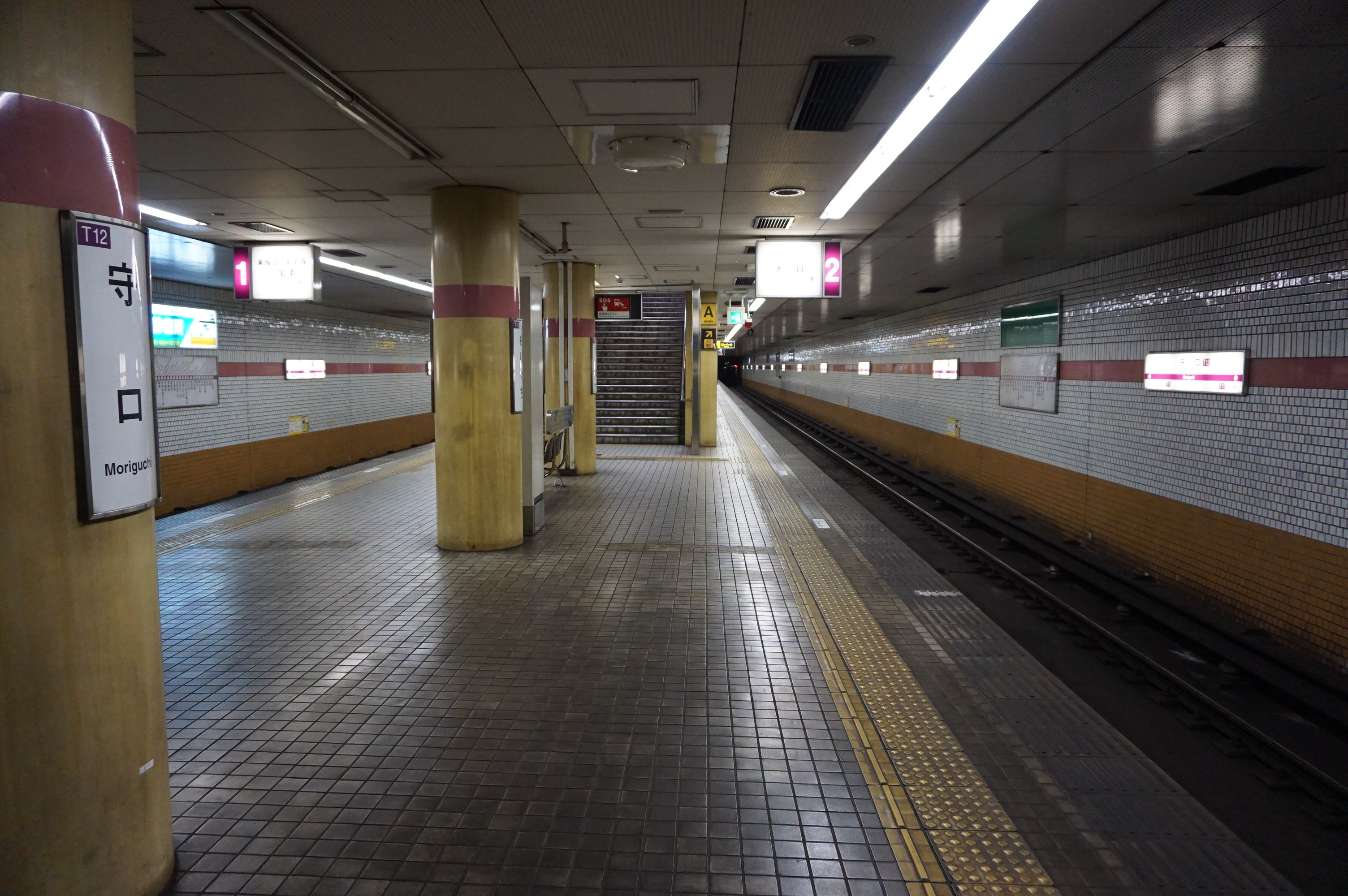
Platforms (May 2018)

== History ==
The station was opened on April 6, 1977

== Passenger statistics ==
In fiscal 2019, the station was used by an average of 15,445 passengers daily.

== Surrounding area ==
- Moriguchi City Hall
- Moriguchi City Central Public Hall
- Moriguchi Civic Center (Satsuki Hall Moriguchi)
- Osaka Prefectural Yodogawa Technical High School
- Osaka Prefectural Ashima High School

== See also ==
- List of railway stations in Japan
