= Nagahara Station (Osaka) =

Metro station in Osaka, Japan

Nagahara Station 長原駅
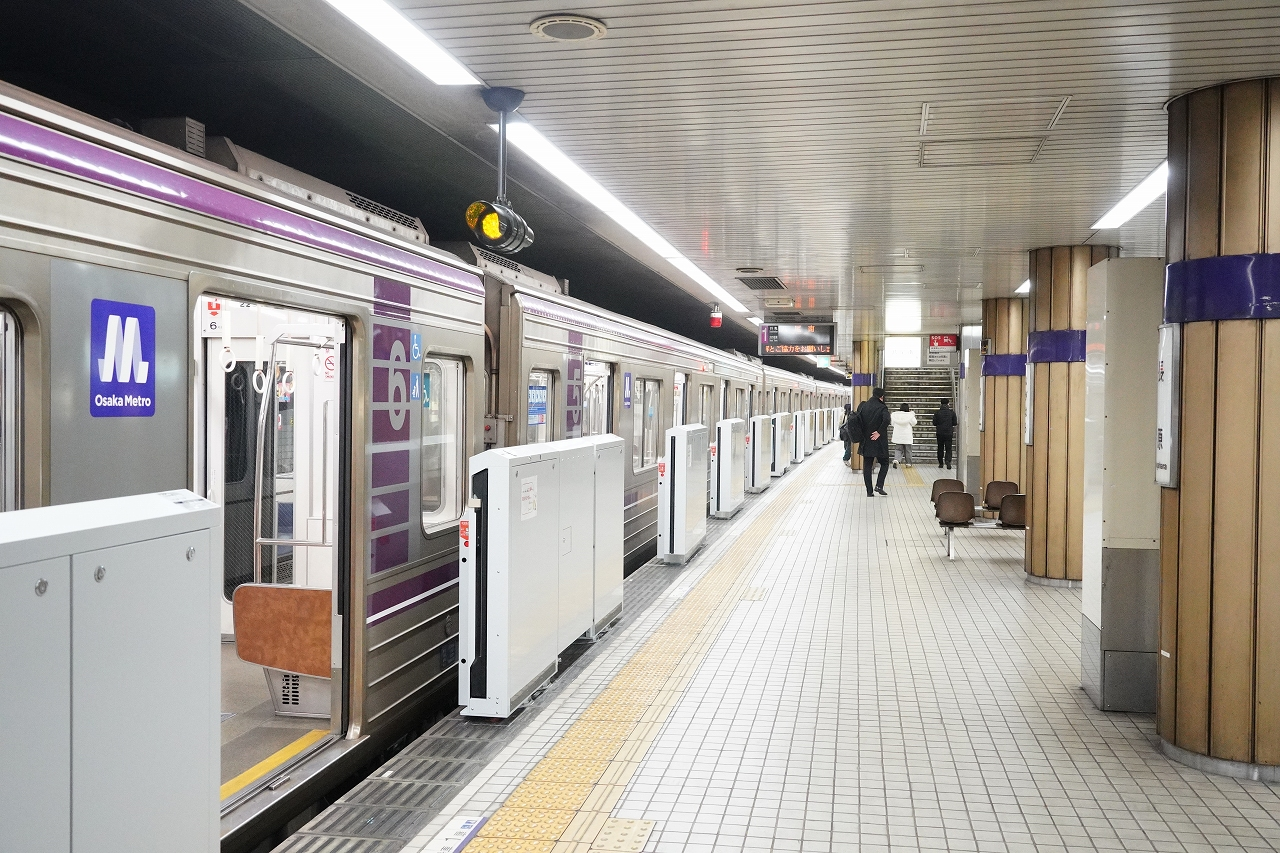
- Nagahara Station, 2026

General information
- Location: 2 Nagayoshinagahara-Higashi, Hirano, Osaka, Osaka （大阪市平野区長吉長原東二丁目） Japan
- Coordinates: 34°36′09″N 135°34′26″E
- System: Osaka Metro
- Operator: Osaka Metro
- Line: Tanimachi Line
- Platforms: 1 island platform
- Tracks: 2
- Connections: Bus stop

Construction
- Structure type: Underground

Other information
- Station code: T 35

History
- Opened: 27 November 1980; 45 years ago

Passengers
- 2007: 11,596 daily

Services
Preceding station	Osaka Metro	Following station
Deto T 34 towards Dainichi	Tanimachi Line	Yaominami T 36 Terminus
Location
- Location within Osaka Prefecture Location within Japan

Nagahara Station (長原駅, Nagahara-eki) is a train station on the Osaka Metro Tanimachi Line located in Hirano-ku, Osaka, Japan.

== Lines ==
Nagahara Station is served by the Osaka Metro Tanimachi Line (Station Number: T35)

== Layout ==
There is an island platform with two tracks underground.

1	■ Tanimachi Line	to Yaominami
2	■ Tanimachi Line	for Tennoji, Higashi-Umeda and Dainichi
