= Dainichi =

Dainichi may refer to:

- Dainichi Nyorai, the Japanese version of Vairocana, one of the Five Dhyani Buddhas
  - Dainichi, a Japanese name for the Christian God initially used by Francis Xavier, derived from the Japanese name for Vairocana
- Dainichi Station, the terminus of Osaka's Tanimachi Line (谷町線)
