= Miyakojima Station =

Metro station in Osaka, Japan

Miyakojima Station 都島駅
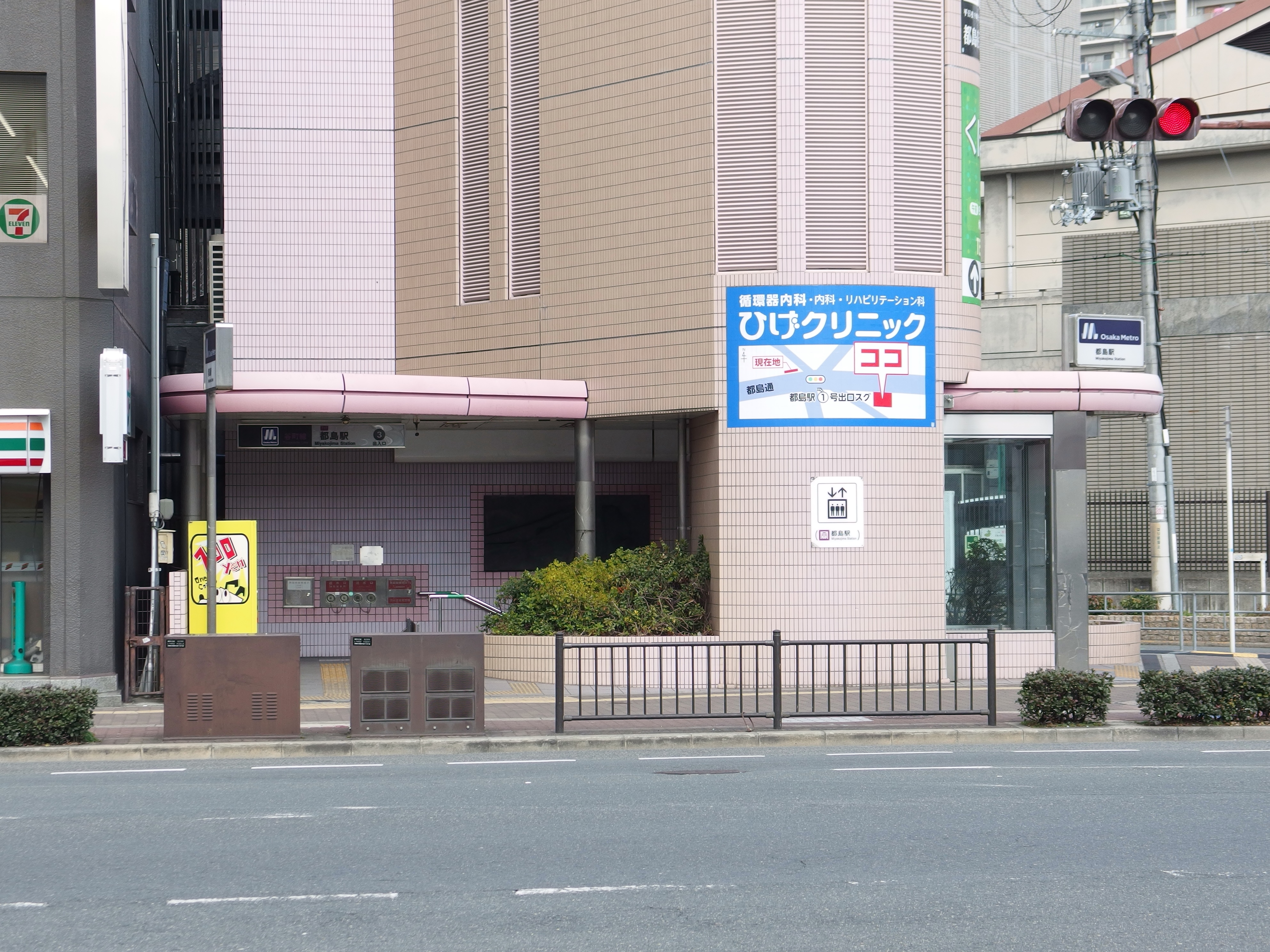
- Station entrance

General information
- Location: Miyakojima ward, Osaka; Japan
- Coordinates: 34.7090°N 135.5256°E
- System: Osaka Metro
- Operator: Osaka Metro
- Line: Tanimachi Line
- Platforms: 1 island platform
- Tracks: 2
- Connections: Osaka Loop Line (Sakuranomiya)

Construction
- Structure type: Underground

Other information
- Station code: T 17

History
- Opened: 29 May 1974; 52 years ago

Services
Preceding station	Osaka Metro	Following station
Noe-Uchindai T 16 towards Dainichi	Tanimachi Line	Tenjimbashisuji Rokuchōme T 18 towards Yaominami
Location
- Location within Osaka Prefecture Location within Japan

Miyakojima Station (都島駅, Miyakojima-eki) is a railway station on the Osaka Metro Tanimachi Line in Miyakojima-ku, Osaka, Japan. It is numbered "T17".

== Layout ==
The station has an island platform serving two tracks on the second basement ("B2F") level. Around half of the trains return for Fuminosato, Kire-Uriwari and Yaominami at this station.

=== Platforms ===
1	■ Tanimachi Line	for Higashi-Umeda, Tennoji, and Yaominami
2	■ Tanimachi Line	for Dainichi

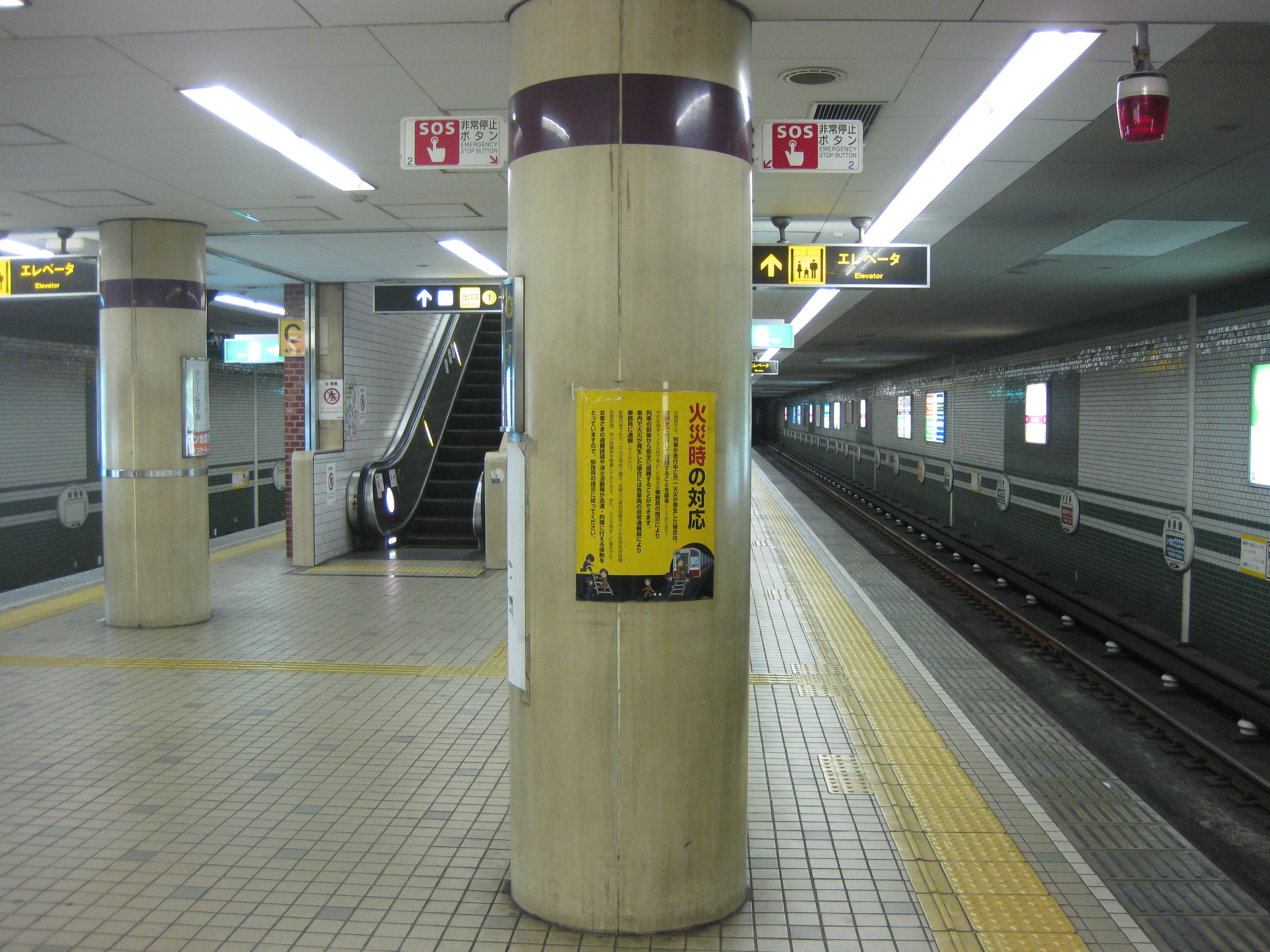
Platforms (2012)

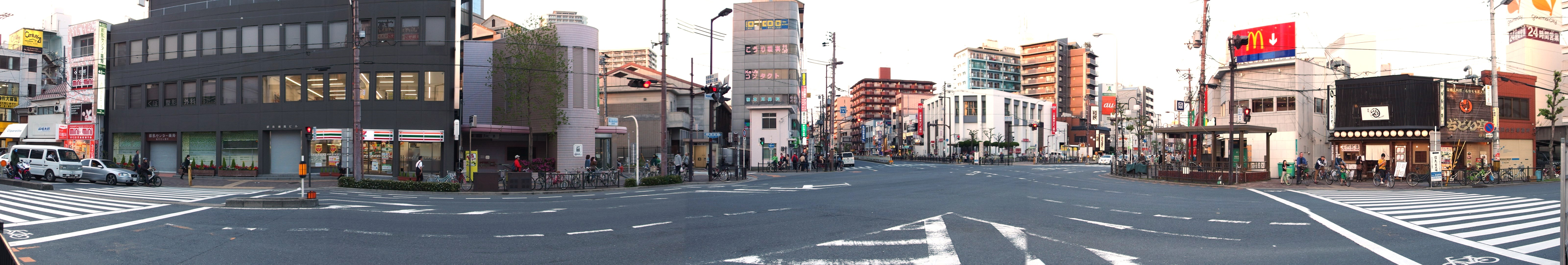

== History ==
The station opened on 29 May 1974.

== Surrounding area ==
- Osaka City General Hospital
- Miyakojima Police Station
- Sakuranomiya Station (JR West)

Another station called Miyakojima Station is under construction nearby on the Osaka Higashi Line, scheduled to open in spring 2019.

== See also ==
- List of railway stations in Japan
