= Tanimachi Line =

Metro line in Osaka prefecture, Japan

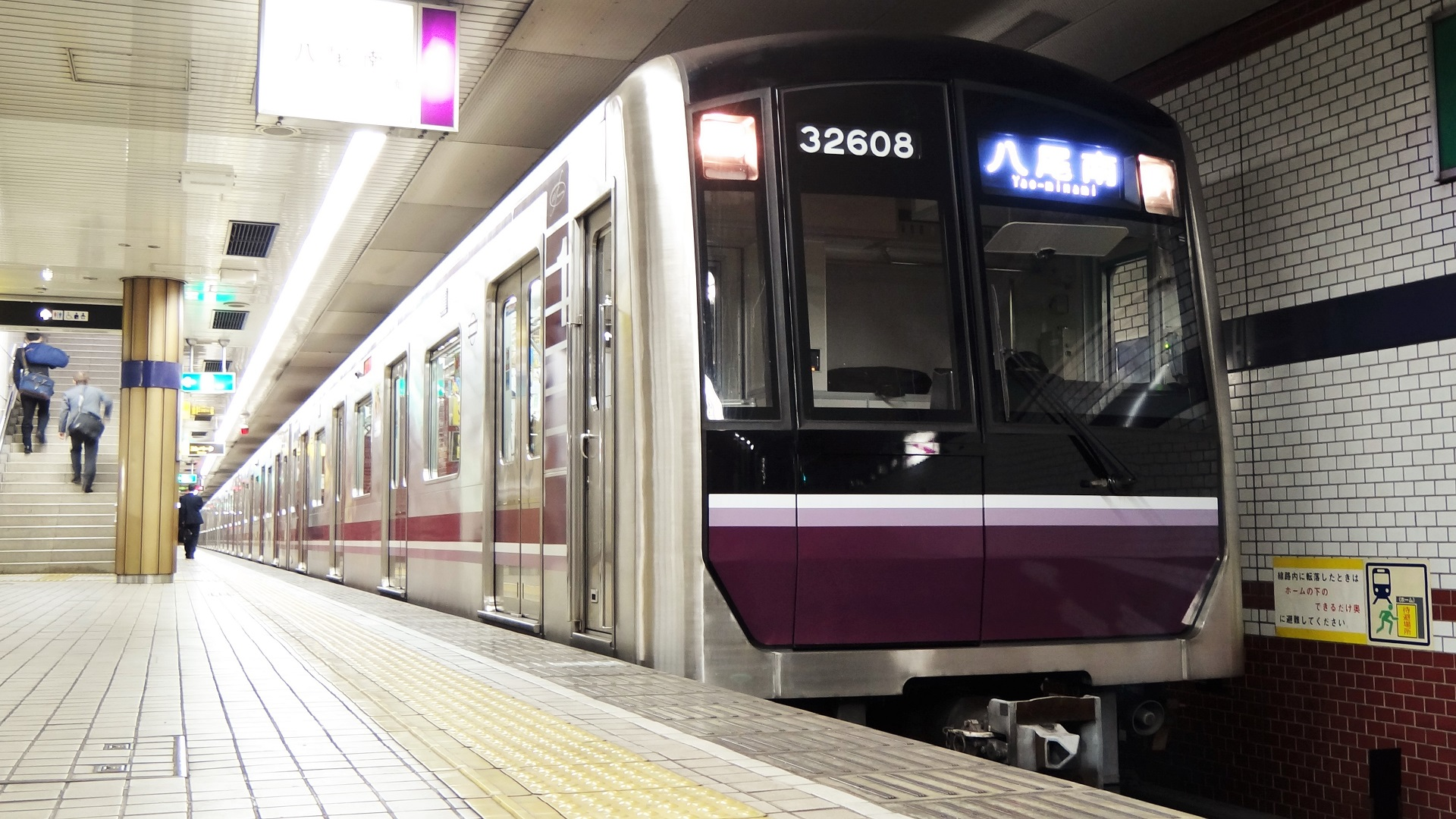
- Tanimachi Line 30000 series train in April 2015

Overview
- Native name: 谷町線
- Status: Operational
- Owner: Osaka Metro (2018–present); Osaka Municipal Transportation Bureau (1967–2018)
- Line number: 2
- Locale: Osaka; Yao; Moriguchi
- Termini: Dainichi; Yaominami
- Stations: 26
- Color on map: Royal purple (#522886)

Service
- Type: Rapid transit
- System: Osaka Metro
- Depot(s): Dainichi, Yao
- Rolling stock: 22 series, 30000 series

History
- Opened: 24 March 1967; 59 years ago
- Last extension: 1983

Technical
- Line length: 28.1 km (17.5 mi)
- Track length: 28.3 km (17.6 mi)
- Number of tracks: Double-track
- Track gauge: 1,435 mm (4 ft 8 1/2 in) standard gauge
- Electrification: 750 V DC (third rail)
- Operating speed: 70 km/h (43 mph)
- Signalling: Automatic closing block
- Train protection system: WS-ATC
Route map

The Tanimachi Line (谷町線, Tanimachi-sen) is a rapid transit line of Osaka Metro, running from Dainichi Station in Moriguchi to Yaominami Station in Yao through Osaka. Despite chronologically being the system's fourth line, its official name is Rapid Electric Tramway Line No. 2 (高速電気軌道第2号線), while the Osaka Municipal Transportation Bureau refers to it as Osaka City Rapid Railway Line No. 2 (大阪市高速鉄道第2号線), and in MLIT publications, it is written as Line No. 2 (Tanimachi Line) (2号線（谷町線）). On line maps, stations on the Tanimachi Line are indicated with the letter T.

The central part of the line runs underneath Tanimachi-suji, a broad north–south thoroughfare lined with prefectural government buildings and Buddhist temples. Its only above-ground segment is the vicinity of Yaominami Station. The line color on maps, station signs and train livery is tyrian purple (京紫, kyō-murasaki), derived from the kasaya robes worn by Buddhist monks.

== Overview ==
As noted above, the Tanimachi Line is officially "Line No. 2", but it was actually the fourth to open, after Line No. 3 (the Yotsubashi Line) during World War II and Line No. 4 (the Chūō Line) in the early 1960s. The line was opened gradually from the late 1960s to the early 1980s.

Ridership, though less than half the numbers of the busiest Midōsuji Line, is still the second-highest of all lines in the Osaka Metro network, thanks to the large number of government buildings in eastern Chūō-ku and schools around Tennōji (total ridership for fiscal year 2009 was approximately 480,000 per day). It is likely because of this also the second-most profitable subway line in Osaka (total profit for FY 2009 was ¥7.3 billion — a 9.4% increase over the previous year).

The Tanimachi Line has the longest operating distance (for the purpose of fare calculation) in the Osaka Metro network, after the Midōsuji Line (although the latter would be the longest in the Osaka Metro network if the Kita-Osaka Kyūkō Railway extension of the Midōsuji Line was taken into account). It runs completely underground from Dainichi to just before Yaominami, and was known as the longest continuously underground subway line in Japan for a long time after the opening of Yaominami Station (it was also among the longest subway tunnels in the world at the time of its opening). Now, it is fourth in Japan after the Toei Ōedo Line (entire line, 40.7 km or 25.3 mi), Saitama Rapid Railway Line/Tokyo Metro Namboku Line/Tōkyū Meguro Line (Urawa-Misono – Fudō-mae via Akabane-Iwabuchi and Meguro, 36.9 km or 22.9 mi), and Nagoya Municipal Subway Meijō Line/Meikō Line (entire line, 32.4 km or 20.1 mi).

If one considers Higashi-Umeda, Umeda, and Nishi-Umeda stations as the same station (as they are for the purpose of transfers within 30 minutes), the Tanimachi Line has connections to all other subway lines in Osaka. (By comparison, the Chūō Line is the only subway line in Osaka that connects to all other subway lines, as well as the Nankō Port Town Line.)

=== Line data ===
- Above-ground section: vicinity of Yaominami
- Blocking system: Automatic
- Train protection system: WS-ATC
- Cars per train: 6 (1976–present)
- Maximum possible cars per train (platform length): 8

For the purposes of fare calculation, the Higashi-Umeda–Tennōji segment is adjusted to the same length as Umeda–Tennōji on the Midōsuji Line.

== Stations ==
| No. | Name | Japanese | Distance (km) | Transfers | Location |
|---|---|---|---|---|---|
| T 11 | Dainichi | 大日 | 0.0 | Osaka Monorail Main Line | Moriguchi |
| T 12 | Moriguchi | 守口 | 1.8 | | Moriguchi |
| T 13 | Taishibashi-Imaichi | 太子橋今市 | 3.0 | Imazatosuji Line (I14) | Asahi-ku, Osaka |
| T 14 | Sembayashi-Omiya | 千林大宮 | 4.0 | | Asahi-ku, Osaka |
| T 15 | Sekime-Takadono | 関目高殿 | 5.1 | | Asahi-ku, Osaka |
| T 16 | Noe-Uchindai | 野江内代 | 5.9 | Keihan Main Line (Noe); F Osaka Higashi Line (JR-Noe) | Miyakojima-ku, Osaka |
| T 17 | Miyakojima | 都島 | 7.2 | | Miyakojima-ku, Osaka |
| T 18 | Tenjimbashisuji Rokuchōme | 天神橋筋六丁目 | 8.5 | Sakaisuji Line; Hankyu Senri Line (K11) | Kita-ku, Osaka |
| T 19 | Nakazakichō | 中崎町 | 9.3 | | Kita-ku, Osaka |
| T 20 | Higashi-Umeda | 東梅田 | 10.3 | Midōsuji Line (M16); Yotsubashi Line (Y11); A JR Kyōto Line (Tōkaidō Main Line); A JR Kōbe Line (Tōkaidō Main Line); G JR Takarazuka Line (Tōkaidō Main Line); O Osaka Loop Line – (Ōsaka); F Osaka Loop Line – (Ōsaka); H JR Tōzai Line – (Kitashinchi); Hankyu Kobe Line; Hankyu Kyoto Line; Hankyu Takarazuka Line); Hanshin Main Line | Kita-ku, Osaka |
| T 21 | Minami-morimachi | 南森町 | 11.5 | Sakaisuji Line (K13) | Kita-ku, Osaka |
| T 22 | Temmabashi | 天満橋 | 13.1 | Keihan Main Line; Keihan Nakanoshima Line | Chūō-ku, Osaka |
| T 23 | Tanimachi Yonchōme | 谷町四丁目 | 13.8 | Chūō Line (C18) | Chūō-ku, Osaka |
| T 24 | Tanimachi Rokuchome | 谷町六丁目 | 14.6 | Nagahori Tsurumi-ryokuchi Line (N18) | Chūō-ku, Osaka |
| T 25 | Tanimachi Kyūchōme | 谷町九丁目 | 15.5 | Sennichimae Line (S18); D Osaka Line; A Kintetsu Namba Line; A Nara Line – (Ōsaka Uehommachi) | Tennōji-ku, Osaka |
| T 26 | Shitennōji-mae Yūhigaoka | 四天王寺前夕陽ヶ丘 | 16.5 | | Tennōji-ku, Osaka |
| T 27 | Tennōji | 天王寺 | 17.6 | Midōsuji Line (M23); Q Yamatoji Line (V Kansai Line); O Osaka Loop Line; R Hanwa Line; F Minami Osaka Line – (Ōsaka Abenobashi); Hankai Uemachi Line | Tennōji-ku, Osaka |
| T 28 | Abeno | 阿倍野 | 18.2 | Hankai Uemachi Line | Abeno-ku, Osaka |
| T 29 | Fuminosato | 文の里 | 19.3 | | Abeno-ku, Osaka |
| T 30 | Tanabe | 田辺 | 20.3 | | Higashisumiyoshi-ku, Osaka |
| T 31 | Komagawa-Nakano | 駒川中野 | 21.3 | | Higashisumiyoshi-ku, Osaka |
| T 32 | Hirano | 平野 | 23.0 | | Hirano-ku, Osaka |
| T 33 | Kire-Uriwari | 喜連瓜破 | 24.4 | | Hirano-ku, Osaka |
| T 34 | Deto | 出戸 | 25.7 | | Hirano-ku, Osaka |
| T 35 | Nagahara | 長原 | 26.9 | | Hirano-ku, Osaka |
| T 36 | Yaominami | 八尾南 | 28.1 | | Yao |

== Stopping patterns ==
All trains stop at every station along their route. During the day, trains alternate between Dainichi and Yaominami, and between Miyakojima and Fuminosato, with additional trains starting or terminating at Kire-Uriwari during rush hour. As the line is quite long and goes through the center of Osaka, express service was planned, but never implemented.

Since 1976, all trains have had 6 cars. Platforms are long enough to accommodate 8-car trainsets; the unused portions are fenced.

== Women-only cars ==
Women-only cars were introduced on the line from 15 December 2003. There is one such designated car in each train (Car No. 3), the use of which is restricted on weekdays from the first train until 9 a.m. The women-only restriction is lifted after 9 a.m.

Women-only car
| ←Yaominami | Dainichi→ |
1 / 2 / 3 / 4 / 5 / 6

== Rolling stock ==
- 22 series 6-car EMUs (since 1990)
- 30000 series 6-car EMUs (since 2009)
- 30000A series 6-car EMUs (since 2025)

In 2006, in preparation for the opening of the Kintetsu Keihanna Line extension of the Chūō Line (then known as the Higashi-Osaka Line), nine 20-series trainsets of the Tanimachi Line were exchanged for nine 22-series trainsets (converted from 24-series trains) from the Chūō Line, and had their cheatlines repainted into the Tanimachi line's purple colour.

Until 2016, heavier train maintenance and inspection were carried out by the same group in charge of Chūō Line trains, at the Morinomiya depot and workshop, accessible through a spur located before Tanimachi Rokuchōme Station on the Tanimachi Line and after Tanimachi Yonchōme Station on the Chūō Line (the Dainichi and Yao depots are used mainly to store off-service trains). Since 2016, said maintenance of all third-rail-powered Osaka Metro rolling stock have been consolidated at Midorigi Depot on the Yotsubashi Line, so Tanimachi Line rolling stock are also allowed to travel on the Chūō and Yotsubashi lines to access Midorigi Depot.

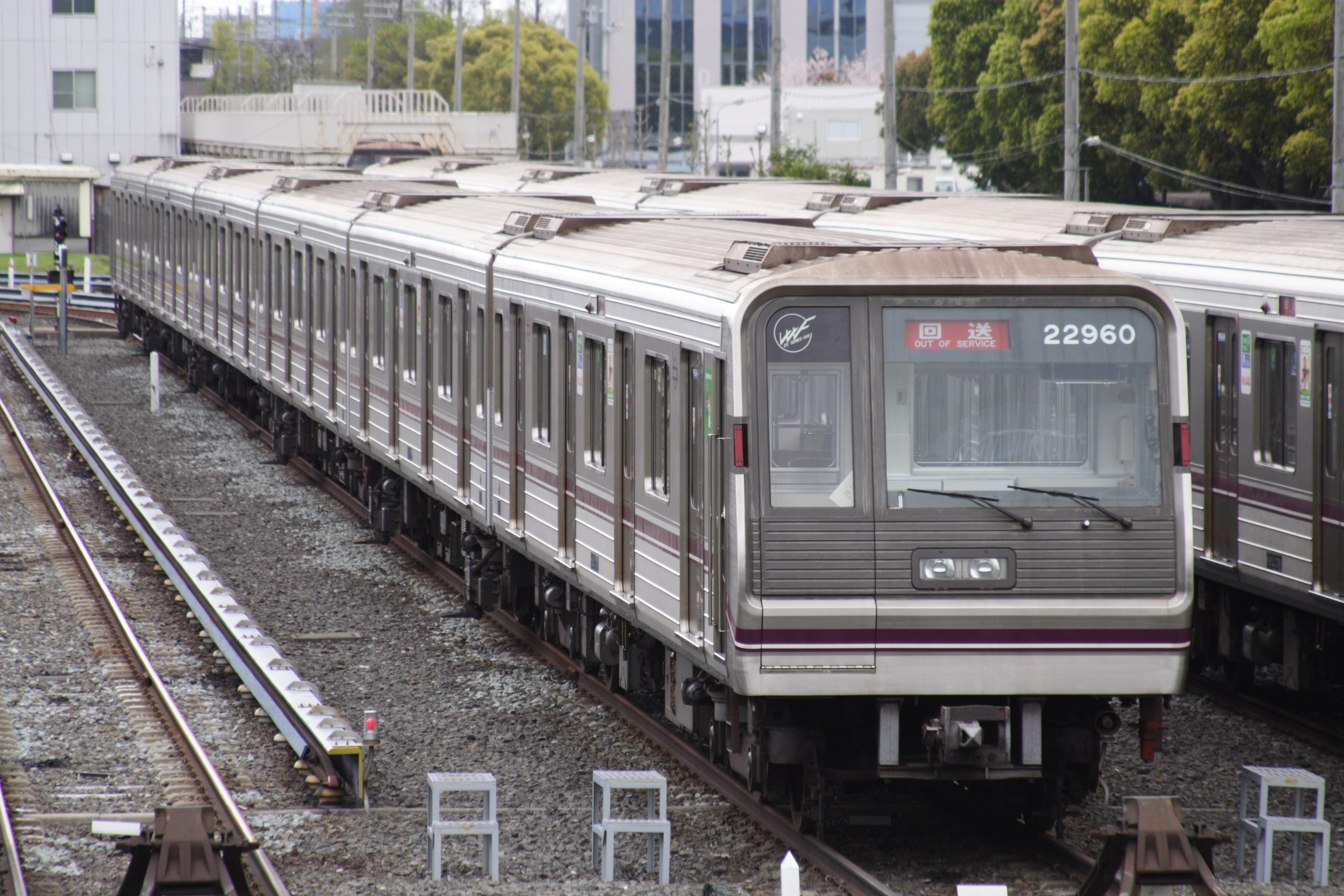
22 series trainset (Tanimachi Line 22–50 series)

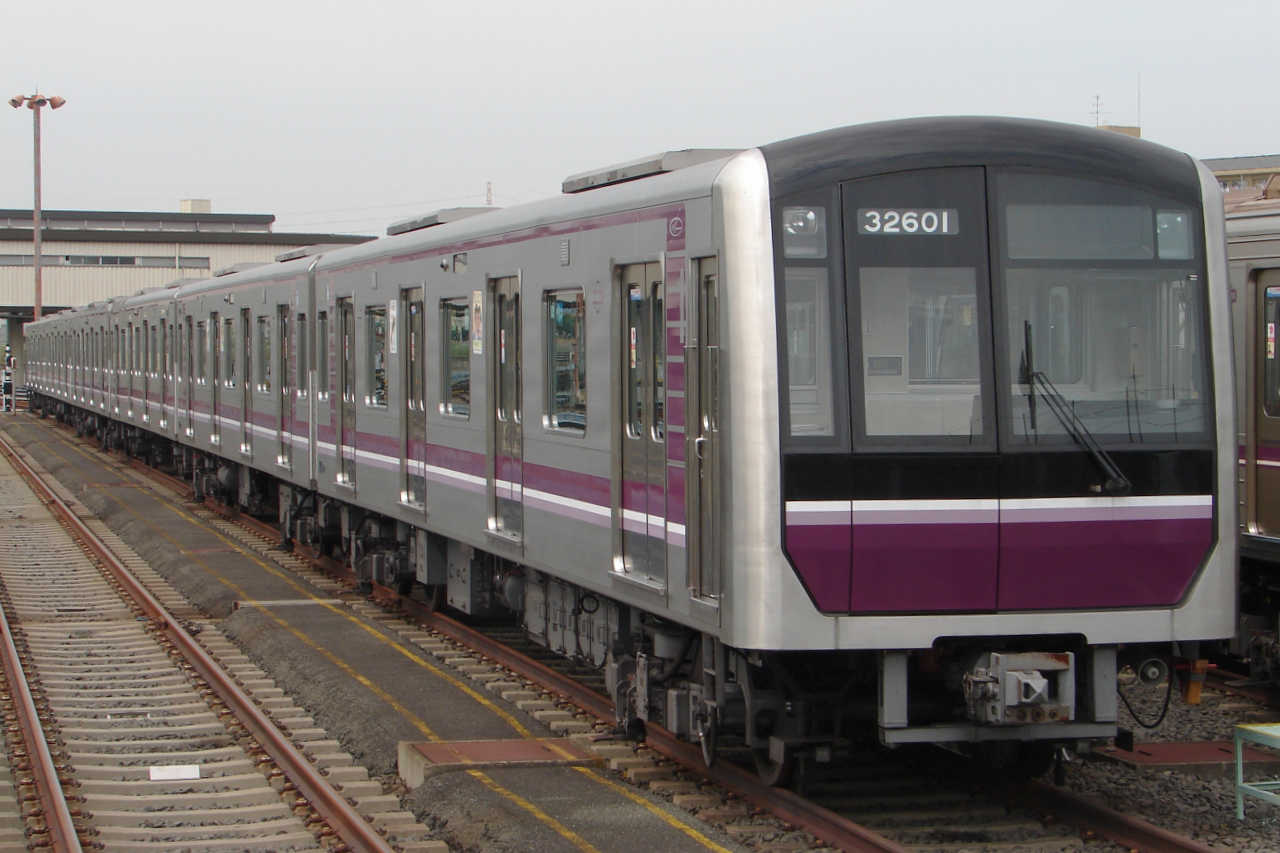
30000 series trainset

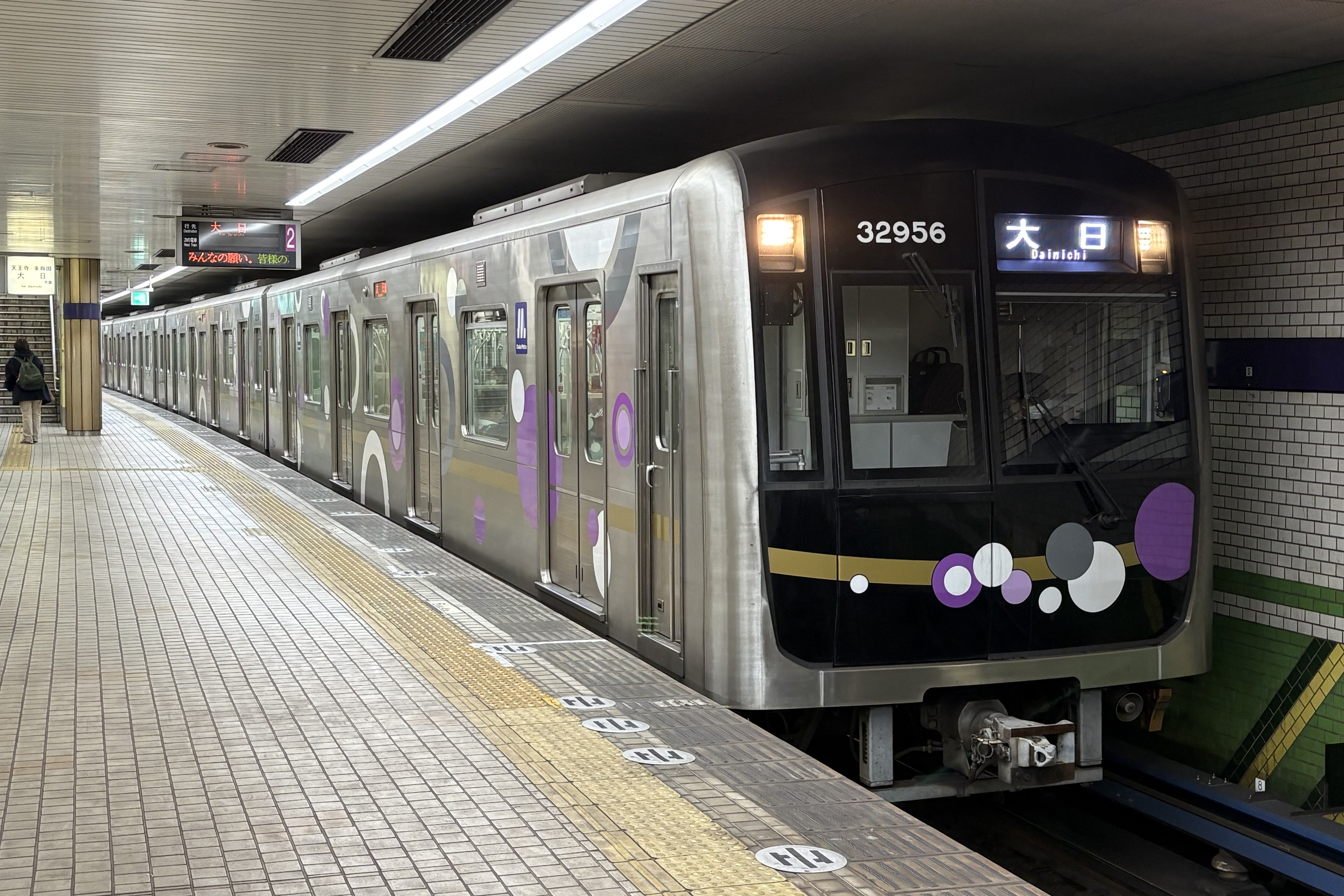
30000A series trainset

=== Former ===
- 50 series (1969–1991)
  - 5700 series (1980–1991)
  - 5800 series (1978–1991)
  - 5900 series (1978–1991)
- 10 series (1974–1976; subsequently transferred to the Midōsuji Line)
- 20 series (1989–2006; transferred to the Chūō Line)
- 30 series (1967–2013)
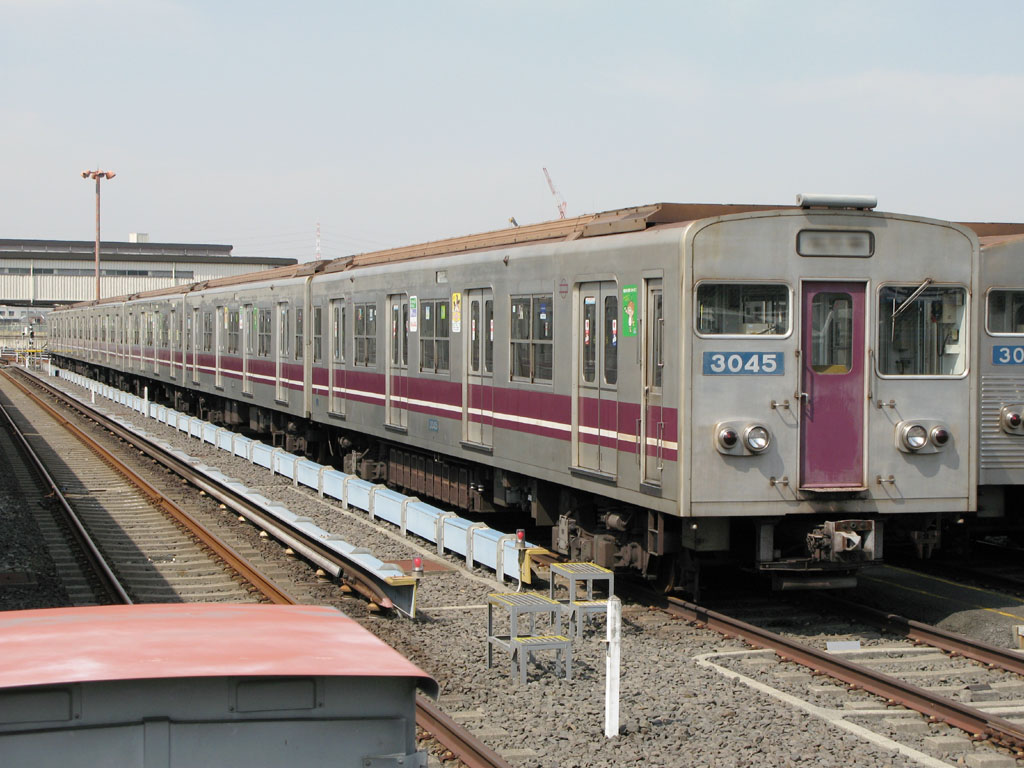
30 series trainset

== History ==
=== Construction ===
According to the original plan laid out for the Tanimachi Line in 1927, it was to follow Matsuyamachi-suji (to the west of Tanimachi-suji). It was also intended to interface directly with the Midōsuji Line directly at Umeda, similar to the cross-platform interchange between the Yotsubashi Line and the Midōsuji Line at Daikokuchō. A second tunnel was dug at Umeda for this purpose, but the connection southwards was plagued by collapses and other accidents; as a result, the planned route was changed to the current one, stopping at Higashi-Umeda and then veering eastward. The tunnel at Umeda reserved for the Tanimachi Line ("Matsuyamachi Line") went unused for decades before finally being adapted for the southbound track of the Midōsuji Line in 1989, allowing for expanded platforms to cope with overcrowding. Over the course of tunnel construction for the line, the underground waterways in Osaka were greatly altered, causing a number of incidents in which famous wells dried up.

On April 8, 1970, a gas explosion during the construction of the underground Tenjimbashi Rokuchōme Station resulted in a massive explosion and fire that killed 79 people, injured 420 others, and damaged 495 buildings.

=== Successor to the Nankai Hirano Line ===
Compared to the majority of areas served by the subway, where it runs underneath major roadways with high levels of traffic, part of the Tanimachi Line runs underneath relatively narrow streets with fewer cars, near residential areas. This is because the Abeno–Hirano section of the line was constructed as the successor in passenger transport to the same section of the Nankai Hirano Line, a tramway which ran aboveground between Imaike and Hirano, following the route of the Tanimachi Line from Abeno eastward. While it belongs to a different operator, this section of the Tanimachi Line is essentially the old streetcar line converted to an underground rapid-transit service.

The names of stations within this section reflect the station names of the Hirano Line:

| Station | Replaced by | Note |
|---|---|---|
| Imaike | | Station still exists on the Hankai Tramway Hankai Line; Hirano Line branched off just south of the station |
| Tobita | | Located at the southwest edge of Tobita Shinchi, next to the wall of the former pleasure district |
| Abeno (Saijō-mae) | Abeno | Located perpendicular to Uemachi Line Abeno Station; a spur east of the station allowed through service between Tennōji-ekimae and Hirano |
| Nawashiroda | | |
| Fuminosato | Fuminosato | Subway station shifted northwest towards Nawashiroda; Hirano Line station was located at the entrance to Fuminosato shopping arcade |
| Momogaike | | Located next to Momogaike park, where the JR Hanwa Line crosses over the Tanimachi Line |
| Tanabe | Tanabe | Subway station shifted 200 m (656 ft) northwest towards Momogaike |
| Komagawa-chō | Komagawa-Nakano | Located near Komagawa-ekimae Shopping Street |
| Nakano | Komagawa-Nakano | Located roughly where Imazato-suji crosses the Tanimachi Line |
| Nishi-Hirano | Hirano | Located north of Hirano Ward office; former station site landscaped and maintained as "Setoguchi Park" |
| Hirano | Hirano | Located east of Osaka Inner Loop Road, near the southwest edge of historical Hirano Village; small park and monument in former location |

=== Timeline ===
- 24 March 1967: Opening of the Higashi-Umeda – Tanimachi Yonchōme section as Osaka Subway Line 2. Trains started running in 2-car formation.
- October, 1967: Automatic train operation (ATO) trialled on Line 2, trials ended in February 1968.
- 17 December 1968: Opening of the Tanimachi Yōnchōme – Tennōji section. Trains started running in 4-car formation.
- 6 December 1969: Officially adopted the name Tanimachi Line.
- 8 April 1970: The "Ten-Roku Gas Explosion Accident" occurs during the construction of the underground Tenjimbashi Rokuchōme Station at 17:45 JST, leading to 79 deaths and 420 injuries.
- 29 May 1974: Opening of the Higashi-Umeda – Miyakojima section. 10 series EMUs began operation (later transferred to Midōsuji Line in February 1976).
- 25–31 October 1976: Trains started running in 6-car formation.
- 6 April 1977: Opening of the Miyakojima – Moriguchi section.
- 27 November 1980: Opening of the Tennōji – Yaominami section.
- 8 February 1983: Opening of the Moriguchi – Dainichi section.
- May 1989: 20 series EMUs began operation (transferred to the Chūō Line in 2006)
- April 1990: 22 series EMUs began operation, replacing the 50 series.
- 18 March 2009: 30000 series EMUs began operation.
