= Higashi-Umeda Station =

Metro station in Osaka, Japan

Higashi-Umeda Station 東梅田駅
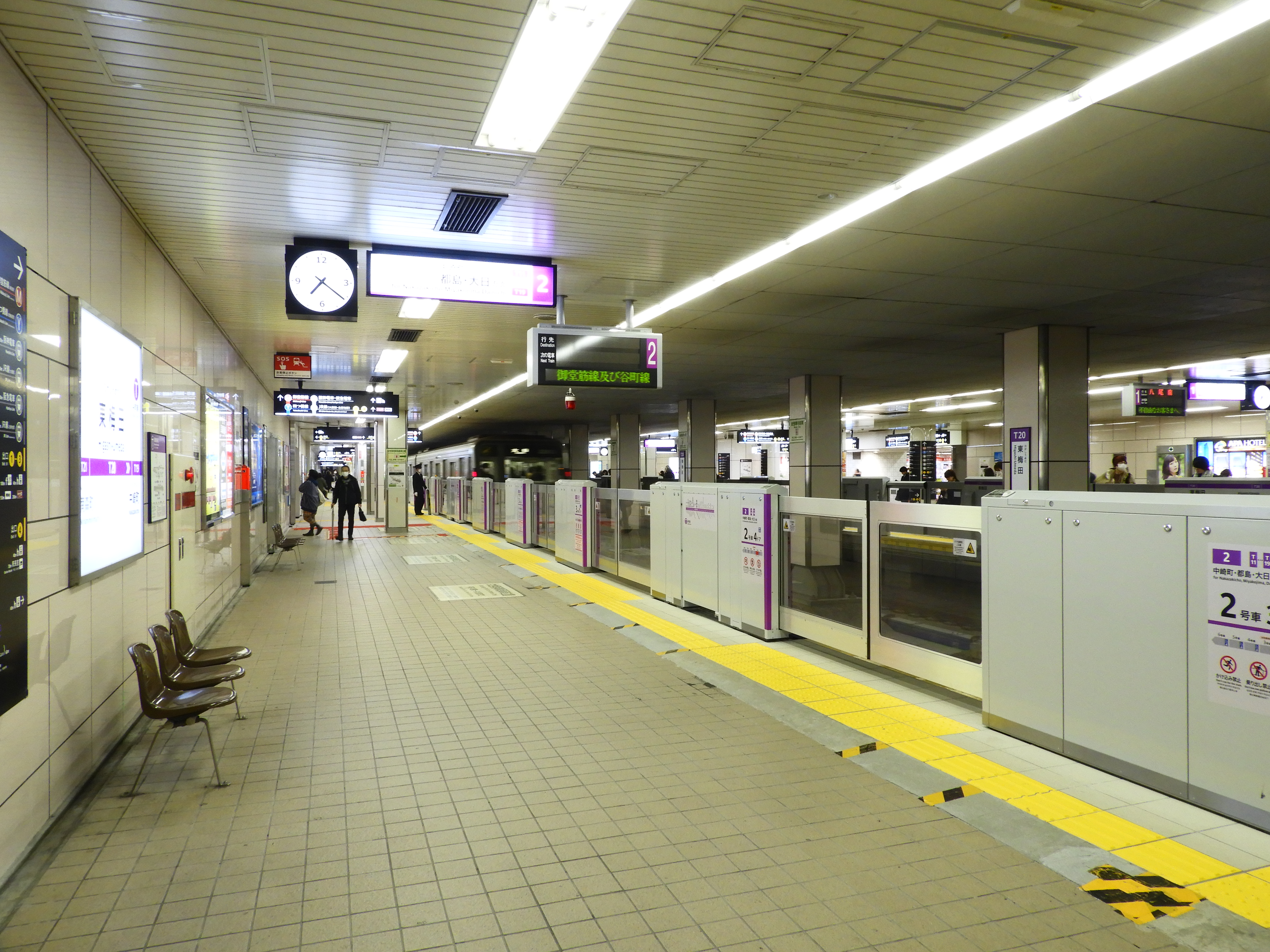

General information
- Location: Sonezaki Nichōme, Kita, Osaka, Osaka （大阪市北区曽根崎二丁目） Japan
- Coordinates: 34°42′3.52″N 135°29′58.4″E
- System: Osaka Metro
- Operator: Osaka Metro
- Line: Tanimachi Line
- Platforms: 2 side platforms
- Tracks: 2
- Connections: Bus terminal; Umeda, Nishi-Umeda, Osaka and Kitashinchi stations

Construction
- Structure type: Underground

Other information
- Station code: T 20

History
- Opened: 1967

Passengers
- FY2016: 166,676 daily

Services
Preceding station	Osaka Metro	Following station
Nakazakichō T 19 towards Dainichi	Tanimachi Line	Minami-morimachi T 21 towards Yaominami
Location
- Location within Osaka Prefecture Location within Japan

Higashi-Umeda Station (東梅田駅, Higashi-Umeda-eki; T20) is a railway station on the Osaka Metro Tanimachi Line in Umeda, Kita-ku, Osaka, Japan. The station is located along Whity Umeda.

== Connecting lines from Higashi-Umeda ==
- Osaka Metro
  - Midōsuji Line (Umeda Station, M 16 )
  - Yotsubashi Line (Nishi-Umeda Station, Y 11 )
- JR West (Ōsaka Station, Kitashinchi Station)
- Hankyu Railway (Umeda Station)
  - Kōbe Line
  - Takarazuka Line
  - Kyōto Line
- Hanshin Electric Railway Main Line (Umeda Station)

Information
1. When using regular tickets of Osaka Metro, Surutto Kansai cards, and IC cards (PiTaPa, ICOCA), it is limited to 30 minutes to change to the Midosuji Line and the Yotsubashi Line.
2. It takes approximately 12 minutes to change to the JR Tozai Line, thus, it is more useful to change to the line at Minami-Morimachi Station.

== Layout ==
There are two side platforms with two tracks on the second basement. There are two tickets gates in the north for exit from each platform, in the center for entrance to and exit from each platform, and one in the south for entrance to and exit from both platforms.

1	■ Tanimachi Line	for Minami-morimachi, Temmabashi, Tanimachi, Tennoji and Yaominami
2	■ Tanimachi Line	for Miyakojima and Dainichi

== Around the station ==
- Hanshin Department Store
- Hankyu Department Store (Umeda Hankyu Building)
- South Gate Building
  - Daimaru Umeda
  - Hotel Granvia Osaka
  - Pokémon Center Osaka
- Osaka City Bus Terminal
- Kintetsu Bus stop (transit buses for Inada Depot via Kyobashi, and express buses)
- Sonezaki Police Station
- Asahiya Shoten
- Shin-Hankyu Building
  - Shin-Hankyu Hachibangai
- Ohatsu Tenjin
- Hankyu Higashi-dori
- Whity Umeda
- Osaka Ekimae Buildings
- Daiyu-ji
