= Osaka Municipal Transportation Bureau =

Former Transportation Bureau in Osaka, Japan

- 大阪市交通局; Ōsaka-shi Kōtsū-kyoku
- "Mio-den". All Osaka Metro train cars retain this logo.

Former government agency of Osaka overview
- Formed: 12 September 1903; 122 years ago
- Dissolved: 31 March 2018; 8 years ago
- Superseding Former government agency of Osaka: Osaka Metro Group
- Jurisdiction: Osaka
- Headquarters: Nishi-ku, Osaka
- Website: kotsu.city.osaka.lg.jp

Osaka Municipal Transportation Bureau (大阪市交通局, Ōsaka-shi Kōtsū-kyoku) was the public department of transportation of the city of Osaka, Japan that existed from 1903 to 2018. It operated the municipal subway lines, the New Tram, and the city buses that have replaced the remaining lines of the municipal tram network.

On April 1, 2018, the bureau was split into two private companies: Osaka Rapid Electric Tramway K.K. (known as Osaka Metro) and Osaka City Bus.

== Services provided ==
- Municipal trams: 1903–1969
- City trolleybuses: 1953–1970
- Municipal subway: 1933–2018 (8 lines; Surutto KANSAI Cards and IC cards (PiTaPa and ICOCA) accepted)
  - New Tram: 1981–2018
- City buses: 1927–2018 (103 regular bus routes, 29 red bus routes)

== Tickets ==
- One-Day Pass "Enjoy Eco Card" (エンジョイエコカード) (800 yen (600 yen on weekends, Japan's national holidays, obon, year-end and new year holidays) for adults, 300 yen for children) - Available on the printed date on subways, the New Tram and city buses.
- Multiple Ride Card (3,000 yen for adults, 1,500 yen for children) - Usage amounts are 3300 yen, the increase of 10%, and 1650 yen, respectively. When the balance changes to less than 200 yen, it can use up by putting this card and cash into a ticket vending machine, and purchasing a one-way ticket.
- Rainbow Card (500 yen, 1,000 yen, 2,000 yen, and 3,000 yen for adults, 500 yen and 1,000 yen for children) - Available on the rail lines and buses belonging to Surutto KANSAI. When the balance changes to less than 200 yen, it can use up by putting this card and cash into a ticket vending machine, and purchasing a one-way ticket.
