= Yaominami Station =

Metro station in Yao, Osaka Prefecture, Japan

Coordinates: 34.5972°N 135.5825°E

Yaominami Station 八尾南駅
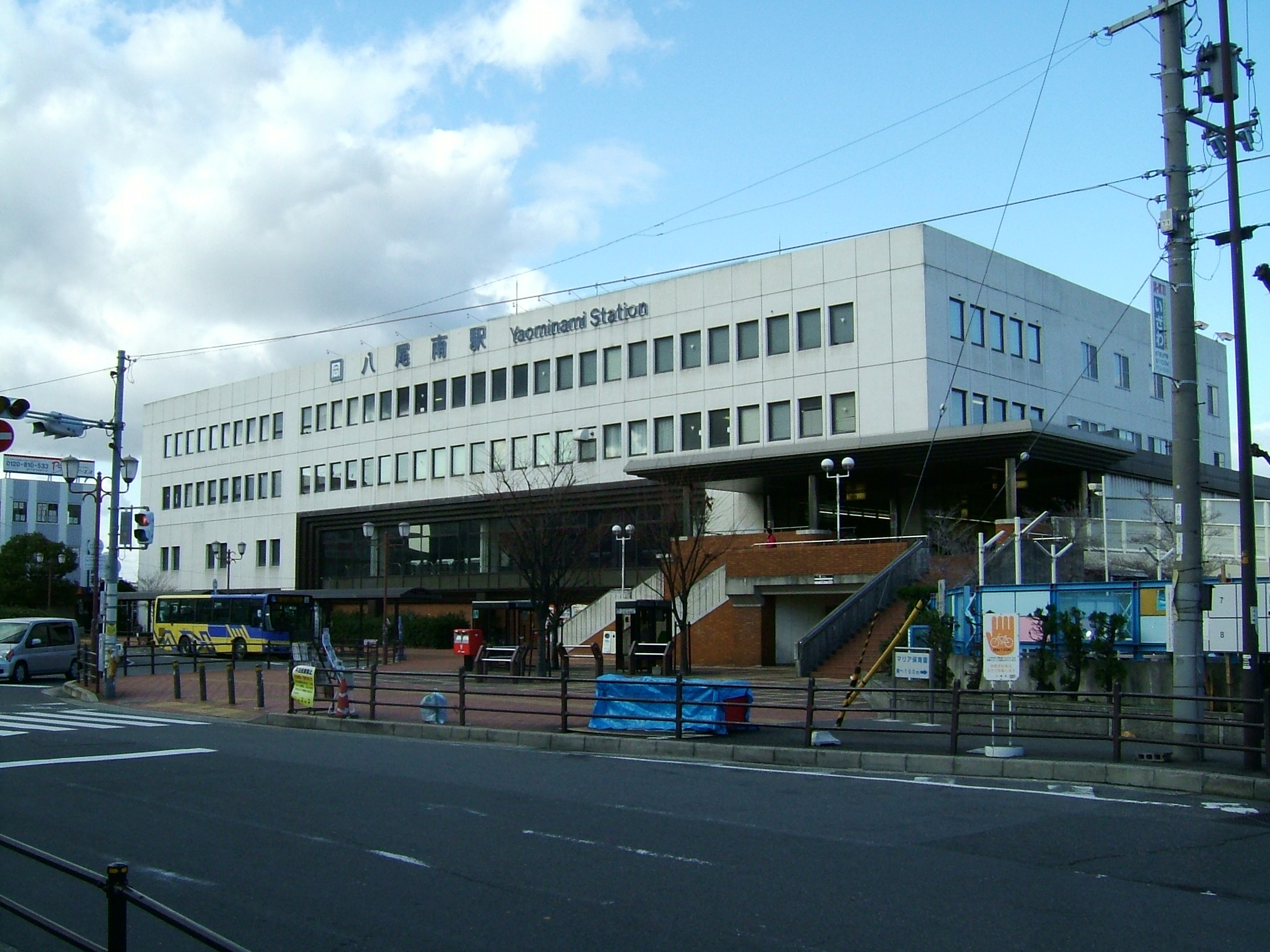
- Station building

General information
- Location: 1 Wakabayashichō, Yao, Osaka （大阪府八尾市若林町1丁目） Japan
- System: Osaka Metro
- Operator: Osaka Metro
- Line: Tanimachi Line
- Platforms: 1 island platform
- Tracks: 2
- Connections: Yao Airport (ICAO: RJOY)

Construction
- Structure type: At grade

Other information
- Station code: T 36

History
- Opened: 27 November 1980; 45 years ago

Services
Preceding station	Osaka Metro	Following station
Nagahara T 35 towards Dainichi	Tanimachi Line	Terminus
Location

Yaominami Station (八尾南駅, Yao-minami-eki) is one of the termini of the Osaka Metro Tanimachi Line located in Yao, Osaka, Japan. It is numbered "T36".

== Station layout ==
There is an island platform with two tracks on the ground level.

2, 3	■ Tanimachi Line	for Tennoji, Higashi-Umeda and Dainichi

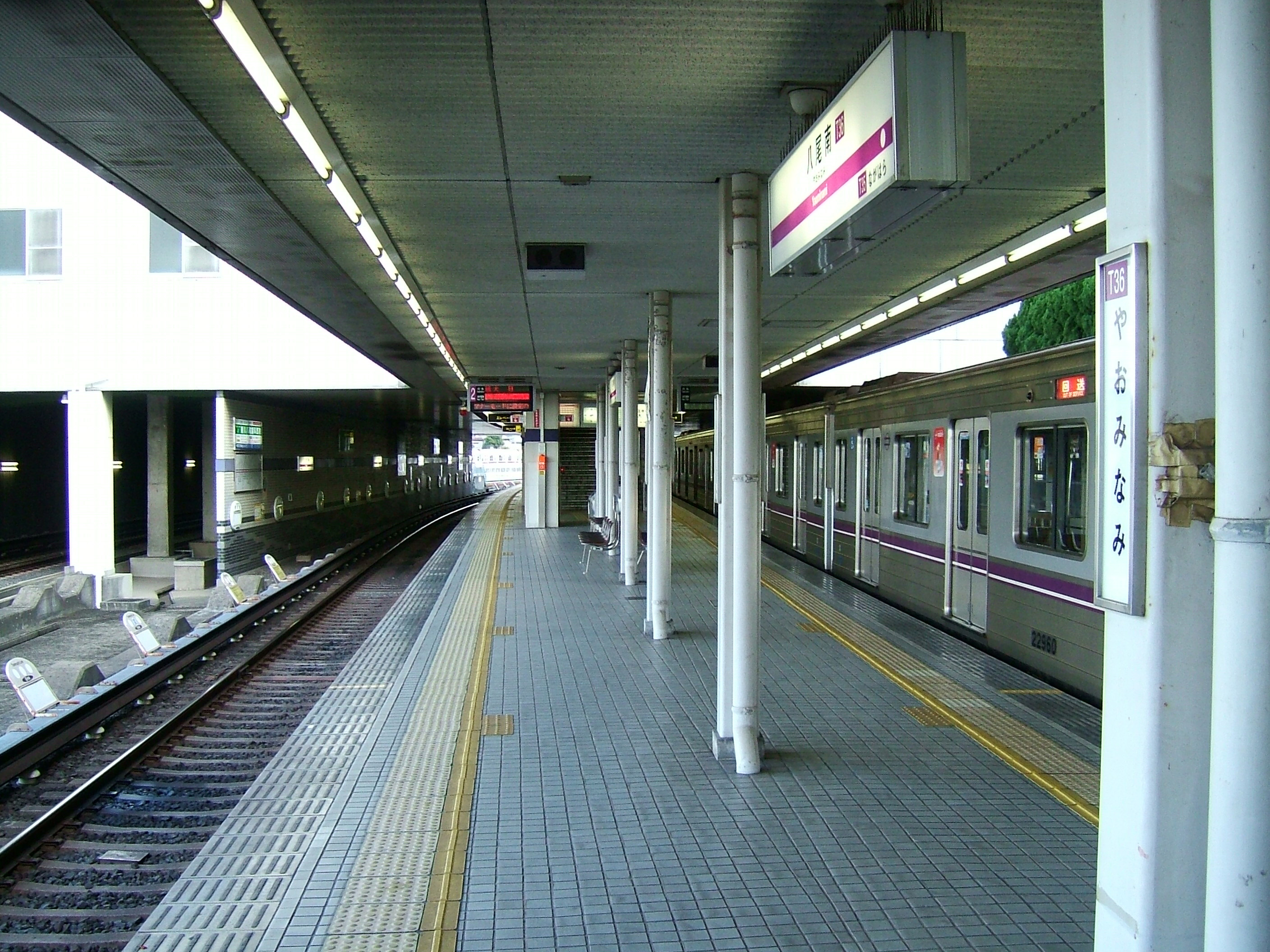
Platform

== Surrounding area ==
- Osaka City Bus Yao Depot
- Yao Airport

=== Buses ===
Kintetsu Bus Co., Ltd.
Yaominami-ekimae
- Bus stop 1
  - Route 70 for Kintetsu Yao-ekimae via JR Yao-ekimae and Yao City Hall
  - Route 71 for Minami-Taishido
- Bus stop 2
  - Route 08 for JR Kyuhoji-ekimae via Rokutan-higashi Jutaku-mae and Yao Municipal Hospital
  - Route 74 for Numa Yonchome and Ota
  - Route 75 for Ota Nanachome-nishi, Ishinkai Yao Hospital and Ota
- Bus stop 3
  - Routes 70 and 71 for Fujiidera-ekimae via Ota and Fujiidera City Hall
