= Dainichi Station =

Metro and monorail station in Moriguchi, Osaka Prefecture, Japan

Dainichi Station 大日駅
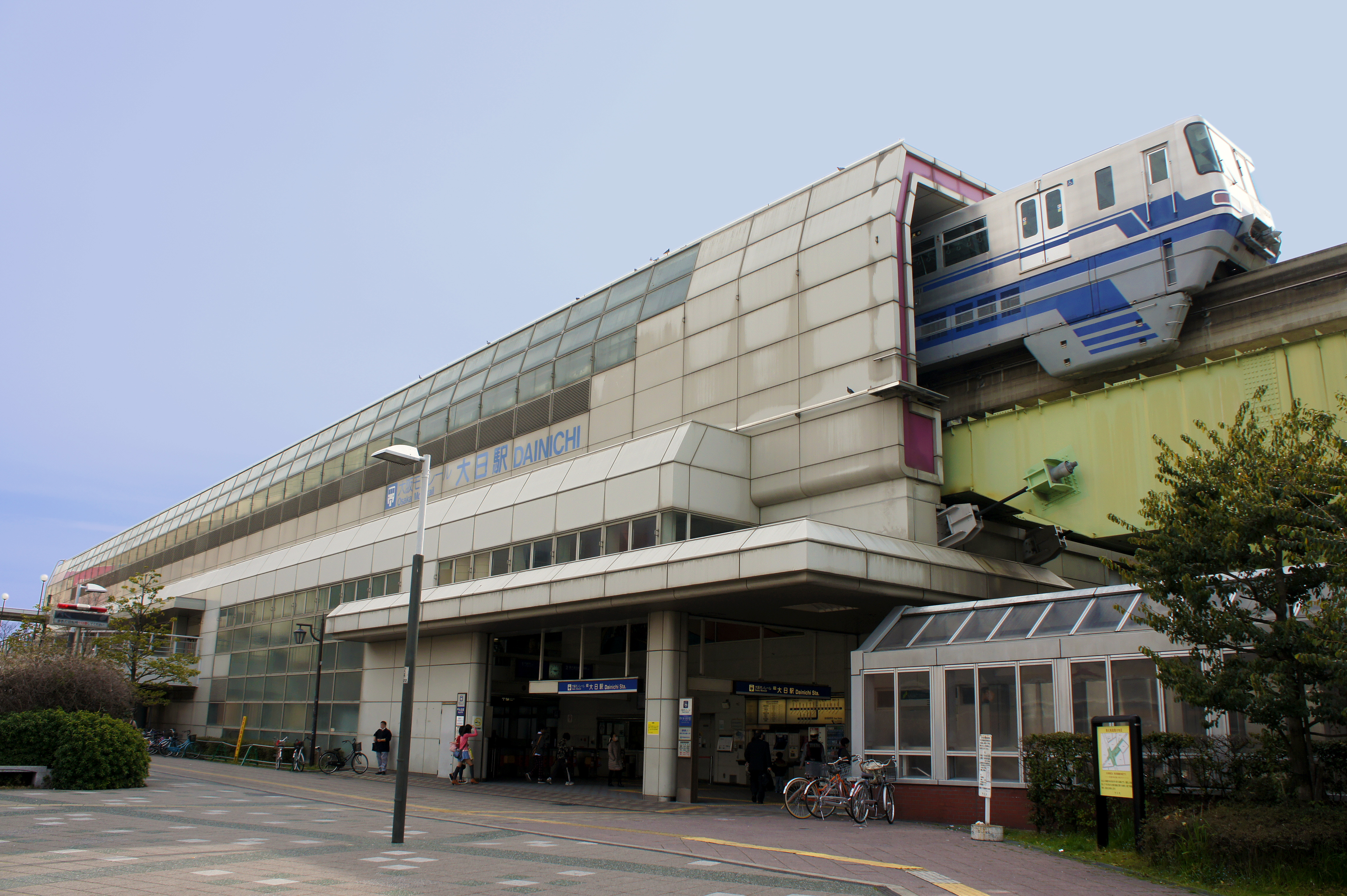
- Dainichi Station entrance (2012)

General information
- Location: Dainichicho, Moriguchi-shi, Osaka-fu; Japan
- Coordinates: 34°44′57.86″N 135°34′41.79″E
- Operator: Osaka Metro; Osaka Monorail
- Lines: Tanimachi Line; ■ Osaka Monorail Main Line
- Platforms: 2 island platforms (1 for each line)
- Tracks: 4 (2 for each line)

Construction
- Structure type: Elevated (Monorail); Underground (Tanimachi Line)

Other information
- Station code: T 11; 23 (Osaka Monorail)

History
- Opened: February 8, 1983; 43 years ago

Passengers
- FY2019: 33,719 daily (Osaka Metro); 5,242 (Osaka Monorail)

Services
Preceding station	Osaka Metro	Following station
Terminus	Tanimachi Line	Moriguchi T 12 towards Yaominami
Location
- Location within Osaka Prefecture Location within Japan

Dainichi Station (大日駅, Dainichi-eki) is a metro station located in the city of Moriguchi, Osaka, Japan. It consists of the underground station operated by Osaka Metro and the elevated above-ground station operated by the Osaka Monorail,

== Lines ==
Dainichi Station is a terminus of the underground Tanimachi Line, and is located 28.1 km from the opposing terminus of the line at Yaominami Station. The elevated Osaka Monorail Main Line is 19.9 kilometers from Osaka Airport Station.

== Station layout ==
The station has one underground island platform serving two tracks and fenced with platform gates. The monorail station also has an island platform with platform gates.

=== Platforms ===
3F

1	■ Main Line	to Kadomashi
2	■ Main Line	for Bampaku-Kinen-Koen (Expo '70 Commemoration Park), Hotarugaike, Osaka Airport and Saito-nishi

B3F

1, 2	■ Tanimachi Line	for Miyakojima, Higashi-Umeda, Tennoji and Yaominami

=== Station building layout ===
3F; Monorail platforms	Platform 1	→ Main Line toward Kadomashi (Terminus) →
3F; Monorail platforms	Island platform, doors will open on the right
3F; Monorail platforms	Platform 2	← Main Line toward Osaka Airport (Minami Settsu)
2F	Monorail mezzanine	One-way faregates, ticket machines, station agent
1F	Street Level	Exit/Entrance, bus terminal
B1F	Upper mezzanine	To exits/entrances
B2F	Osaka Metro mezzanine	One-way faregates, ticket machines, station agent
B3F; Metro platforms	Platform 2	← Tanimachi Line toward Yaominami (Moriguchi)
B3F; Metro platforms	Island platform, doors will open on the left/right
B3F; Metro platforms	Platform 1	← Tanimachi Line toward Yaominami (Moriguchi)

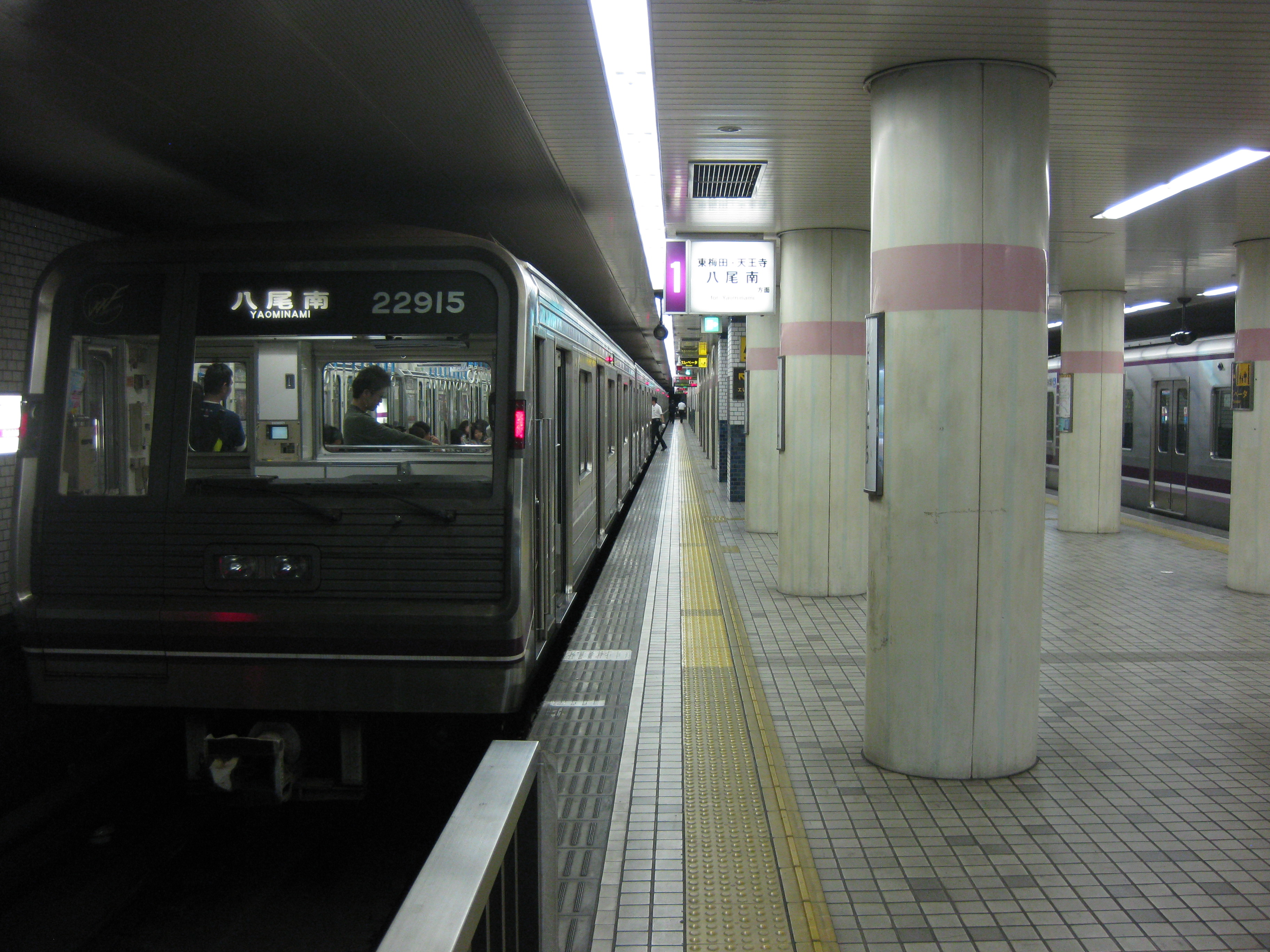
Tanimachi Line platforms

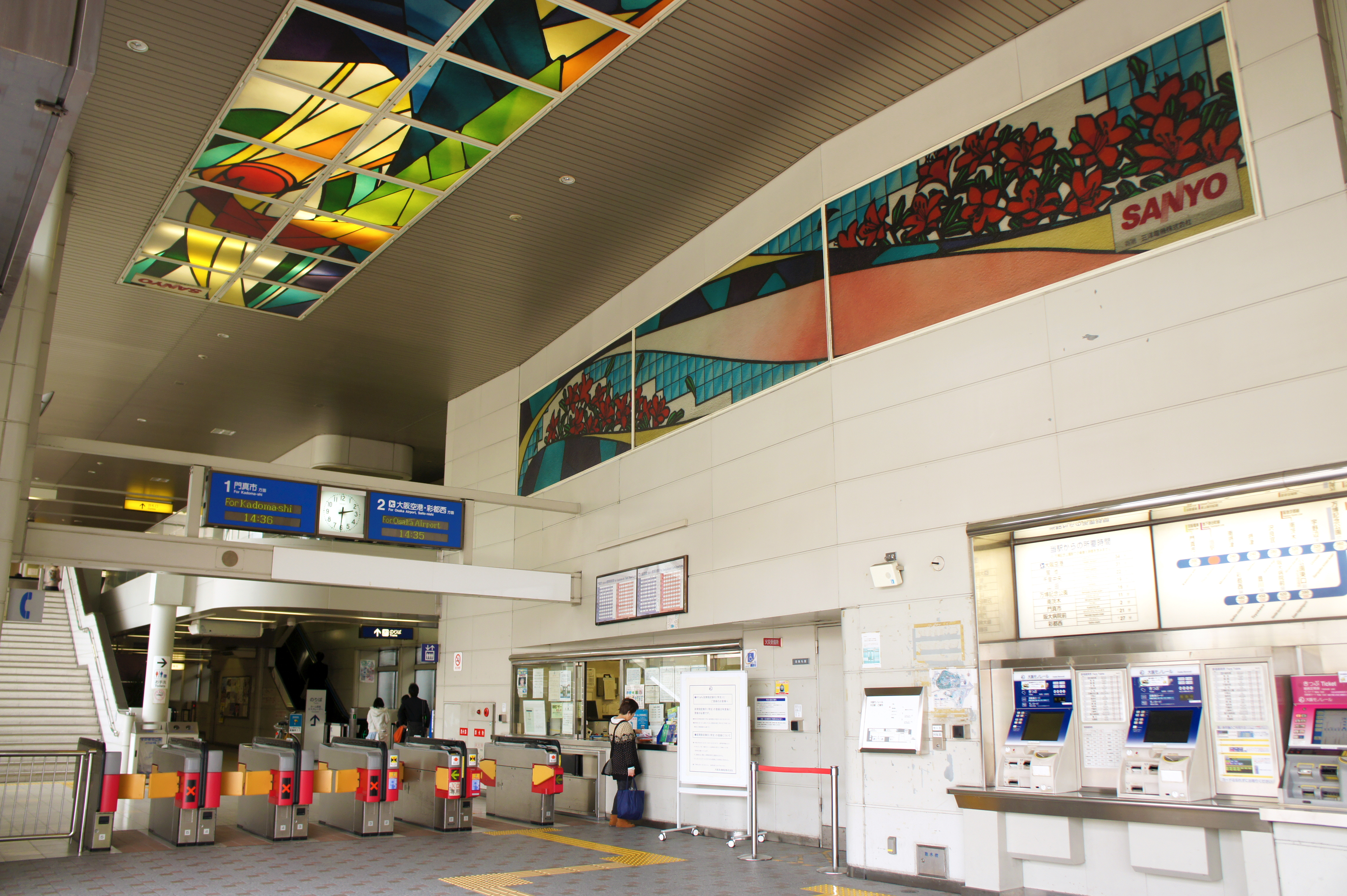
Osaka Monorail ticket gates

== Adjacent stations ==
«	Service	»
Osaka Monorail Main Line (23)
Minami Settsu (22)	-	Kadoma-shi (24)

== History ==
- 8 February 1983: the Tanimachi Line subway station opened.
- 22 August 1997: Osaka Monorail Main Line opened.
- 12 April 2004: Dainichi station reopens on the former site of the Sanyo Factory
- 21 September 21, 2006: New 2nd floor ticket window is added

== Passenger statistics ==
In fiscal 2019, the Osaka Metro station was used by an average of 33,719 passengers daily and the Osaka Monorail station by 5,242 passengers daily.

== Surrounding area ==
- ÆON Mall Dainichi
  - ÆON Dainichi
  - ÆON Cinema Dainichi
- Panasonic Corporation
- Osaka Municipal Transportation Bureau Dainichi Inspection Depot
- Japan National Route 1 (Chuo Kanjosen)
- Kinki Expressway
- Osaka Prefectural Route 13: Kyoto Moriguchi Route

== See also ==
- List of railway stations in Japan
