= Aida (disambiguation) =

Aida is an opera by Giuseppe Verdi.

Aida or AIDA may also refer to:

== Arts and entertainment ==
=== Film and television ===
- Aida (1911 film), an American drama film
- Aida (1953 film), a film starring Sophia Loren
- Aida (1987 film), a Swedish film
- Aida (2015 film), a Moroccan film
- Aída, a Spanish TV series

=== Music ===
- Aida (musical), a musical by Elton John and Tim Rice
- Aida (album), a 1980 album by Derek Bailey
- Aida (Rino Gaetano album), a 1977 album by Rino Gaetano

=== Fictional entities ===
- AIDA (.hack), fictional AIs in the .hack franchise
- AIDA (comics), a fictional Life-Model Decoy from Marvel's Agents of S.H.I.E.L.D.
- Aida, a character from the Cairo Trilogy by Naquib Mahfouz
- Aida, a playable map in Mu Online
- Aïda, a character in the Neal Stephenson novel Seveneves
- Aida, a character in Unreal II: The Awakening

=== Other ===
- Fascinating Aïda, a British comedy singing group and satirical cabaret act
- After Aida, a 1985 play-with-music by Julian Mitchell

== Computing ==
- AIDA (computing) (Abstract Interfaces for Data Analysis), primarily used by researchers in high-energy particle physics
- AIDA (intermediate language), a predecessor of the intermediate language DIANA
- AIDA64 and AIDA32, software that provides information on hardware
- AIDA/Web, a Smalltalk open source web application framework
- AIDA interactive educational freeware diabetes simulator

== Places ==
- Aida, Okayama, a former town in Japan, known for the Aida race car circuit
  - TI Circuit Aida, a race car circuit which hosted the Formula One Pacific Grand Prix in 1994 and 1995, now called Okayama International Circuit
- Aida Junior High School, a junior high school in Mimasaka City, Okayama
- Aida District, Okayama, Japan
- Aida Camp, a Palestinian refugee camp

== Organisations ==
- Aida (café), a chain of coffeehouses in Vienna, Austria
- AIDA Cruises, a German cruise company, also the prefix of several ships in their fleet
- AIDA Hellas, a Greek non-profit organization for freediving
- AIDA International, an organizing body for freediving
- American Indian Defense Association, an American indigenous rights organization
- Asociacion Interamericana para la Defensa del Ambiente (Interamerican Association for Environmental Defense), an international environmental law organization
- Australasian Intervarsity Debating Association, an organizing body of the Australasian Intervarsity Debating Championships
- Australian Indigenous Doctors' Association, a member of the Lowitja Institute
- Azerbaijan International Development Agency, an organizing body for international aid by the Republic of Azerbaijan
- International Association of Arabic Dialectology (Association Internationale de Dialectologie Arabe)

== Other uses ==
- Aida (given name), a female given name (including a list of persons with the name)
- Aida (surname), a surname (including a list of persons with the name)
- Aida (horse), a racehorse
- AIDA (marketing) (Attention, Interest, Desire, Action)
- AIDA (international space cooperation) (Asteroid Impact and Deflection Assessment), a proposed pair of space probes
- Operation Aida, a WWII German operation
- Aida cloth, a cloth used in cross-stitch

== See also ==
- AIDAdiva, a 2007 German cruise ship
- Ask Aida, a cooking show on the Food Network
- "Celeste Aida", a romanza from the first act Aida by Giuseppe Verdi
- Ida (disambiguation)
- Men in Aida, a homophonic translation of Book One of Homer's Iliad
- Ptosanthus aida, a species of fruit fly in the family Tephritidae
- Quo Vadis, Aida?, a 2020 Bosnian war drama film
