= Takamitsu Azuma =

Japanese architect (1933–2015)

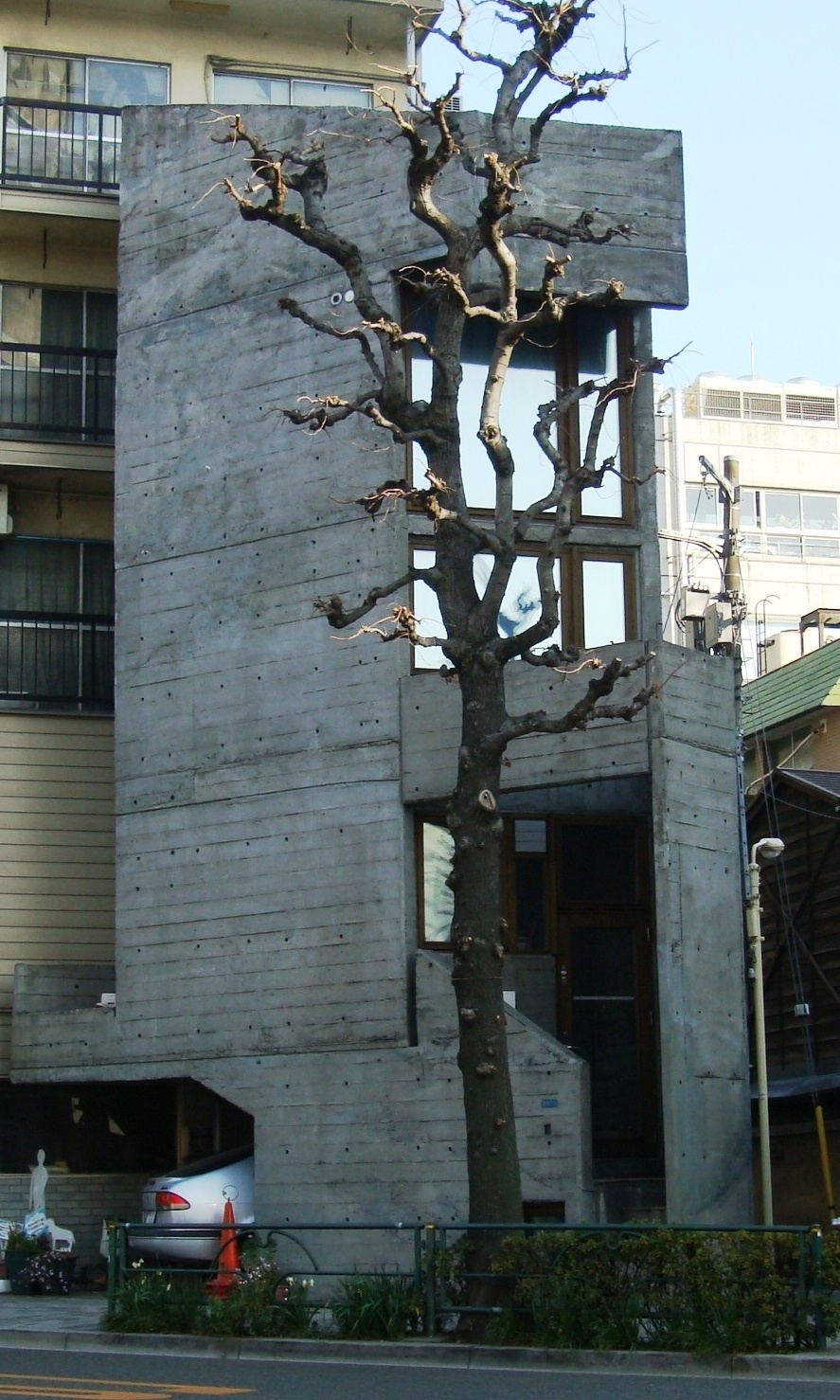
- The Tower House (1966)
- Born: September 20, 1933; Osaka, Osaka Prefecture, Japan
- Died: June 18, 2015 (aged 81)
- Education: Osaka University
- Occupation: Architect
- Awards: Prize of AIJ (Architectural Institute of Japan)
- Buildings: The Tower House

Takamitsu Azuma (東 孝光, Azuma Takamitsu; September 20, 1933 – June 18, 2015) was a Japanese architect, and winner of the 1995 the Prize of AIJ (Architectural Institute of Japan). He was a follower of Le Corbusier and was one of the most significant architects of the 20th century, combining traditional Japanese styles with modernism, and designed new types of houses symbolized living in the metropolis.

== Early life (1933–1957) ==
He was born in the center of the Osaka (the second largest metropolitan area in Japan), and raised with five sisters and younger brother. He grew up in the aftermath of the Pacific War (World War II). Just on the day of the end of the war (August 15, 1945), he returned to Osaka from the evacuation area, and the sight he saw was the starting point for his architect life. Air raid shelter and burn marks became his good playground, explore, dig and find something, just like as Boy's secret base.

He went to Shimizudani High School, and saw Gary Cooper starring "The Fountainhead". He was impressed by the belief and justice of the architects, and wanted to be an architect. Therefore, he tried and won the highly competitive entrance exam for one of the most prestigious Universities in Japan, and graduated from Osaka University (Faculty of Engineering Building Engineering) in 1957.

== Career ==
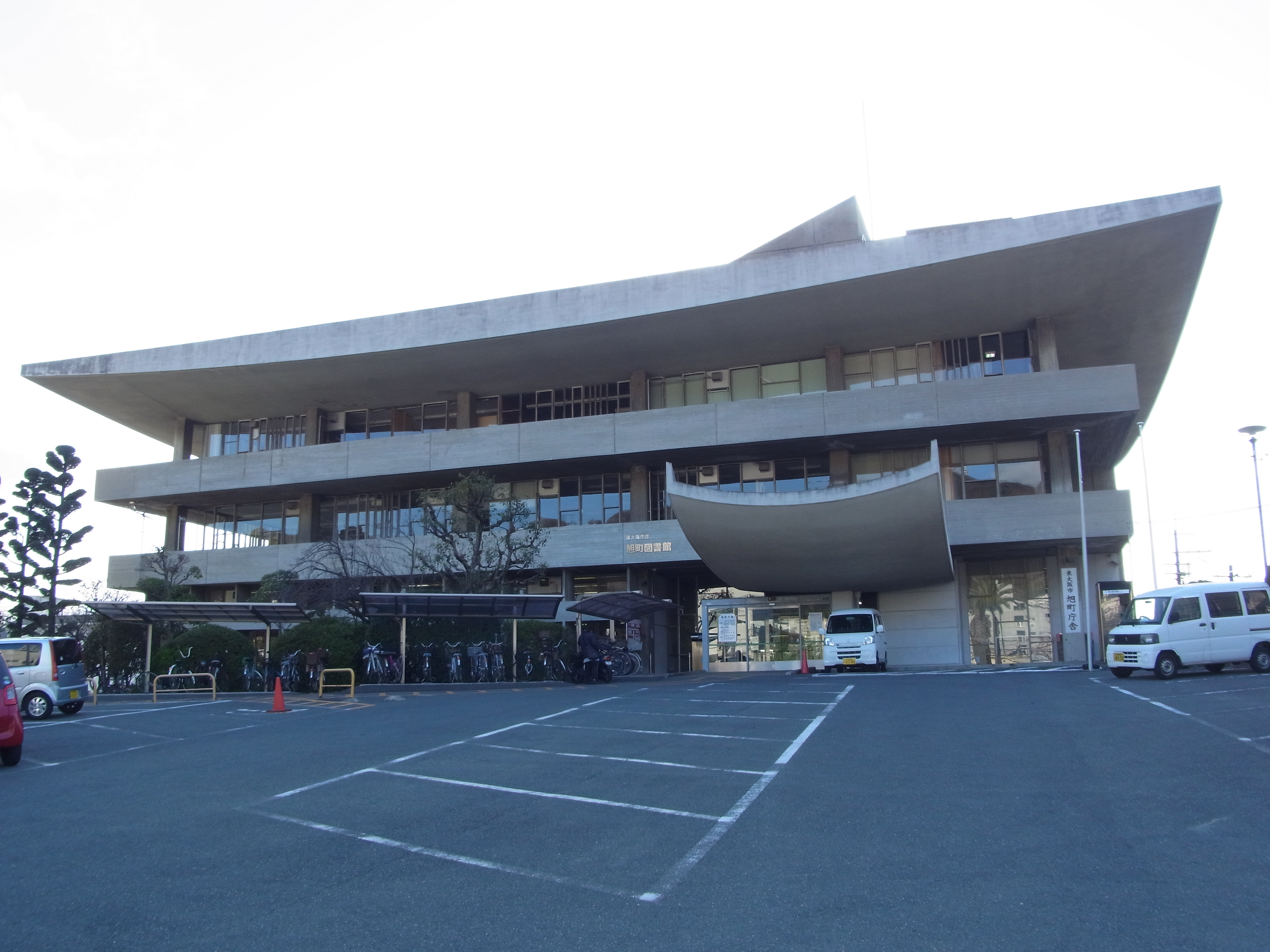
Higashiosaka City Hall (Branch office on Asahimachi), Osaka (1964)

After graduating, he worked as a Bureaucrat (Technocracy) in Ministry of Posts and Telecommunications (Japan), and working for seven years for Junzo Sakakura (a disciple of Le Corbusier) at Osaka office.

In 1964, he designed the City hall of Hiraoka (Present name "Higashiōsaka") as "Warped roof, large eaves, spiral staircase, and sash with well-designed windows". When the city decided to rebuild this hall, citizens have campaigned to protect this excellent designed building.

Besides, he designed the famous pedestrian space "Shinjuku Station West Gate Underground Park" and also supervised the design in 1966. This park is a passage leading to the Tokyo Metropolitan Government, and with an underground culture history, such as the center of anti-Vietnam War movement 'folk song guerrilla' activities in the 1960s.

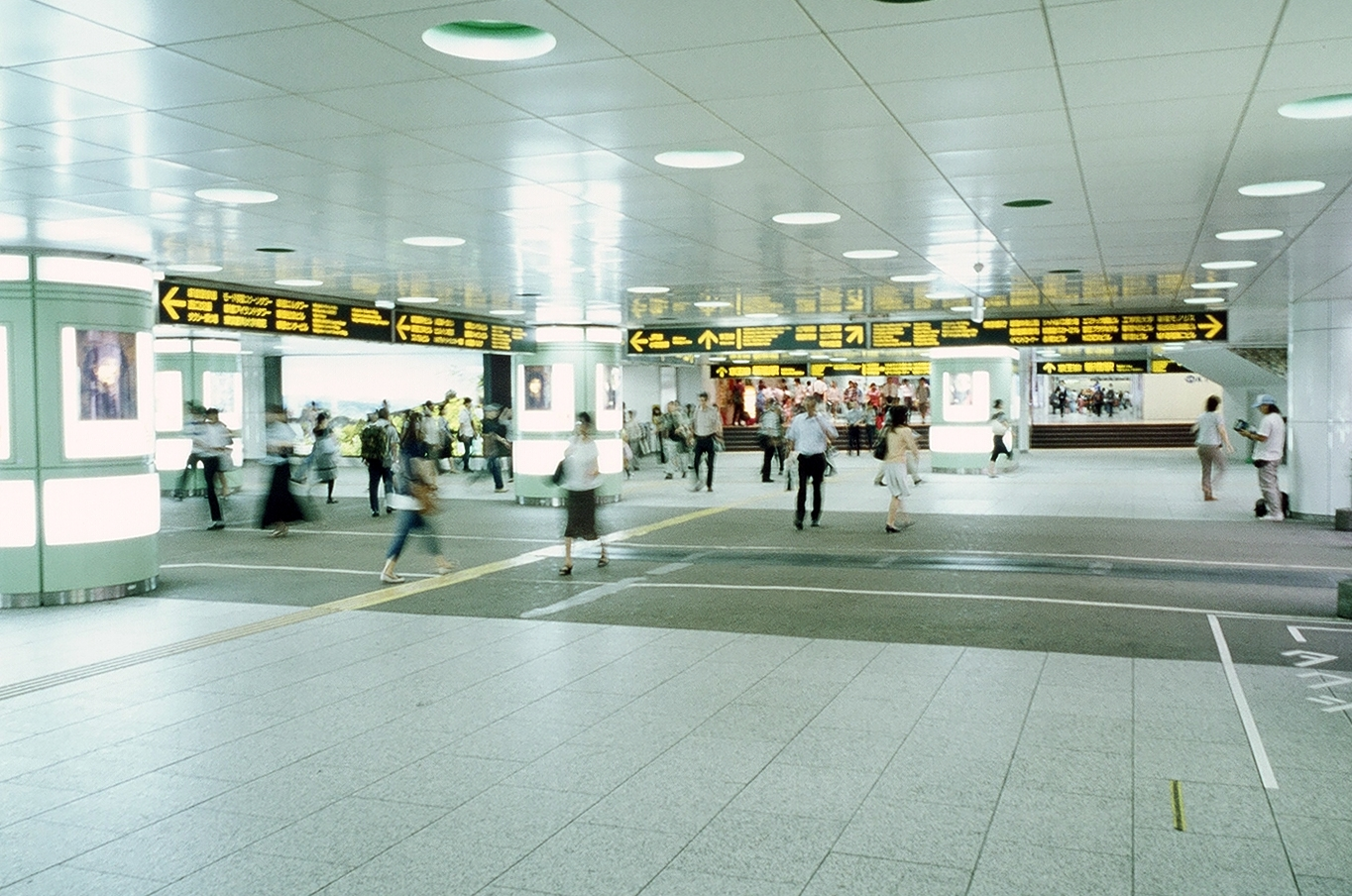
Shinjuku Station West Gate Underground Park, Tokyo (1966)

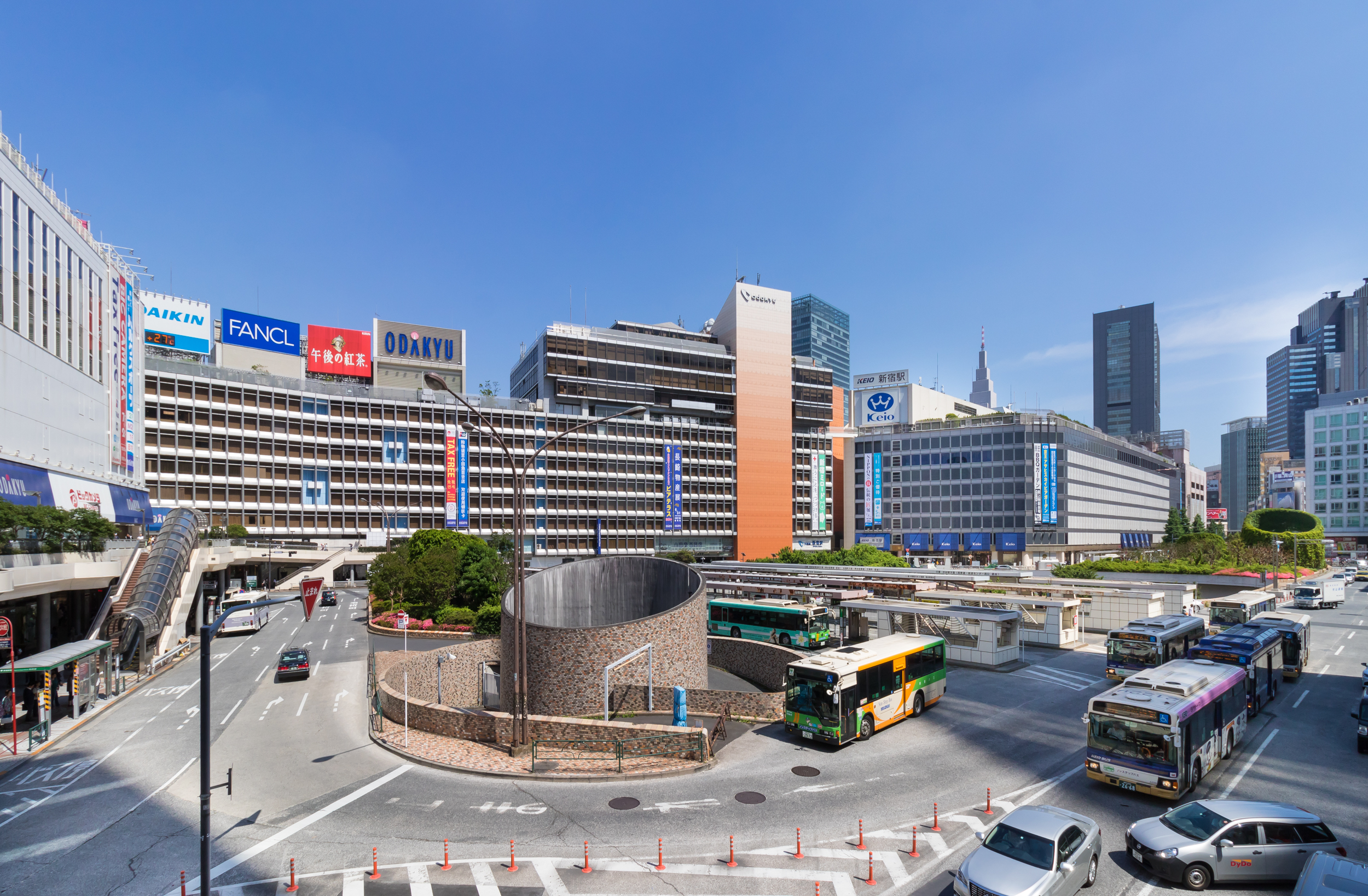
Ground part of the Shinjuku Station West Gate Underground Park

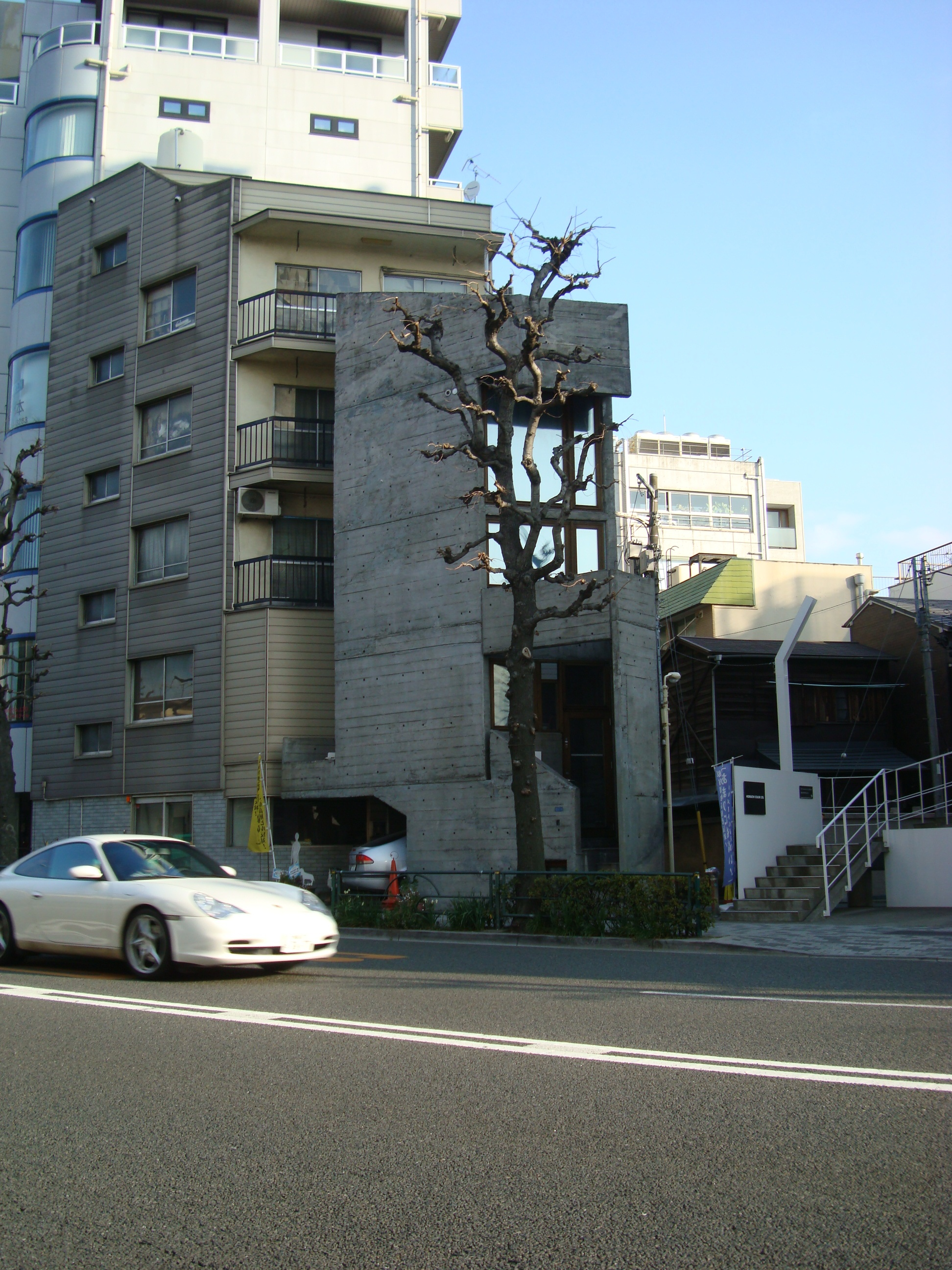
The Tower House (1966)

In 1966, he built his own house "Azuma House" (東邸), is a famous house called "The Tower House" which constructed with Béton brut ("raw concrete"), used a tiny plot of land of 20.5 square meters and has six stories and 65 square meters.

Japan is one of the most densely populated countries in the world. Therefore, this "Azuma house (Tower House)" was built in a prime location in Tokyo with high land prices, and was built using a narrow land in the shape of a triangle. It was regarded as a symbol of living in a modern metropolis center. Even after building this house, he designed more than 100 historic homes.

In 1967, he established his own firm. While he is designing the Mitsui Group Hall for the Expo '70 (world's fair) held in Japan.

In 1971, he formed the group ARCHITEXT with Takefumi Aida (ja:相田武文, Aida Takefumi), Mayumi Miyawaki (ja:宮脇檀, Miyawaki Mayumi), Makoto Suzuki (ja:鈴木恂, Suzuki Makoto) and Minoru Takeyama (ja:竹山実, Takeyama Minoru).

In 1985, he became a professor at his alma mater, Osaka University; in 1997 Professor of Chiba Institute of Technology.

== See also ==
- Junzo Sakakura
- Le Corbusier
- Tadao Ando – He designed "Row House in Sumiyoshi" in 1976 inspired by Takamitsu Azuma's "The Tower House"

== Sources ==
- 東 孝光 Takamitsu Azuma Interviews on Lixil Group(Japanese manufacturer of building materials and housing equipment Corporation). Retrieved 2020-04-17.
