= Aida (surname) =

Aida is a surname. As a Japanese surname, it is written 会田 or 相田. Notable people with the surname include:

- Aida Yūji (会田 雄次; 1916–1997), Japanese historian
- Garo Aida (会田 我路; born 1949), Japanese photographer
- Hideaki Aida (相田 秀晃; born 1943), Japanese rower
- Makoto Aida (会田 誠; born 1965), contemporary Japanese artist
- Setsuko Hara (原 節子) or Masae Aida (会田 昌江, 1920–2015), Japanese actress
- Miriam Aïda (born 1974), Swedish jazz singer
- Mitsuo Aida (相田 みつを; 1924-1991), Japanese poet and calligrapher
- Rikako Aida (逢田 梨香子; born 1992), Japanese voice actress
- Sayaka Aida (相田 さやか; born 1975), Japanese voice actor
- Shoko Aida (相田 翔子; born 1970), Japanese popular music artist and actress
- Takefumi Aida (相田武文; born 1937), Japanese architect
- Takuzo Aida (相田 卓三; born 1956), Japanese award-winning polymer chemist
- Tita Aida, American activist and advocate for HIV/AIDS awareness
- Yasuaki Aida (会田 安明; 1747–1817), Japanese mathematician
- Yu Aida (相田 裕; born 1977), Japanese manga author and illustrator
- Yua Aida (あいだ ゆあ; born 1984), Japanese model and AV idol
- Yuki Aida (相田 勇樹; born 1998), Japanese footballer
- Yushi Aida (会田 有志; born 1984), Japanese baseball player
