= Takaida Station =

Takaida Station is the name of two train stations in Osaka Prefecture, Japan:

- Takaida Station (Higashiōsaka)
- Takaida Station (Kashiwara)
