= Higashiosaka Junior College =

Coordinates: 34.67549°N 135.58155°E

- 東大阪大学短期大学部
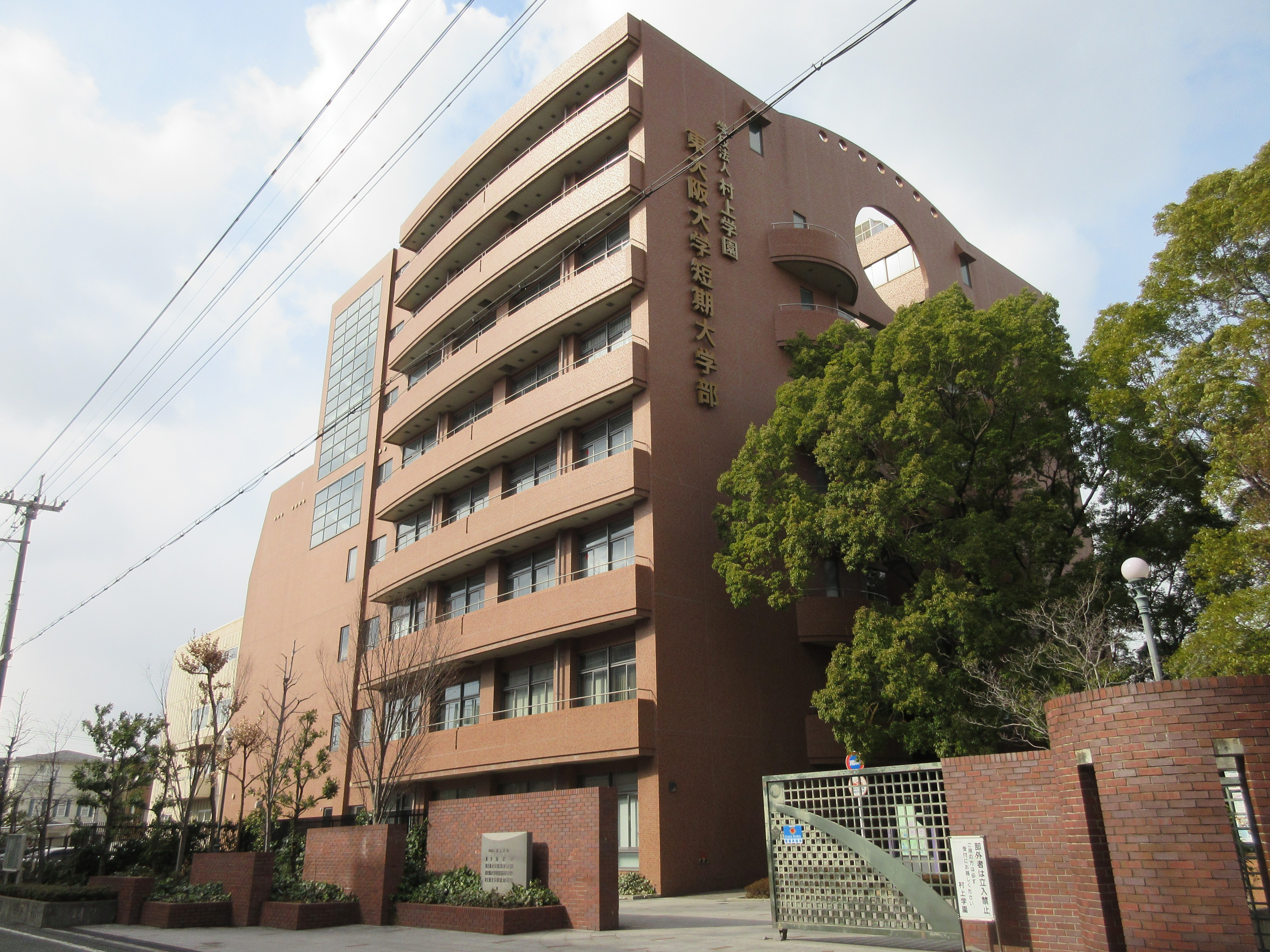
- Higashiosaka Junior College
- Established: 1965
- Location: Higashiōsaka, Osaka, Japan
- Website: www.higashiosaka.ac.jp/junior/index.html

Higashiosaka Junior College (東大阪大学短期大学部, Higashiōsaka Daigaku Tanki Daigakubu) is a private junior college in Higashiōsaka, Osaka, Japan.

== History ==
The junior college was founded in 1965 as a women's college. In 1966, the Child care department was set up. In 2001, the junior college became coeducational. In 2011, the Certified Care Work course was discontinued.
