= Higashiosaka College =

Coordinates: 34°40′31″N 135°34′54″E

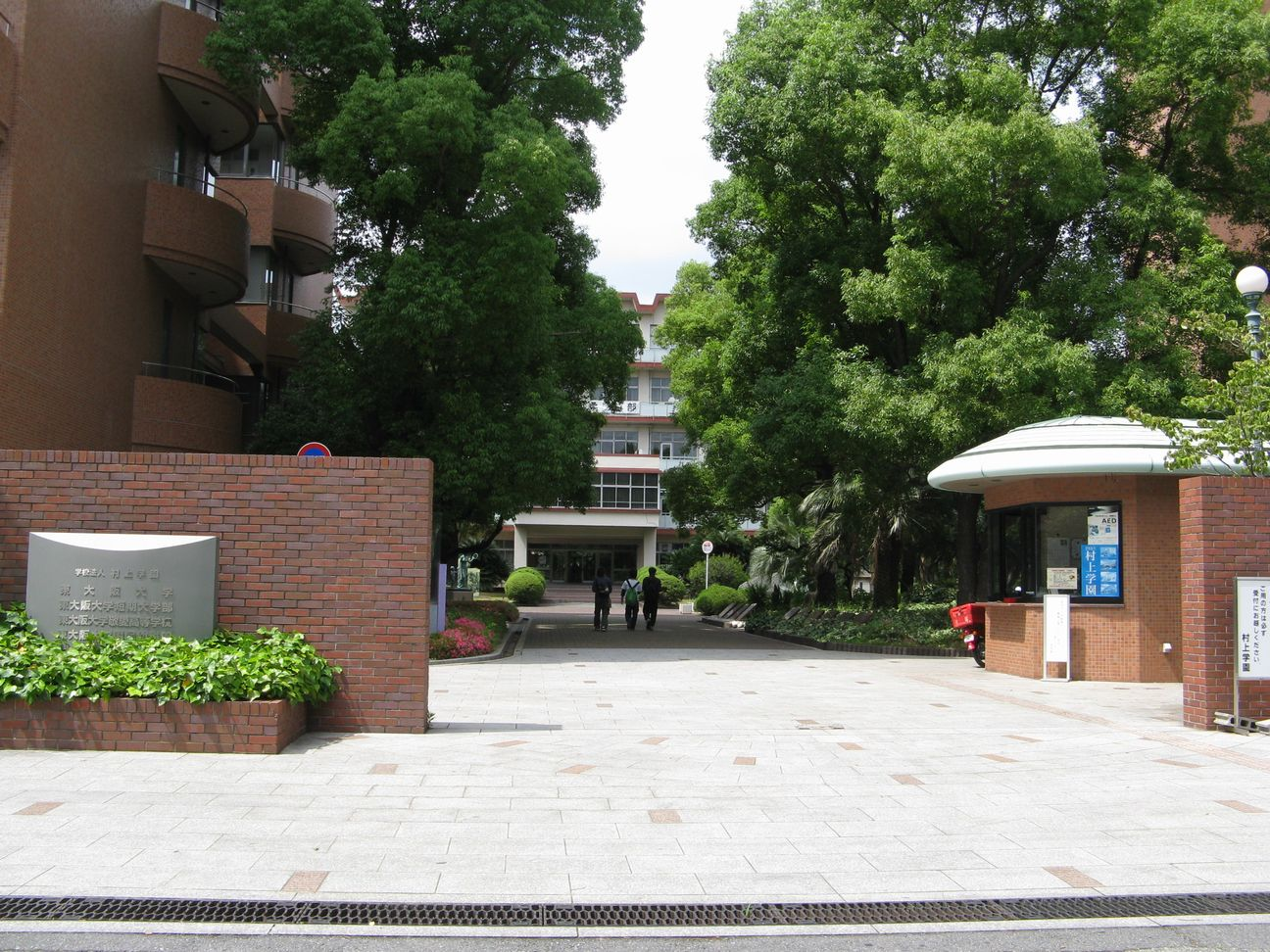
Gate to Higashiosaka College

Higashiosaka College (東大阪大学, Higashiōsaka daigaku) is a private university in Higashiosaka, Osaka, Japan. The school was founded in 1965 as a junior women's college. After becoming coeducational in 2001, it became a four-year college in 2003.
