= Fukaebashi Station =

Metro station in Osaka, Japan

Coordinates: 34°40′44.73″N 135°33′25.87″E

Fukaebashi Station 深江橋駅
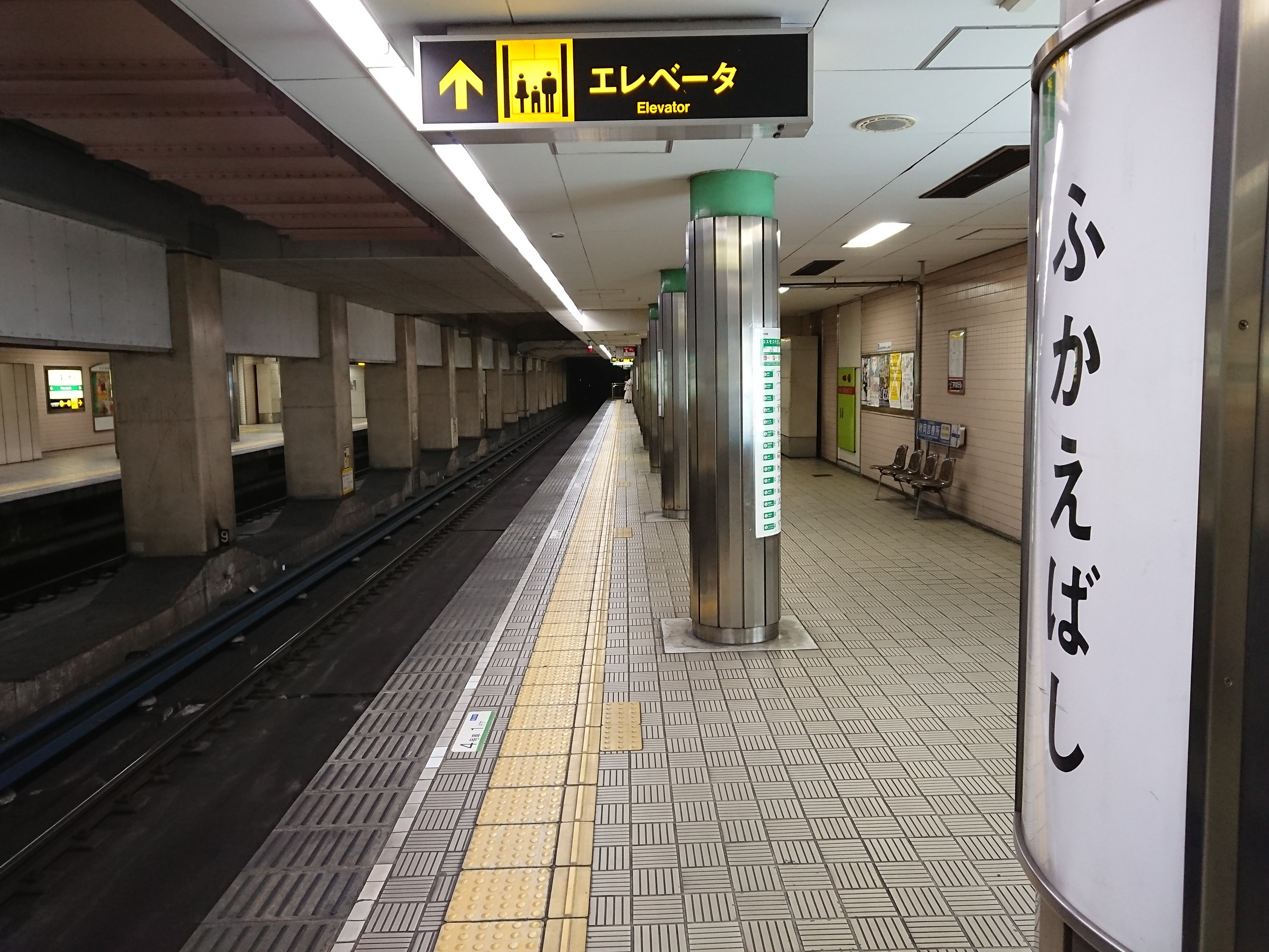
- Platforms (2020)

General information
- System: Osaka Metro
- Operator: Osaka Metro
- Line: Chūō Line
- Platforms: 2 side platforms
- Tracks: 2

Construction
- Structure type: Underground

Other information
- Station code: C 21

History
- Opened: 29 July 1968; 58 years ago

Services
Preceding station	Osaka Metro	Following station
Midoribashi C 20 towards Yumeshima	Chūō Line	Takaida C 22 towards Nagata
Location
- Location within Osaka Prefecture Location within Japan

Fukaebashi Station (深江橋駅) is a railway station on the Osaka Metro Chūō Line in Higashinari-ku, Osaka, Japan.

While this station is situated near the Hanaten station operated by JR West, there are no transfer passageways between the two stations. Passengers transferring between the two stations must leave one station and travel to the other via surface streets (for example on foot or by local transport).

== Layout ==
- There are two side platforms and two tracks under the ground level.

1	■ Chūō Line	for Nagata, Ikoma and Gakken Nara-Tomigaoka

2	■ Chūō Line	for Morinomiya, Tanimachi Yonchome, Osakako and Yumeshima

== Surrounding area ==
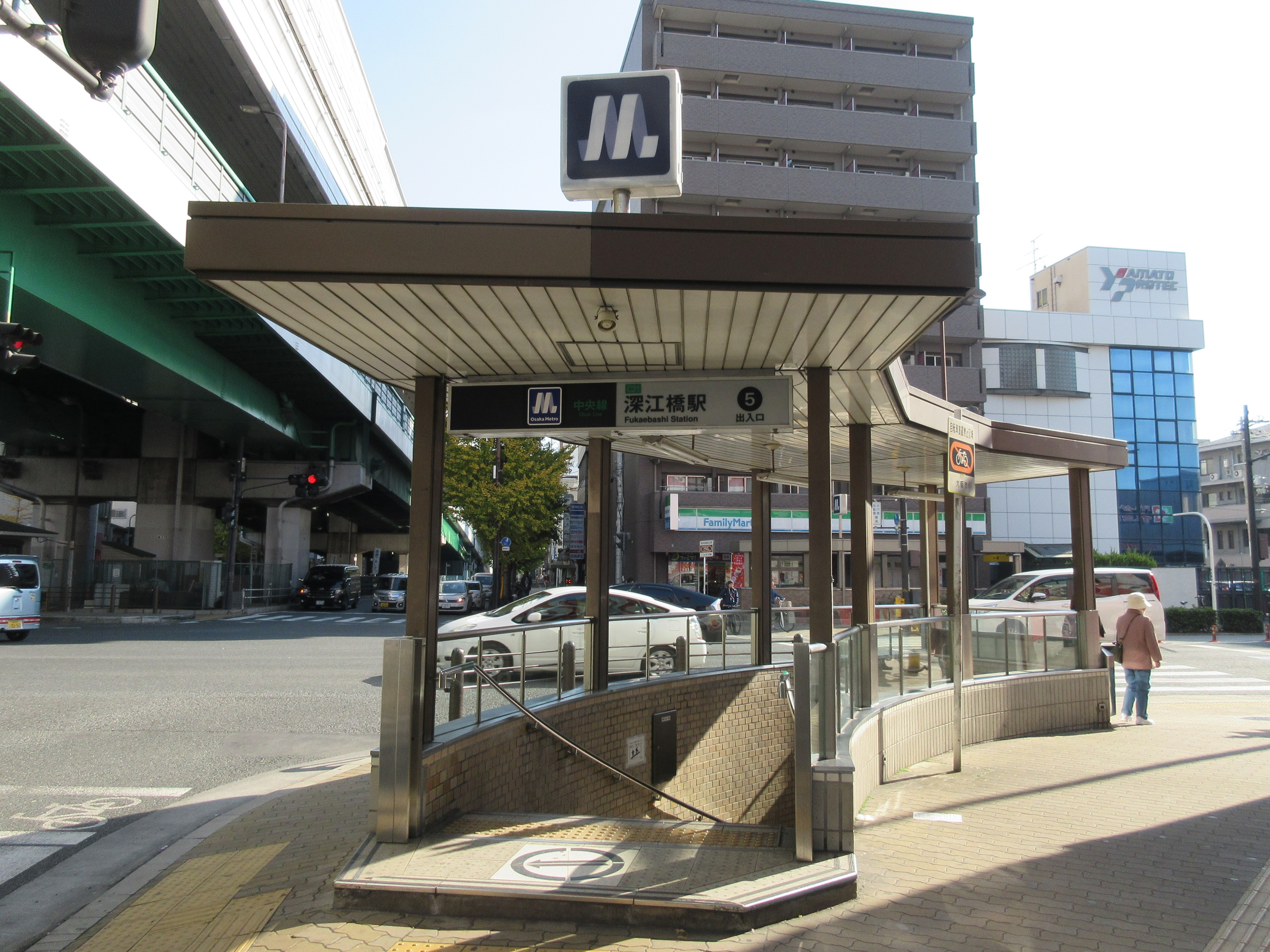
Osaka Metro Fukaebashi Station

This industrial area of East Osaka features mostly factories and residential areas.
