= Kusaka Shell Mound =

Archaeological site in Japan

- 日下貝塚 (Japanese)
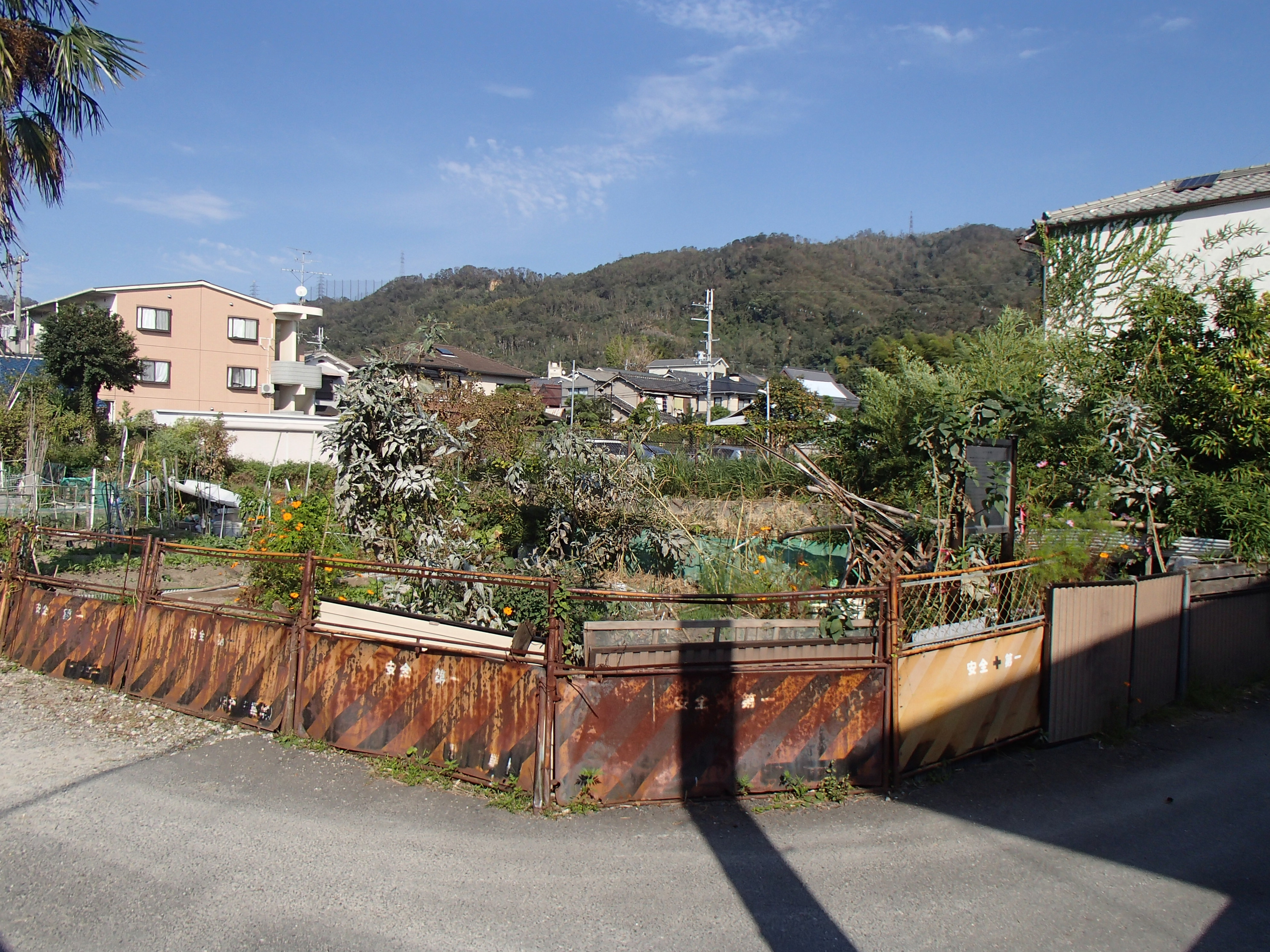
- Kusaka Shell Mound

- Kusaka Shell Mound Kusaka Shell Mound (Japan)
- Interactive map of Kusaka Shell Mound
- 34°41′31.7″N 135°38′53.9″E
- Type: shell midden
- Periods: Jōmon period
- Location: Higashiōsaka, Osaka, Japan
- Region: Kansai region

Site notes
- Public access: Yes (no public facilities)

The Kusaka Shell Midden (日下貝塚, Kusaka kaizuka) is an archaeological site in the Kusaka neighborhood of the city of Higashiōsaka, Osaka Prefecture, in the Kansai region of Japan containing a Jōmon period shell midden. It was designated a National Historic Site of Japan in 1972.

== Overview ==
During the early to middle Jōmon period (approximately 4000 to 2500 BC), sea levels were five to six meters higher than at present, and the ambient temperature was also 2 deg C higher. During this period, the Kansai region was inhabited by the Jōmon people, many of whom lived in coastal settlements. The middens associated with such settlements contain bone, botanical material, mollusc shells, sherds, lithics, and other artifacts and ecofacts associated with the now-vanished inhabitants, and these features, provide a useful source into the diets and habits of Jōmon society. Most of these middens are found along the Pacific coast of Japan.

The Kusaka midden is located at the tip of an alluvial fan formed at the western foot of Mount Ikoma. It is unusual that the majority (99%) of the shell found within are from freshwater shellfish, mostly Seta-shijimi, with diameters of 24–30 mm, but also nine other freshwater species. However, in the lower layers of the middle were 13 species of saltwater clams, including sazae and oysters. Around 6000 BC the midden was located on a lagoon (Kawachi Bay) which extended from Osaka Bay inland into the Kawachi Plain due to the Holocene glacial retreat. As sea levels rose, the lagoon transitioned into a brackish and then a freshwater lake, as "documented" by the change in species of shellfish. In addition to the shells and fish bones, the middens yielded 34 sets of human remains, mostly burials in various positions, and in which teeth have been ritually removed. Other artifacts found in excavations include a large amount of Jōmon pottery, stone tools, bone tools, dogū figurines and animal bones, including that of a horse.

The discovery of the ruins dates back to the early twentieth century. In 1952, Jōmon pottery excavated from the Kusaka shell mound included the Kamegaoka style pottery from the late Jōmon period in the Tōhoku region. This was the first time that pottery from the late Jomon period in the Tōhoku region had been confirmed in the Kansai region. After World War II, the site was excavated in 1960, and 1966. The site is located a 20-minute walk from Ishikiri Station on the Kintetsu Railway Kintetsu Nara Line.

== See also ==
- List of Historic Sites of Japan (Osaka)
