= Kōnoike Shinden =

Kōnoike Shinden Kaisho
- 鴻池新田
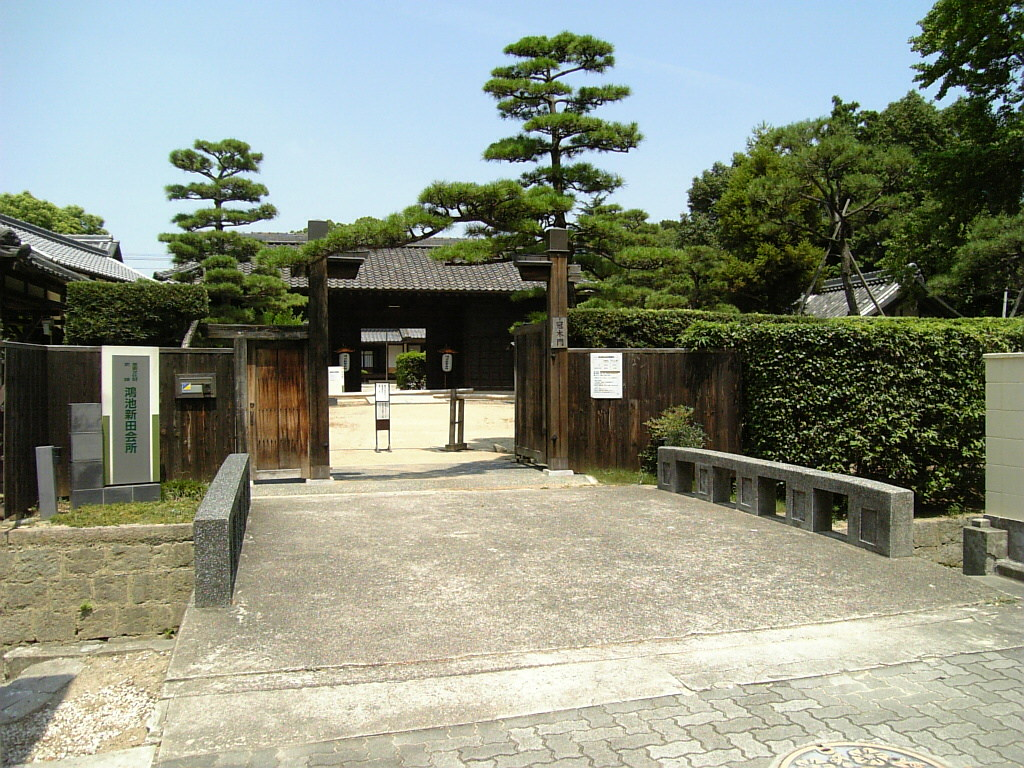
- Kōnoike Shinden Kaisho

- Location within Osaka Prefecture Location within Japan

General information
- Location: Higashiōsaka, Osaka Prefecture, Japan
- Coordinates: 34°41′53.7″N 135°35′59.3″E
- Opened: 1707
- Owner: Higashiōsaka City

Website
- Official website
- National Historic Site of Japan Important Cultural Property

The Konoike Shinden (鴻池新田) was a new land development undertaken by a wealthy Osaka merchant, Konoike Zen'emon in mid-Edo Period Japan. It was located in central Kawachi Province in what is now part of the city of Higashiōsaka, Osaka Prefecture, Japan. The well-preserved buildings of the management office of the settlement were designated a National Historic Site of Japan in 1976.

== Overview ==
In 1704, the Tokugawa shogunate completed a large-scale flood control project which diverted the course of the Yamato River and drained a large lake in what is now the northern portion of Higashiosaka. This resulted in a large tract of land becoming available for paddy fields. A wealthy Osaka merchant, the Konoike family, won a bid for development rights over a 119 hectare area, and settled farmers from afar away as Ise Province on these new lands. The main place of residence for settlers was named Konoikehonmachi, which had many waterways, as the settlers used boats for transportation of the harvested rice to the central warehouse. With the establishment of the modern municipalities system in 1889, the area became part of the village of Kitae in Nakakawachi District Osaka. After World War II, a large portion of the area was transformed into a residential area; however, the 13th generation of the original settlers still farm a portion of the land.

The Kōnoike Shinden Kaisho (鴻池新田会所) was completed in 1707 as the management office of the settlement. The office was responsible for the maintenance and repair of fields, waterways, and bridges, collecting taxes and tenant's fees, official registration of households, pensions for the elderly, and providing police and other public services. It was located in a trapezoidal area surrounded by moats and a wall, and contained five buildings: the main office, Warehouses, Library, Granary and Tool Shed. All of these buildings have survived in good condition, and were designated as a National Important Cultural Properties in 1980. They are currently owned and managed by Higashiosaka City and were opened to the public as a museum in 1997. It is about a five-minute walk from Konoikeshinden Station on the JR West Katamachi Line.

== Gallery ==
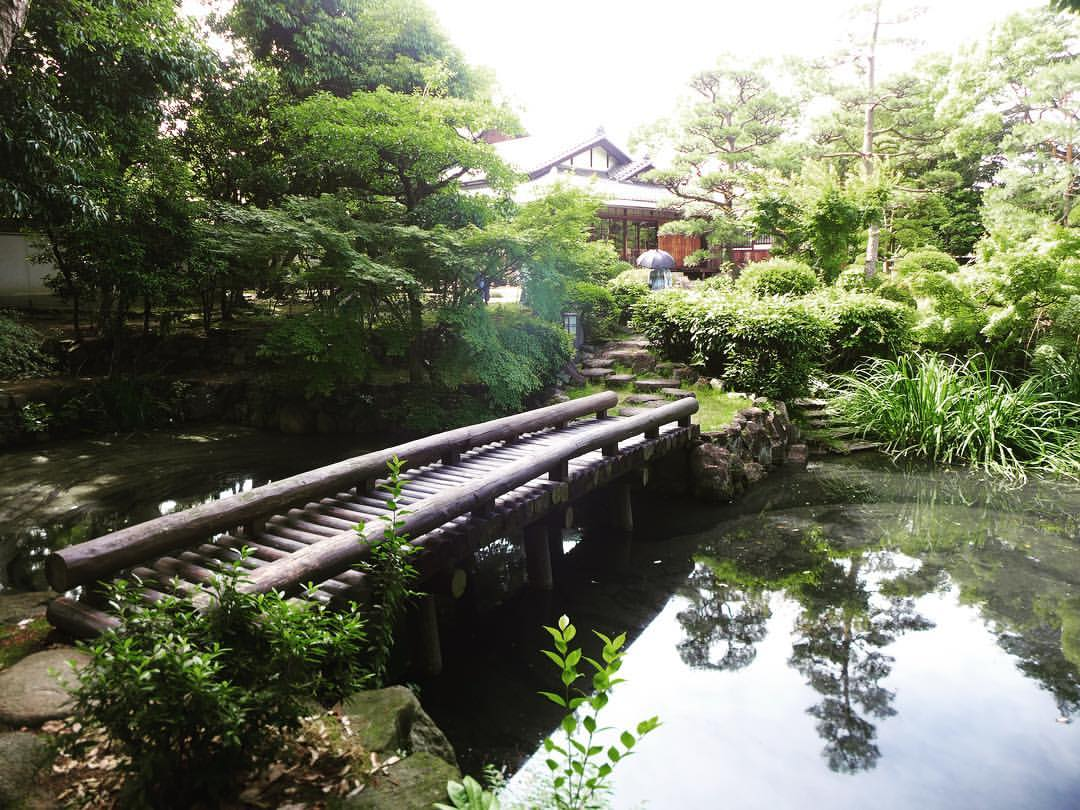
Konoike Shinden Kaisho garden

== See also ==
- List of Historic Sites of Japan (Osaka)
