= 2006 Higashiōsaka mayoral election =

Higashi-osaka held a mayoral election on July 2, 2006. The election was won by JCP candidate Nagao Junzo. Both candidates did run as independents but were supported by different political fractions.

Mayoral election 2005: Higashi-osaka
Party	Candidate	Votes	%	±%
Independent (JCP)	Junzo Nagao (長尾 淳三)	51,821		
Independent	Masanobu Matsumi (松見 正宣)	50,842		
Independent	Shigeru Nishino (西野 茂)	38,151		
Turnout			36.03	
