= 2006 Higashiosaka by-election =

Local election in Japan

Higashi-osaka held a by-election on August 6 for two seats for the Osaka Prefectural Assembly. One seat went to Liberal Democratic Party candidate Kōichi Nishino and the second to Japanese Communist Party candidate Makoto Kuchihara.

== Candidates ==
The candidates, who were all male, were as follows:

- Yoshiaki Aono (青野 剛暁, Aono Yoshiaki), later Osaka Prefectural Assemblyman, age 32
- Makoto Kuchihara (朽原 亮, Kuchihara Makoto), 2003 council candidate at Higashi-osaka, age 46
- Kōichi Munekiyo (宗清 皇一, Munekiyo Kōichi), later member of the House of Representatives, age 35
- Kōichi Nishino (西野 弘一, Nishino Kōichi), later member of the House of Representatives, age 37
- Daisuke Tsukioka (月岡 大介, Tsukioka Daisuke), former councillor at Higashi-osaka, age 33

== Results ==
2006 Higashiosaka by-election
Party	Candidate	Votes	%	±%
LDP	Kōichi Nishino	21,726.6		
JCP	Makoto Kuchihara	21,563		
Independent	Kōichi Munekiyo	17,413.4		
LDP	Yoshiaki Aono	12,462		
Independent	Daisuke Tsukioka	8,385		
Turnout			20.83	
