= Yoshita Station =

Railway station in Higashiōsaka, Osaka Prefecture, Japan

Yoshita Station 吉田駅
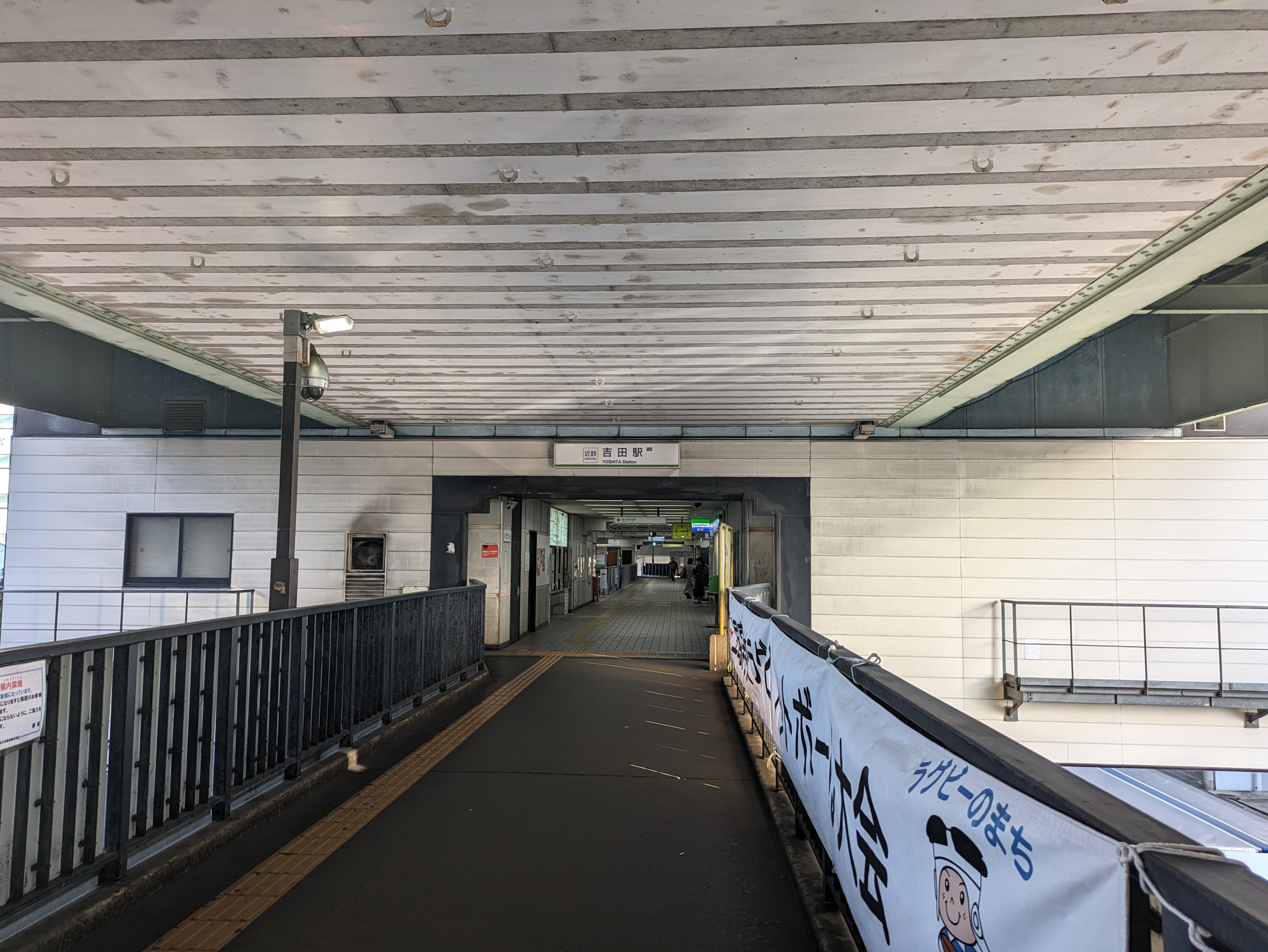
- Yoshita Station west entrance in December 2023

General information
- Location: 1-6, Imagome 1-chome, Higashiōsaka-shi, Osaka-fu （大阪府東大阪市今米一丁目1-6） Japan
- Coordinates: 34°40′49.05″N 135°37′26.9″E
- System: Kintetsu Railway rapid transit station
- Operator: Kintetsu Railway
- Line: Keihanna Line
- Distance: 3.0 km (1.9 mi) from Nagata
- Platforms: 2 side platform
- Tracks: 2

Construction
- Structure type: Elevated

Other information
- Station code: C25
- Website: Official website

History
- Opened: 1 October 1986; 40 years ago

Passengers
- FY2018: 15,369 daily

Services
Preceding station	Kintetsu Railway	Following station
Aramoto towards Yumeshima	Keihanna Line	Shin-Ishikiri towards Gakken Nara-Tomigaoka
Location
- Location within Osaka Prefecture Location within Japan

Yoshita Station (吉田駅, Yoshita-eki) is a passenger railway station in located in the city of Higashiōsaka, Osaka Prefecture, Japan, operated by the private railway operator Kintetsu Railway.

== Lines ==
Yoshita Station is served by the Keihanna Line, and is located 3.0 rail kilometers from the starting point of the line at Nagata Station and 20.9 kilometers from Cosmosquare Station.

== Station layout ==
The station consists of two elevated side platforms with the station building underneath.

=== Platforms ===
1	■ Keihanna Line	for Ikoma and Gakken Nara-Tomigaoka
2	■ Keihanna Line	for Nagata, Hommachi and Yumeshima

== History ==
Yoshita Station opened on October 1, 1986

== Passenger statistics ==
In fiscal 2018, the station was used by an average of 15,369 passengers daily.

== Surrounding area ==
- Higashi Osaka Hanazono Rugby Stadium
- Higashiōsaka Buffer Green Park
- Hanazono Central Park

== See also ==
- List of railway stations in Japan
