= Tower House (Tokyo) =

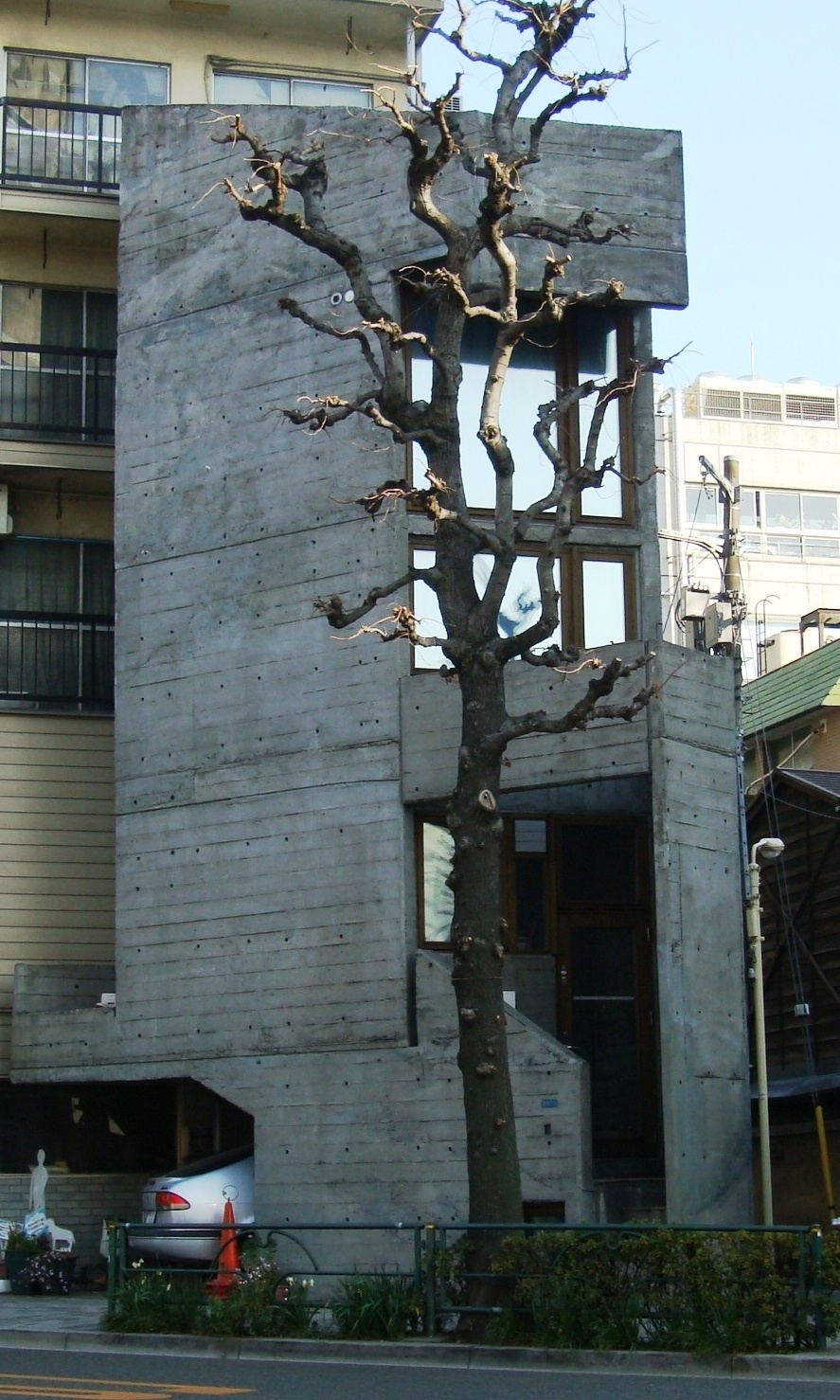
The Tower House (1966)

The Tower House or Azuma Residence (塔の家 - Tō no i.e.) was built in 1966 by the Japanese architect Takamitsu Azuma. Built of concrete on a 20 square-metre plot around a central staircase, it ascends six levels.

Designed as a continual vertical room for the architect's own family, the staircase represents the core of the house. It connects the individual rooms, which are "piled" one on top of the other without any doors separating them.

The building served as a forerunner to the evolution of the architectural landscape of Tokyo.

"When completed, it was the "skyscraper" of Jingumae, nowadays it is a miniature house"
