= Takaida-Chūō Station =

Railway station in Higashiōsaka, Osaka Prefecture, Japan

Takaida-Chūō Station 高井田中央駅
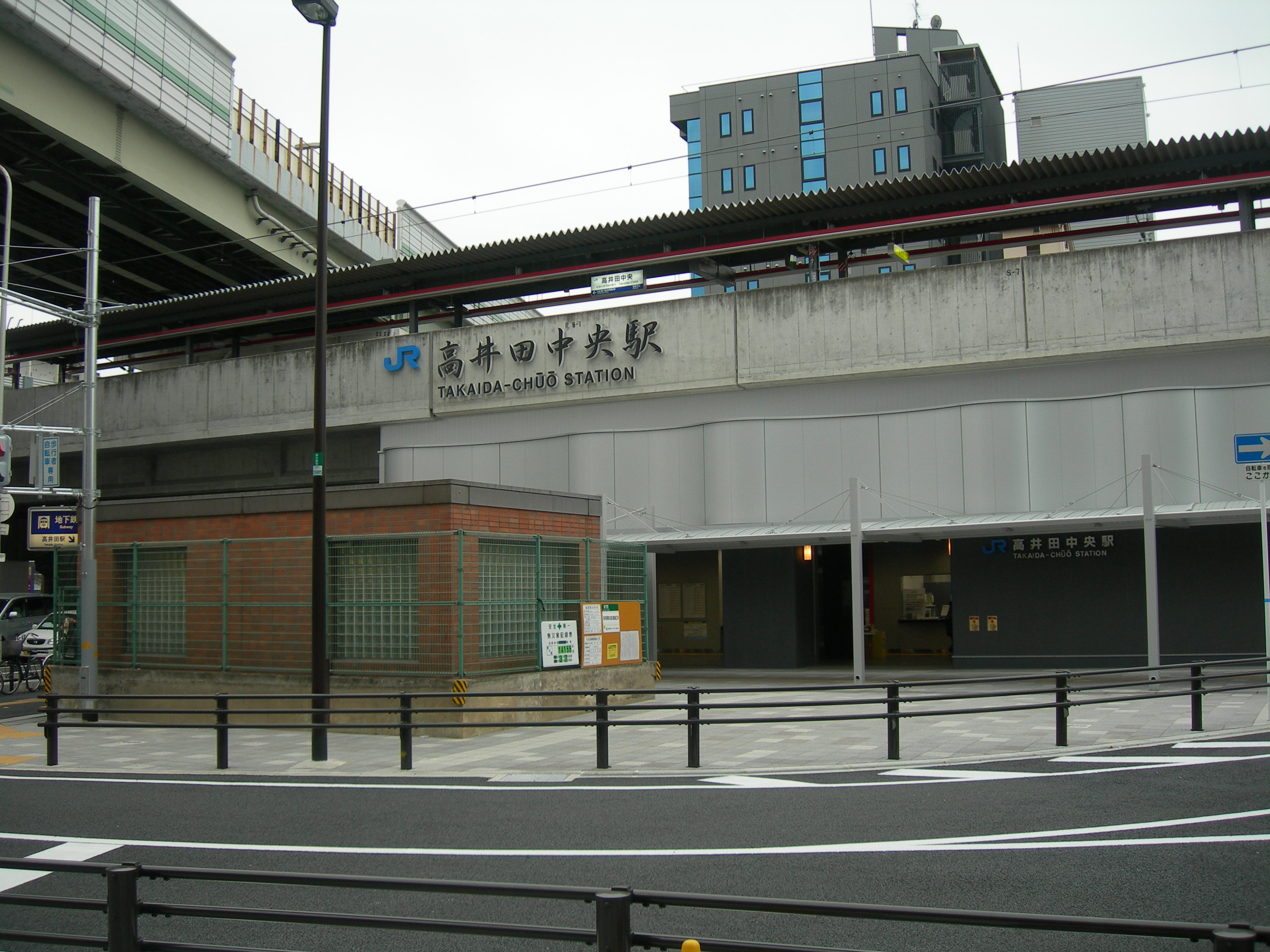
- Takaida-Chūō Station, March 2008

General information
- Location: 1-1-1 Kawamata, Higashiōsaka-shi, Osaka-fu 577-0063; Japan
- Coordinates: 34°40′44.81″N 135°34′20.87″E
- System: JR-West commuter rail station
- Owner: Osaka Soto-Kanjo Railway Co., Ltd.
- Operator: West Japan Railway Company
- Line: F Osaka Higashi Line
- Distance: 12.7 km from Shin-Osaka
- Platforms: 1 island platform

Construction
- Structure type: elevated

Other information
- Station code: JR-F09
- Website: Official website

History
- Opened: March 15, 2008

Passengers
- FY2019: 6,526 daily
Location
- Location within Osaka Prefecture Location within Japan

Takaida-Chūō Station (高井田中央駅, Takaida-Chūō-eki; station number:JR-F09) is a passenger railway station located in the city of Higashiōsaka, Osaka Prefecture, Japan, operated by the West Japan Railway Company (JR West). It is directly above but not connected with the Osaka Metro Takaida Station. There are no direct transfers between the two stations. Passengers transferring between the two stations must transfer at street level.

== Lines ==
Takaida-Chūō Station is served by the Osaka Higashi Line, and is located 12.7 kilometers from Shin-Osaka Station.

== Station layout ==
The station has one elevated island platform, capable of accommodating eight-car trains, with the station building underneath. The station is staffed.

=== Platforms ===
1	■ F Osaka Higashi Line	for Shin-Osaka
2	■ F Osaka Higashi Line	for Kyūhōji

== Adjacent stations ==
«	Service	»
Osaka Higashi Line
Hanaten	Local	JR Kawachi-Eiwa
Hanaten	Direct Rapid Service	JR Kawachi-Eiwa

== History ==
The station was opened on 15 March 2008.

== Passenger statistics ==
In fiscal 2019, the station was used by an average of 6,526 passengers daily (boarding passengers only).

== Surrounding area ==
- Osaka Metro Takaida Station
- Nagase River
- Higashi Osaka City Takaida Junior High School

== See also ==
- List of railway stations in Japan
