= AIDA interactive educational freeware diabetes simulator =

Medical simulation computer program

AIDA is a freeware computer program that permits the interactive simulation of plasma insulin and blood glucose profiles for demonstration, teaching, self-learning, and research purposes. Originally developed in 1991, it has been updated and enhanced since, and made available without charge from 1996 on the World Wide Web. The program, which is still being updated, has gone through a number of revisions and developments in the 16+ years since its original internet launch. Further copies of the simulator have been made available, in the past, on diskette by the system developers and from the British Diabetic Association (BDA) — now called 'Diabetes UK' — London, England, following the BDA's own independent evaluation of the software. More than 1,075,000 diabetes simulations have been run via a web-based version of the AIDA diabetes simulator.

The AIDA software is intended to serve as an educational support tool and can be used by anyone — person with diabetes, relative of a patient, health care professional (doctor, nurse, clinical diabetes educator, dietician, pharmacist, etc.), or student — even if they may have minimal knowledge of the pathophysiology of diabetes mellitus.

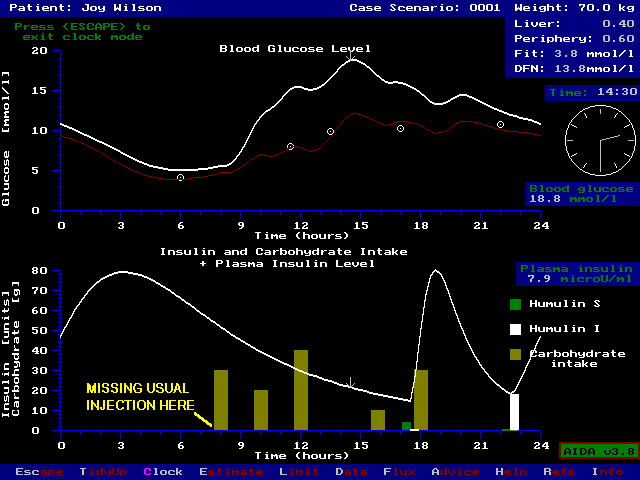
Simulation from AIDA downloadable freeware diabetes simulator showing the effect of omitting a morning insulin injection (before breakfast at 8am). This would send the simulated virtual person with diabetes ('Joy Wilson' [pseudonym]) markedly hyperglycemic in the afternoon (with a predicted blood glucose level of 18.8 mmol/L [338 mg/dL] at 2:30pm) — and leave her at significant risk of developing diabetic ketoacidosis. The simulated blood glucose profile is shown in the upper graph, and the carbohydrate intake and insulin injections are shown in the lower graph, with the simulated plasma insulin profile shown superimposed on the lower graph. The missed usual insulin injection is shown highlighted in yellow.

== Overview of AIDA physiological model ==
AIDA has been described in detail in the medical / scientific / computing / diabetes literature. It incorporates a compartmental model that describes glucose-insulin interaction in people completely lacking endogenous insulin secretion — i.e. insulin-dependent patients with type 1 diabetes mellitus. The AIDA model contains a single extra-cellular glucose compartment into which glucose enters via both absorption from the intestine and glucose production from the liver. The model also contains separate compartments for plasma and 'active' insulin, the latter being responsible for glycemic control while insulin is removed from the former by liver degradation. Full details of the AIDA model are accessible from within the AIDA software package, and can be viewed and printed separately via the AIDA website.

== Limitations of model ==
AIDA, like other model-based approaches, is not sufficiently accurate to be used for individual patient simulation or glycemic prediction. Therefore, as the program makes clear, it is not intended for insulin therapy planning and can only be used for teaching, self-learning, demonstration, or research purposes. While the AIDA software can simulate a wide variety of insulin dosage and diet (nutrition) adjustments, it should be stressed that the purpose of AIDA is to create a learning environment for communicating and training intuitive thinking when dealing with such adjustments. In this respect AIDA appears most of use for recreating clinical situations in diabetes care, rather than trying to predict best outcome.

== Downloadable & on-line versions ==
The AIDA diabetes simulator comes in two forms.

- A free downloadable (PC) version — latest release AIDA v4.3b — which also works on Apple Macintosh computers running PC emulation software.
- A web-based version — called AIDA on-line — available to use via a standard web browser.

== Use as an educational tool ==
The AIDA software comes with forty educational case scenarios as standard, each of which represents a 'snapshot' of the metabolic status of a typical person with respect to insulin-dependent type 1 diabetes mellitus. It is easy for users to add or create further case scenarios, as required. Examples of the application of AIDA as an educational tool can be found in various published journal articles.

== Simulating glycated hemoglobin (HbA_{1c}) levels ==
Glycated hemoglobin (HbA_{1c}) levels are widely regarded as a marker of medium-term blood glucose control and are extensively applied clinically as an indicator of a person's average or integrated glycemic control over the preceding 2–3 months. Diabetologists, endocrinologists, diabetes specialist nurses and diabetes educators use assessments of HbA_{1c} levels to confirm overall blood glucose control; this test having the advantage of not being dependent on patient self-reported blood glucose data.

Since the year 2000, an estimate or simulation of HbA_{1c} levels has been incorporated within the AIDA program. This offers people with diabetes, their relatives, students, health-care professionals and other users an indication of what the HbA_{1c} level might be if the simulated blood glucose profile was maintained for 2–3 months. The AIDA developers stress that such HbA_{1c} level estimations, like AIDA's main blood glucose simulations, are only intended for educational / teaching, self-learning or demonstration purposes, and not meant for individual patient prediction or therapy planning.

== Teaching using simulator ==
User comments about AIDA have highlighted some of the many ways in which people have applied the simulations in their own particular situations. A great deal of attention has focused, understandably, on use by individuals with diabetes and their relatives, as well as by health-care professionals such as diabetologists / endocrinologists and diabetes educators. However, an important group of health-carers involved in the provision of day-today care for many people with diabetes are primary care physicians (general practitioners [GPs]). A workshop was held in September 2000 in Italy — by an independent diabetologist / endocrinologist unconnected with the AIDA simulator's development — to gain experience with application of the AIDA diabetes simulation approach as a teaching tool for general practitioners (GPs). Feedback obtained from participants attending the workshop was very positive, with GPs reporting the simulation approach to be both of interest and use.

Another important group of health-carers involved in the provision of day-to-day care for many people with diabetes are nurses. A separate workshop was held in June 2001 in Italy — by the same independent diabetologist / endocrinologist — to gain experience with application of the AIDA diabetes simulation approach as a teaching tool for student nurses. Feedback obtained from participants attending the workshop was generally very positive, with the student nurses also reporting the simulation approach to be both of interest and of use.

== High-school student teaching with AIDA on-line ==
The lifetime risk of developing diabetes for students born since the year 2000 in the United States is estimated to be 27% to 52%. Many students need to learn about diabetes for their personal care, or for the care of relatives, or desire to learn about diabetes to develop a career in healthcare. Most teenagers are adept at learning through web-based computer tools. Against this background, 21 students entering the 8th and 9th grades (aged 12 to 14 years old) enrolled in a Biotechnology Summer Camp in June 2006 — organized independently by the Georgia Institute of Technology in Atlanta, Georgia (USA) — focusing on diabetes mellitus. Lectures on pathophysiology and clinical aspects of diabetes were followed by simulated cases using the AIDA on-line diabetes software simulator. Two cases demonstrated glycemic effects and pharmacokinetics of insulin administration, diet, and exercise in insulin-dependent type 1 diabetes mellitus and non-insulin-dependent type 2 diabetes mellitus. Students filled out standardized evaluations at the end of the session to assess receptiveness to this type of learning; opinions on the utility, information, and ease of use; and perceived risks of using the on-line simulator to understand diabetes. All students were receptive to this simulator-based educational approach. The majority found AIDA on-line useful (17/21 [81%]), educational (21/21 [100%]), worthy of wider distribution (20/21 [95%]), and would recommend the program to others with diabetes or wanting to learn about diabetes (18/21 [86%]). A minority (2/21 [9.5%]) found the program 'risky' regarding the information given to the students. Positive comments included the ability to visualize concepts being taught in earlier lectures, and recognized the rigors required to manage diabetes. Fewer negative comments reflected frustration with the web-based user interface, the course materials, or difficulty in achieving good simulated glycemic control. The study authors concluded that: "Teaching pathophysiology of diabetes and pharmacology of insulin to middle school students is enhanced with the AIDA on-line diabetes simulator. Future versions of this program, and development of similar programs, could be useful in teaching adolescents who have diabetes, and might help stimulate interested students to learn more about the care of people with diabetes".

== Randomised controlled trial (RCT) ==
The AIDA diabetes simulator has been tested out in a pilot randomised controlled trial (RCT). The protocol used for the RCT was described a priori in the medical / diabetes literature. The study sought to assess whether diabetes educational teaching sessions using the AIDA simulator led to better outcomes than similar diabetes educational teaching sessions without a computer. The study was run at the Ospedale di Marino, near Rome, in Italy by an independent diabetologist / endocrinologist – unconnected with the simulator's development. Twenty-four volunteers (12 male and 12 female) with type 1 diabetes of more than 6-years duration, aged 19–48 years, who gave written informed consent, were randomly assigned to one of two study groups, each receiving different teaching interventions. Group A was exposed to the AIDA diabetes simulator, while Group B (the control group) received conventional lessons with slides and transparencies. Six lessons were held for each group (one per week). At the beginning and end of the study all subjects had their glycated hemoglobin (HbA_{1c}) measured. The subjects also carefully documented the incidence of any symptomatic hypoglycaemic episodes ('hypos'), whether mild (sweating, dizziness), moderate (nausea, vomiting), or severe (requiring assistance).

The results seem encouraging. HbA_{1c} levels in Group A dropped significantly from 7.2% to 6.4% after lessons with the diabetes simulator (p = 0.01). No significant changes in HbA_{1c} were observed in the control group (Group B) between baseline (7.1%) and the end of the control lessons (7.0%). The number of 'hypos' decreased significantly from 31 to 14 in Group A (p = 0.03) after AIDA lessons, but did not change significantly in Group B from baseline (n = 20) to after the control lessons (n = 22). Full details of the study and the results can be found in the medical / diabetes literature. The study authors concluded that "larger trials involving more patients in more centres are clearly needed, but this proof-of-concept (pilot) study does demonstrate the feasibility of using a prospective randomised controlled trial approach for the evaluation of educational diabetes simulation software such as AIDA".

== Diabetes / Insulin Tutorial ==
There is an abundance of textual / static graphical information about insulin and diabetes on the web. However an AIDA-based Diabetes / Insulin Tutorial has been developed. The tutorial is unusual in that — in addition to offering textual / static graphical information about insulin and diabetes — it is also integrated with the AIDA on-line web-based diabetes simulator. In this way, visitors can not only read about insulin dosage adjustment in diabetes, but also interactively simulate examples of what they are learning about. The tutorial is currently arranged in four sections: (1) Insulin-dosage adjustment, (2) Choosing the insulin dose, (3) Timing of meals & diet planning, and (4) Glucose & the kidney.

== Guidelines for health-carers planning to teach with AIDA ==
An independent diabetologist / endocrinologist — unconnected with AIDA's development — has teamed up with one of the AIDA developers to highlight ways in which health-carer professionals may improve the outcome of lessons that make use of the simulator. Among the most important points highlighted seem to be the preparation of the teacher, consideration of how to impart preliminary information to help people understand the pathophysiology of diabetes, the optimum selection of topics to be covered, the arrangement of the lessons, how to involve each of the participants, and how to deal with questions. Other important issues include how to spot and deal with some of the difficulties that may be encountered by participants who apparently seem uninterested, obtaining feedback from the lessons, and practical ideas about how to lead a class. Guidelines for health-care professionals planning to teach with AIDA have been published in the diabetes literature.

The same authors have also put together some recommended training requirements for health-carers planning to teach using the AIDA interactive educational diabetes simulator. The researchers have set out to answer possible questions from teachers using the program, highlight some minimum recommended training requirements for the software, suggest some "hints and tips" for teaching ideas, explain the importance of performing more studies / trials with the program, overview randomised controlled trial usage of the software, and highlight the importance of obtaining feedback from lesson participants. The recommendations seem to be straightforward and should help in formalising training with the program, as well as in the development of a network of teachers "accredited" to give lessons using the software.

== User reviews ==
Independent user reviews of the AIDA software can be found in the medical / diabetes / computing literature. The AIDA diabetes simulator has been independently selected for inclusion in the United Kingdom National Health Service National Library for Health Diabetes Specialist Library list of Web resources.

== Non-insulin dependent (type 2) diabetes mellitus ==
The current releases of the downloadable AIDA software, and AIDA on-line, do not incorporate functions to model endogenous insulin secretion — which takes place in people with non-insulin dependent diabetes mellitus type 2, and healthy subjects without diabetes. Nevertheless, a wide number of people with insulin-treated type 2 diabetes mellitus have reported finding the AIDA diabetes simulator of use for learning about balancing insulin and diet in diabetes. This is because many of the principles of insulin dosage adjustment are remarkably similar in both type 1 and type 2 diabetes mellitus, and even without an endogenous insulin secretion model function, AIDA still can offer realistic simulations (from an educational perspective) for people with non-insulin dependent (type 2) diabetes mellitus. The AIDA developers have published a research paper in 2011 which includes reference to the incorporation of a dedicated function for pancreatic insulin secretion — to be added to a future release of the simulator.

== Further developments ==
Given the widespread usage of the AIDA diabetes simulation software, there has been considerable interest worldwide in updates to the program. Work has been reported in the scientific literature into the incorporation of lispro (Humalog)-like rapidly acting insulin analogues, and the glargine (Lantus) very long-acting insulin analogue, into the freeware diabetes simulator. Further information can be found in the medical / scientific literature. A beta release of AIDA [v4.5c (beta)] incorporating lispro, regular, NPH and glargine insulins is available for download from the AIDA website. AIDA v4.5c (beta) is still undergoing testing / further development but has been available without charge from the AIDA website since 2012.

== Research use ==
Separate from its utility as an educational, self-learning, or teaching tool for people with diabetes and their relatives / carers, students and health-care professionals — various research groups around the world have found the freeware AIDA diabetes simulator of use as a way of generating large quantities of realistic blood glucose data for developing and testing out their own diabetes computing prototypes (e.g. for training artificial neural networks, or other decision support research prototypes). Various published examples of this research approach can be found in the scientific literature.

== Appendix: Download surveys / evaluations ==
The AIDA developers have undertaken a range of surveys and evaluations of usage of the AIDA diabetes simulator — to better understand who is downloading the program, and why.

One initial study analysed data from 1,360 downloads of the AIDA software. The intended goals of the survey were: (i) to establish the feasibility of using the Internet for auditing and surveying diabetes software users; (ii) to identify the proportion of people with diabetes and their relatives who are actually making use of the program; and (iii) to establish certain technical details about downloaders' computer setups to facilitate the distribution of upgrades to the software. 1,360 responses were received over an 8-month period (from November 1999 to July 2000). During the corresponding period 3,821 actual downloads of the software were independently logged at the Website — giving a response rate to this survey of 35.6%. Responses were received from participants in 67 countries — although over half of these (n=730, 54%) originated from the US and UK. 762 responses (56%) were received from people with diabetes and 184 (13.5%) from relatives of patients, with lesser numbers from doctors, students, diabetes educators, nurses, pharmacists, and other end users. Useful technical information about computers and operating systems being used were also obtained. The initial study established the feasibility of using the Internet to survey, at no real cost, a large number of medical software downloaders / users. In addition it yielded interesting data in terms of who are the main downloaders of the AIDA program, and has also provided technical (computer) information which aided the release of a freeware upgrade to the software.

A second study audited 2,437 separate downloads of the AIDA program. The Internet-based survey methodology was confirmed to be robust and reliable. Over a 7.5-month period (from mid-July 2000 to early March 2001) 2,437 responses were received. During the corresponding period 4,100 actual downloads of the software were independently logged via the same route at the AIDA Website — giving a response rate to this audit of 59.4%. Responses were received from participants in 61 countries — although over half of these (n 5 1,533; 62.9%) originated from the United States and United Kingdom. Of these responses 1,361 (55.8%) were received from people with diabetes and 303 (12.4%) from relatives of patients, with fewer responses from doctors, diabetes educators, students, nurses, pharmacists, and other end users. This study has confirmed the feasibility of using the Internet to survey, at no real cost, a large number of medical software downloaders / users. In addition, it yielded up-to-date and interesting data about who are the main downloaders of the AIDA program.

A third study surveyed downloaders of a more recent release of the program (AIDA v4.3a). Over a 1-year period (from March 2001 to February 2002) in total 3,864 responses were received. During the corresponding period some 8,578 actual downloads of the software were independently logged via the same route at the AIDA Website, giving a response rate for this survey of 45%. Responses were received from participants in 66 countries — over half of these (n=2,137; 55.3%) were from the United States and the United Kingdom. There were 2,318 responses (60.0%) received from people with diabetes and 443 (11.5%) from relatives of patients, with fewer responses from doctors, students, diabetes educators, nurses, pharmacists, and other end users. The authors concluded that the study highlighted "considerable interest amongst patients and their relatives to learn more about balancing insulin and diet in diabetes, as well as possibly to get more involved in self-management of insulin dosages. More computer applications that can cater for this interest in diabetes patient self-care need to be developed and made available. The Internet provides an ideal medium for the distribution of such educational tools".
