= Takaida Station (Higashiōsaka) =

Railway and metro station in Higashiōsaka, Osaka Prefecture, Japan

Takaida Station 高井田駅
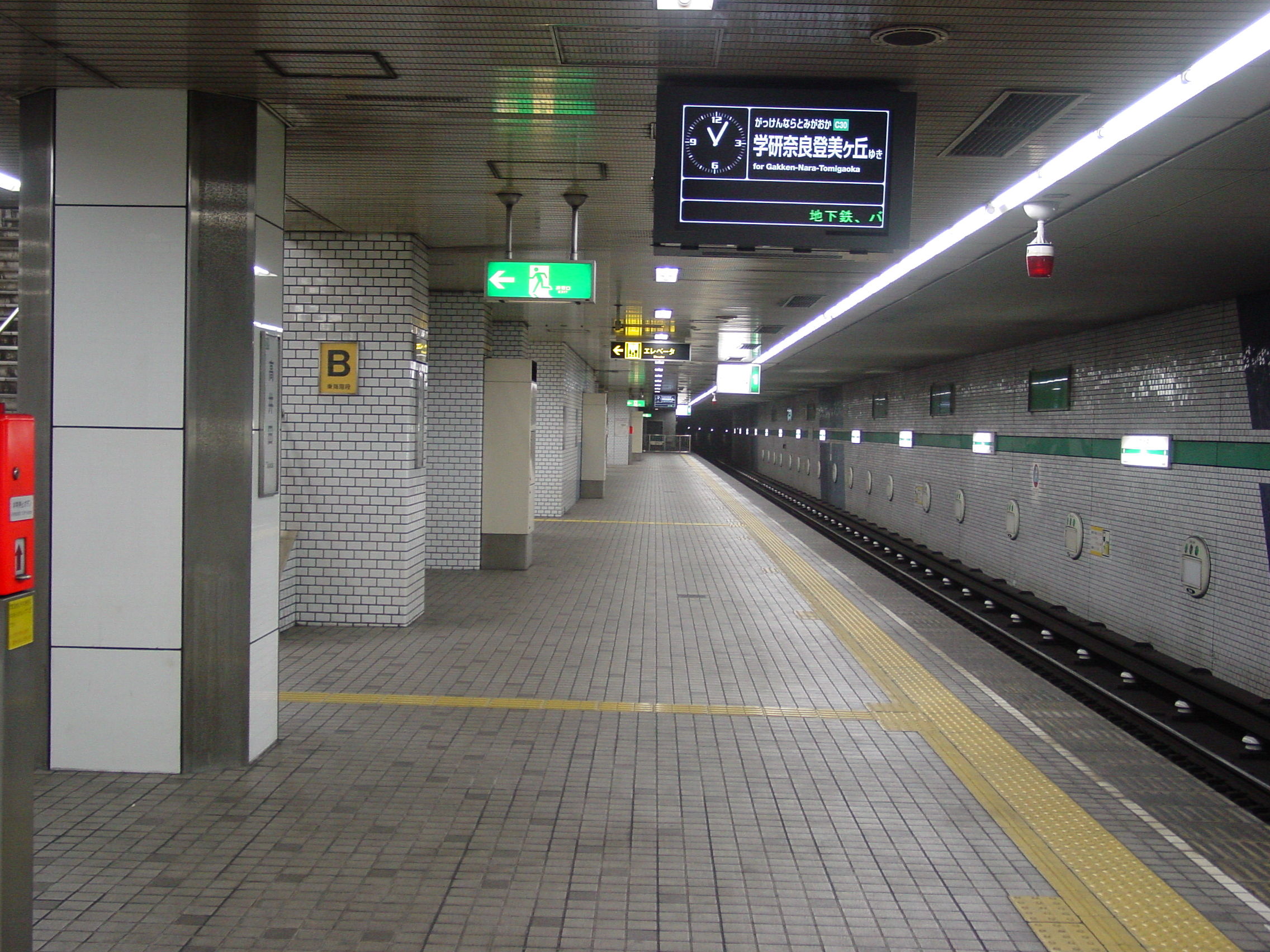
- Nagata-bound subway platform (2009)

General information
- Location: 1-1-1 Kawamata, Higashiōsaka-shi, Osaka-fu 577-0063; Japan
- Coordinates: 34°40′44.81″N 135°34′20.87″E
- System: Osaka Metro
- Operator: Osaka Metro
- Line: Chūō Line
- Distance: 16.1 km (10.0 mi) from Cosmosquare
- Platforms: 1 island platform
- Tracks: 2
- Connections: Takaida-Chūō Station

Construction
- Structure type: Underground

Other information
- Station code: C 22

History
- Opened: 5 April 1985; 41 years ago

Passengers
- FY2019: 17,726 daily

Services
Preceding station	Osaka Metro	Following station
Fukaebashi C 21 towards Yumeshima	Chūō Line	Nagata C 23 Terminus
Location
- Location within Osaka Prefecture Location within Japan

Takaida Station (高井田駅, Takaida-eki) is an underground metro station located in the city of Higashiōsaka, Osaka Prefecture, Japan, operated by the Osaka Metro. It is directly underneath but not connected with the JR West Takaida-Chūō Station. There are no direct transfers between the two stations. Passengers transferring between the two stations must transfer at street level.

== Lines ==
Takaida Station is served by the Chūō Line, and is located 19.3 kilometers from the terminus of the line at Yumeshima Station.

== Station layout ==
The station has one underground island platform, capable of accommodating eight-car trains. The station is staffed.

=== Platforms ===
1	■ Chūō Line	for Nagata, Ikoma and Gakken Nara-Tomigaoka
2	■ Chūō Line	for Morinomiya, Tanimachi Yonchome, Hommachi, Osakako and Yumeshima

== History ==
The station was opened on April 5, 1985.

== Passenger statistics ==
In fiscal 2019, the station was used by an average of 17,726 passengers daily.

== Surrounding area ==
- Nagase River
- Higashi Osaka University

== See also ==
- List of railway stations in Japan
