= Aida Yūji =

Japanese historian (1916–1997)

- 会田 雄次
- Born: 5 March 1916; Kyōto, Japan
- Died: 17 September 1997 (aged 81); Kyōto, Japan
- Occupation: Historian

Aida Yūji (会田 雄次; 5 March 1916 – 17 September 1997) was a Japanese historian specialising in the Renaissance. He was active as a conservative thinker, commentator and major exponent of the Nihonjinron. He was born in Kyōto on 5 March 1916. He graduated from Kyoto University in 1940 and had his master's degree in history interrupted in 1943, when he was drafted into the Imperial Japanese Army. He participated in the Burma campaign of 1944 as an infantryman. He surrendered to the British Army at the war's end and was detained at a prisoner-of-war camp in the British colony of Burma. His experiences in the camp are described in his best-selling memoir, Aaron Shūyōjo (1962). Upon his repatriation in 1947, he began to teach at Kobe University. He was appointed full professor at Kyoto University's Humanities Department in 1952. He retired from the university in 1979, when he became an emeritus professor. He died of pneumonia on 17 September 1997.

== Theory of European Rationalism ==
Aida is best remembered for the theory that the "rationality" of Western civilization was consequential upon the practice of raising and killing livestock. This hypothesis, called the "livestock rearing theory" (家畜飼育説, kachiku shiikusetsu), was set forth in his 1966 book Rationalism (Gōrishugi). He associated the slaughter of domestic animals, which had been hitherto reared with great care, with the nonchalant belligerence of Western soldiers. In his view, Westerners are free from the kind of hysteria Japanese soldiers would often show at the sight of bloodshed. Aida blamed this hysteria for the excessive acts of cruelty that the Japanese were accused of during the Second World War. Westerners, on the other hand, have so long been accustomed to calmly butchering animals that they developed a rational approach to slaughter, which they extended to human conflict. The Japanese hardly had any contact with livestock owing to the Buddhist taboo of eating meat and were too emotive to master the Western sort of nonchalance.

== Works ==
- Kyōdai Seiyōshi: 4, Sōgensha, Tokyo 1951
- Runesansu, Kawade Shobō, Tokyo 1974
- Aaron Shūyōjo Chūō Kōronsha, Tokyo 1962
- Gōrishugi Kōdansha Gendai Shinsho, Tokyo 1966
- Mikeranjiero:Ai to Bi to Shi to Seibundō Shinkōsha, 1963
- Haisha no jōken: Sengoku jidai o kangaeru, Chūō Kōronsha, Tokyo 1965
- Nihonjin no ishiki kôzô, Kôdansha Gendai Shinsho, Tokyo 1972
- Ketsudan no jōken, Shichōsha, 1975
- Chōetsusha no shisō: kami to hito no deai, Kōdansha, Tokyo 1975
- Runesansu no bijutsu to shakai, Sōgensha, Tokyo 1981
- Mikeranjiero: Sono kodoku to Eikō, PHP, Kyoto 1996
- Rekishika no tachiba PHP, Kyoto 1997
