= Row House in Sumiyoshi =

Sumiyoshi building in Osaka, Japan

Coordinates: 34.610535°N 135.49234°E

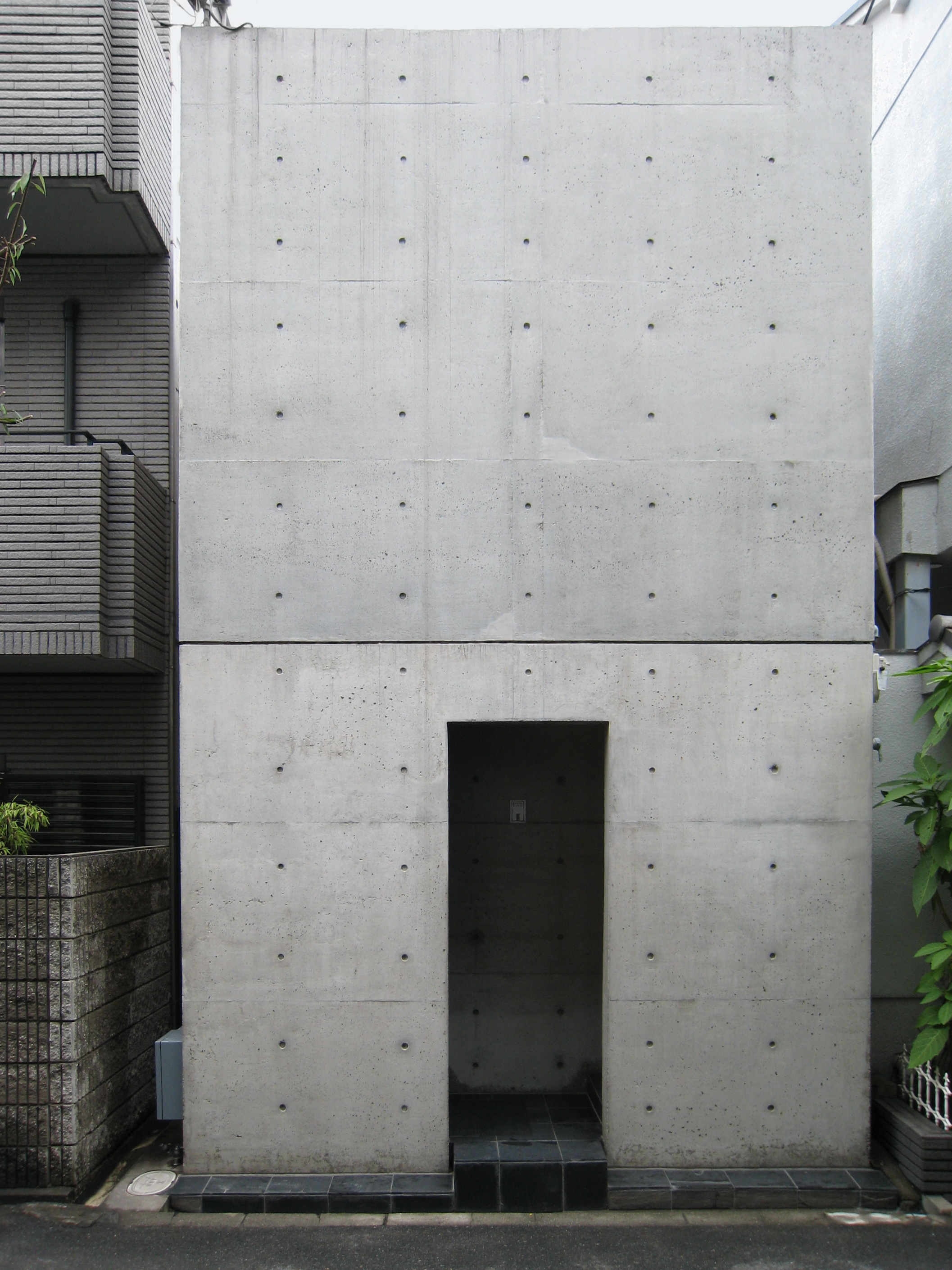
Azuma House

Computer graphics animation of the inside of the Azuma House

Row House in Sumiyoshi (住吉の長屋, Sumiyoshi no Nagaya), also called Azuma House (Japanese 東邸), is a personal residence in Sumiyoshi-ku, Osaka, Japan. It was designed by Japanese architect Tadao Ando in his early career. It was designed without exterior windows reflecting the desire of the owner to feel that he was not "in Japan", but to compensate for lost light, an interior courtyard with cross walkway was created.

Ando's concrete architectural style, reflected in the design of the Azuma House, inspired the set design for the music video of Jamiroquai's "Virtual Insanity".
