= Azerbaijan International Development Agency =

- Azerbaijani: Azərbaycan Respublikasının Beynəlxalq İnkişafa Yardım Agentliyi
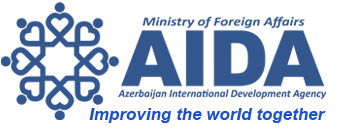

Agency overview
- Formed: September 14, 2011
- Headquarters: Ministry of Foreign Affairs Building, Azerbaijan, Baku
- Website: www.aida.az

The Azerbaijan International Development Agency (AIDA) was established in September 2011 under the Ministry of Foreign Affairs of the Republic of Azerbaijan. AIDA is responsible for the provision of international humanitarian and development assistance by the Republic of Azerbaijan and coordinates activities of all relevant government bodies in this field.

AIDA supports the efforts of developing countries through its programs in the areas of poverty reduction, development of science, culture and health, application of information-communication technologies, various scholarship programs, and humanitarian assistance. AIDA's annual budget is formed by relevant allocations from the state budget. AIDA's activities are structured in line and concurrent with the foreign policy of the Republic of Azerbaijan.

The Agency is managed by the Director appointed by the Minister of Foreign Affairs. AIDA's employees are the employees of the Ministry of Foreign Affairs of the Republic of Azerbaijan. AIDA provides humanitarian and technical assistance to the countries of Africa, Asia and Latin America. More than 90 countries have benefited from the programs implemented by the Azerbaijan Republic.

== Humanitarian Assistance ==
=== Humanitarian aid for flood-affected people, Pakistan ===
AIDA conducted humanitarian aid campaigns in Multan, Muzaffargarh, Layyah, Chinniot, Naroval, Sargodha, Mandi Baha-ud-Din, Sialkot, Jhang and Hafizabad cities of Pakistan in 2014, for the purpose of providing humanitarian assistance to the people affected by flood in Southern Punjab and Kashmir provinces of Pakistan. 25000 flood-affected people benefited from this humanitarian aid provided by AIDA.

=== Gaza ===
In 2014, AIDA provided assistance to Gaza for recovering the destructions in the result of the armed clashes. The aid was provided via the United Nations Relief and Works Agency for Palestine Refugees in the Near East (UNRWA). Earlier, in response to the United Nations Security Council statement of November 21, 2012 on situation in Gaza, which stressed the urgency of suspension of clashes and prevention of sharp deterioration in humanitarian situation by calling upon international community to assist in restoration of peaceful life and to provide humanitarian aid in order to relieve hard living conditions of Palestinian people in the Gaza Strip and to satisfy their vital needs, Azerbaijan through AIDA agency provided direct financial aid (US$100,000) to the population of the Gaza Strip.

== Development Assistance ==
The main objective of AIDA in development assistance is to provide technical assistance to developing countries around the world and to support their sustainable growth in various fields. According to the OECD, 2020 official development assistance from Azerbaijan decreased by 7% to US$26 million.

=== Electronic Government Project in Afghanistan ===
In close cooperation with UNDP, AIDA assists Afghanistan in building the system of E-government in order to increase efficiency of governmental agencies in this country.

=== Professional development courses and workshops ===
AIDA, together with Azerbaijan's universities, scientific and research institutes arranges capacity-building courses and workshops in various areas for specialists from developing countries to facilitate the growth of human capital in those countries.
