= Higashiōsaka =

Higashiōsaka 東大阪市
- Core city
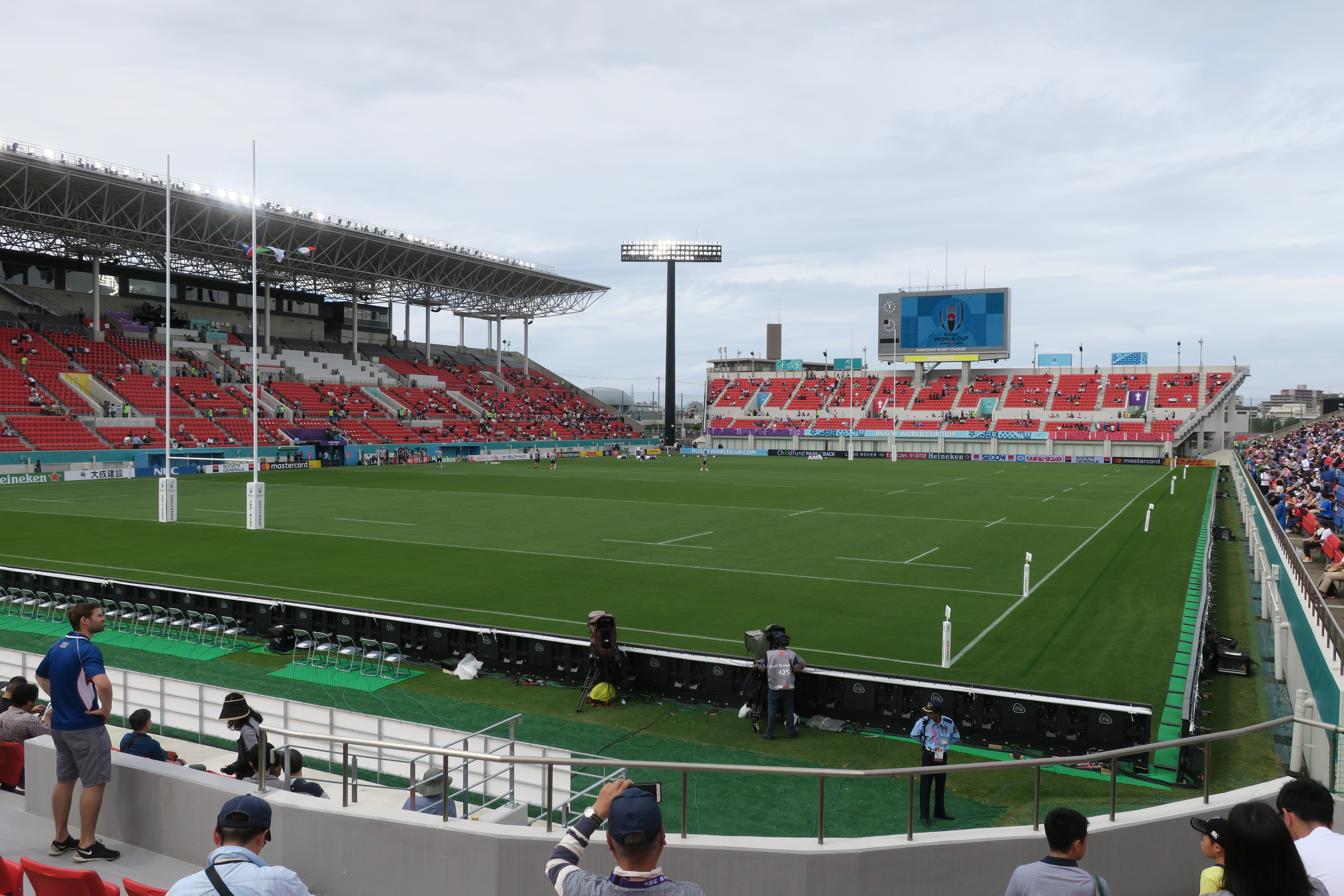
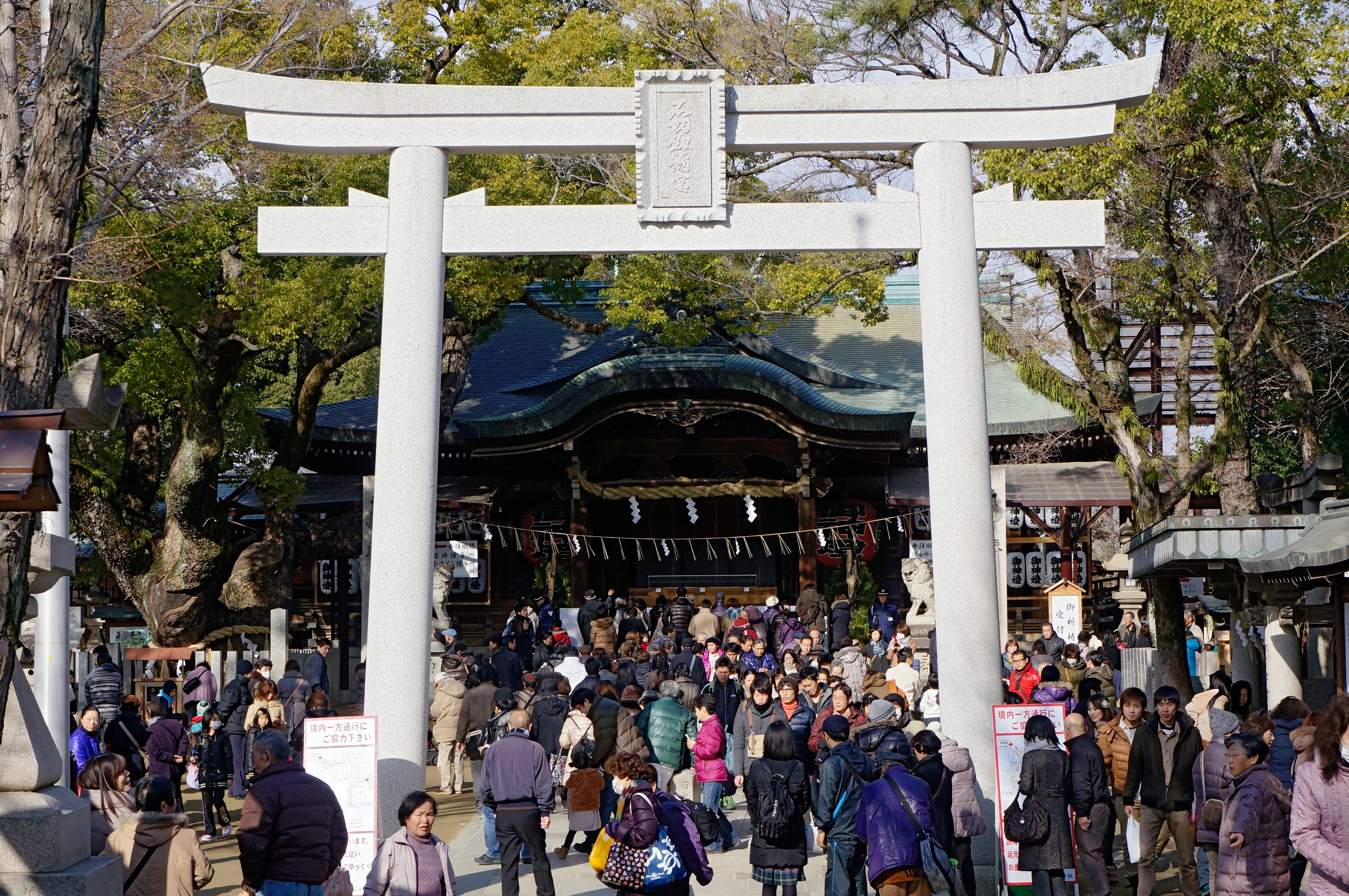
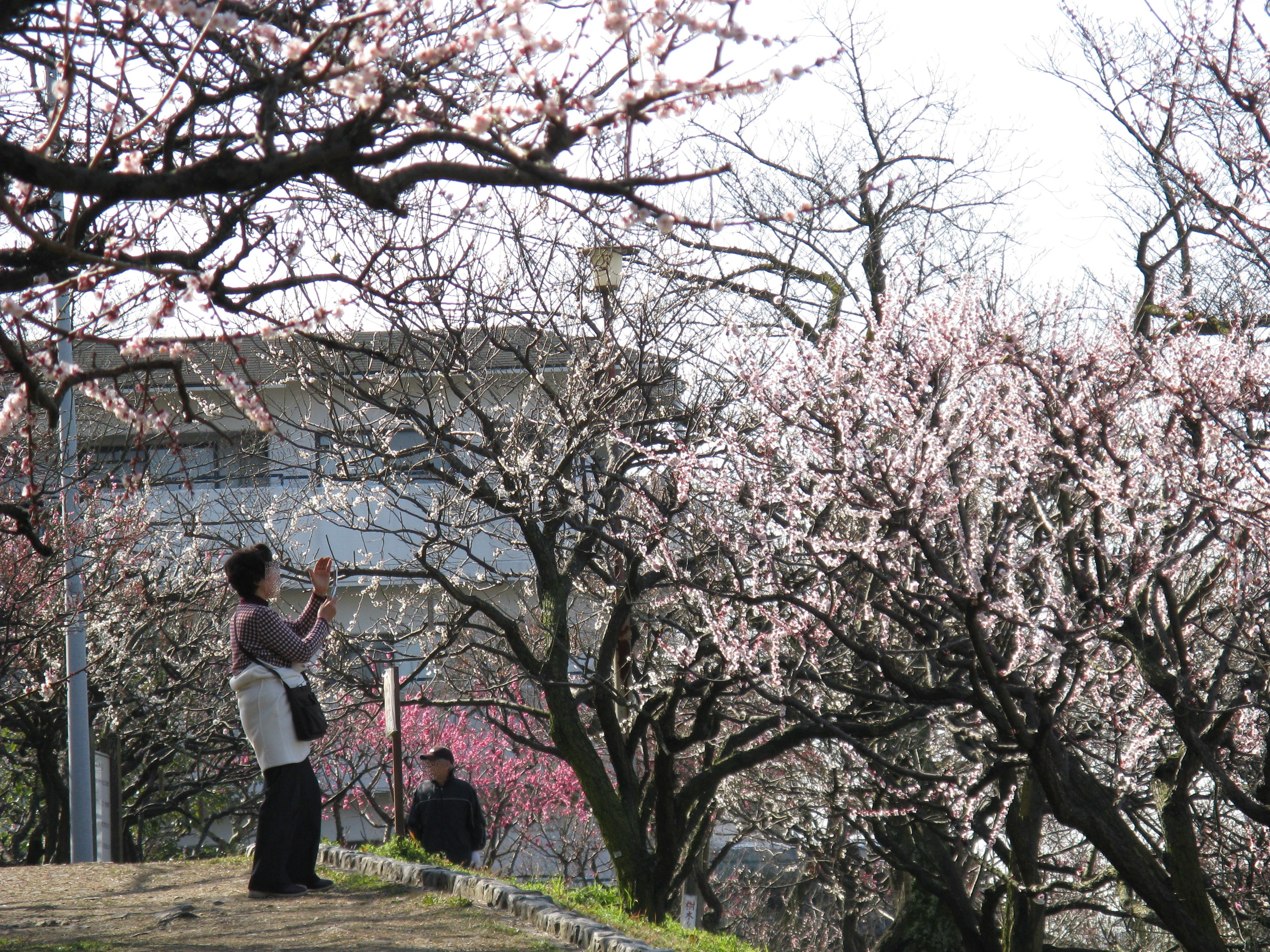
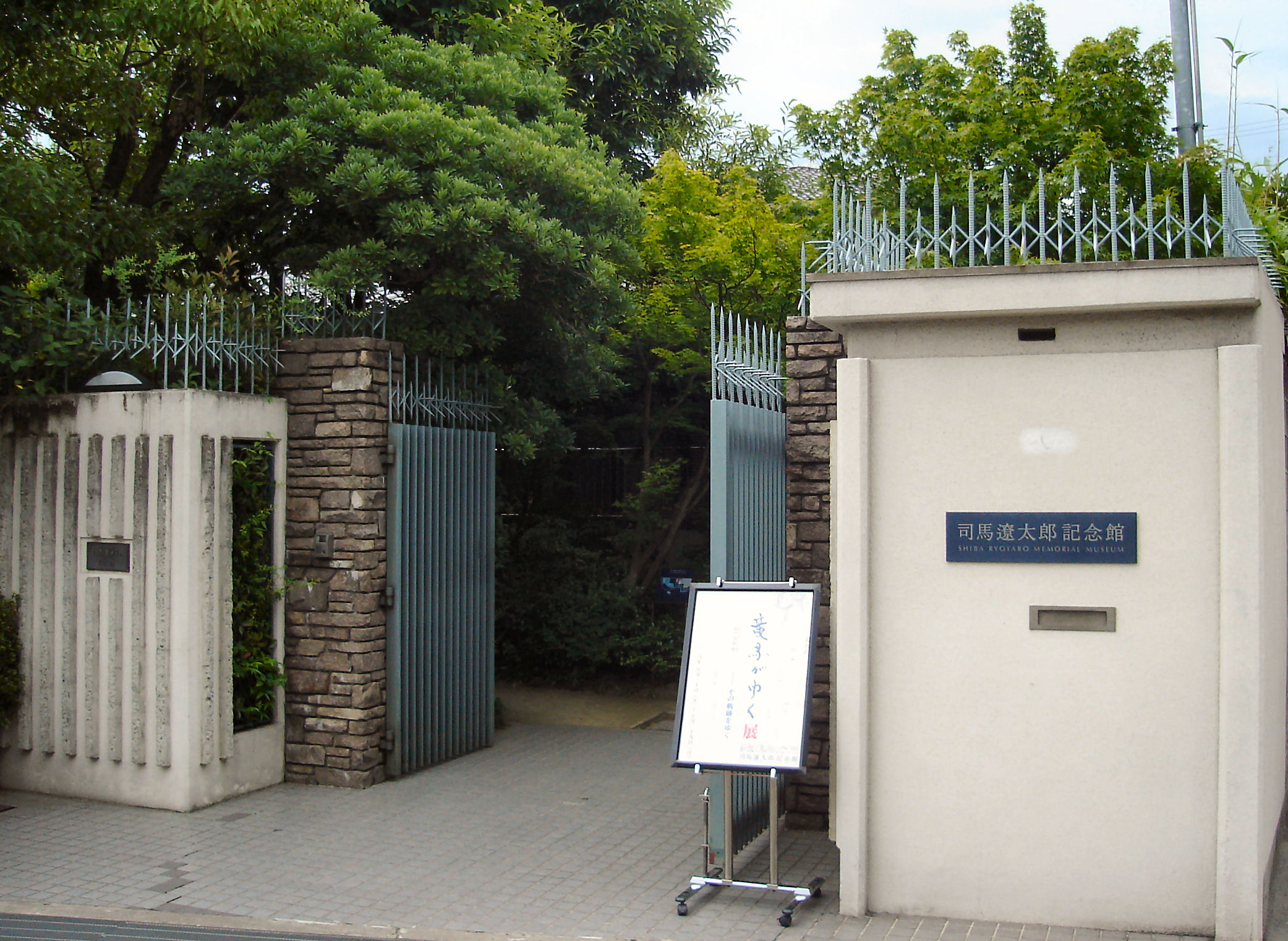
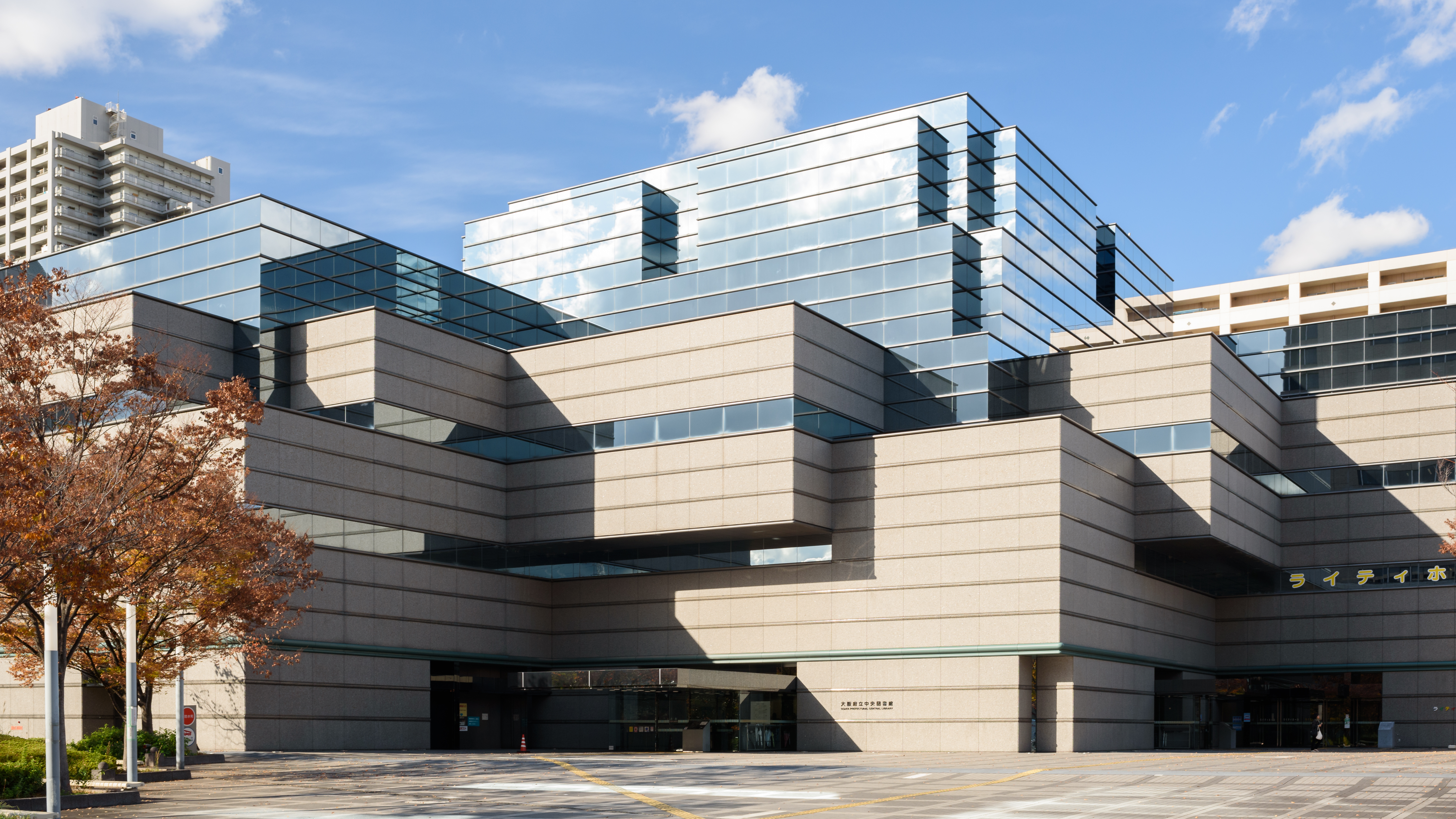
- From top: Hanazono Rugby Stadium, Ishikiritsurugiya-jinja, Hiraoka Park, Shiba Ryotaro Memorial Museum, and Osaka Prefectural Central Library

- Flag Emblem
- Interactive map of Higashiōsaka
- Location in Japan
- Coordinates: 34°40′46″N 135°36′03″E
- Country: Japan
- Region: Kansai
- Prefecture: Osaka

Government
  - Mayor: Junzō Nagao

Area
  - Total: 61.78 km^{2} (23.85 sq mi)

Population (July 1, 2023)
  - Total: 486,464
  - Density: 7,874/km^{2} (20,390/sq mi)
- Time zone: UTC+09:00 (JST)
- City hall address: 50-4 Aramoto-kita, Higashiōsaka-shi, Ōsaka-fu 577-8521
- Website: Official website
- Symbols
- Flower: Ume
- Tree: Camphor laurel

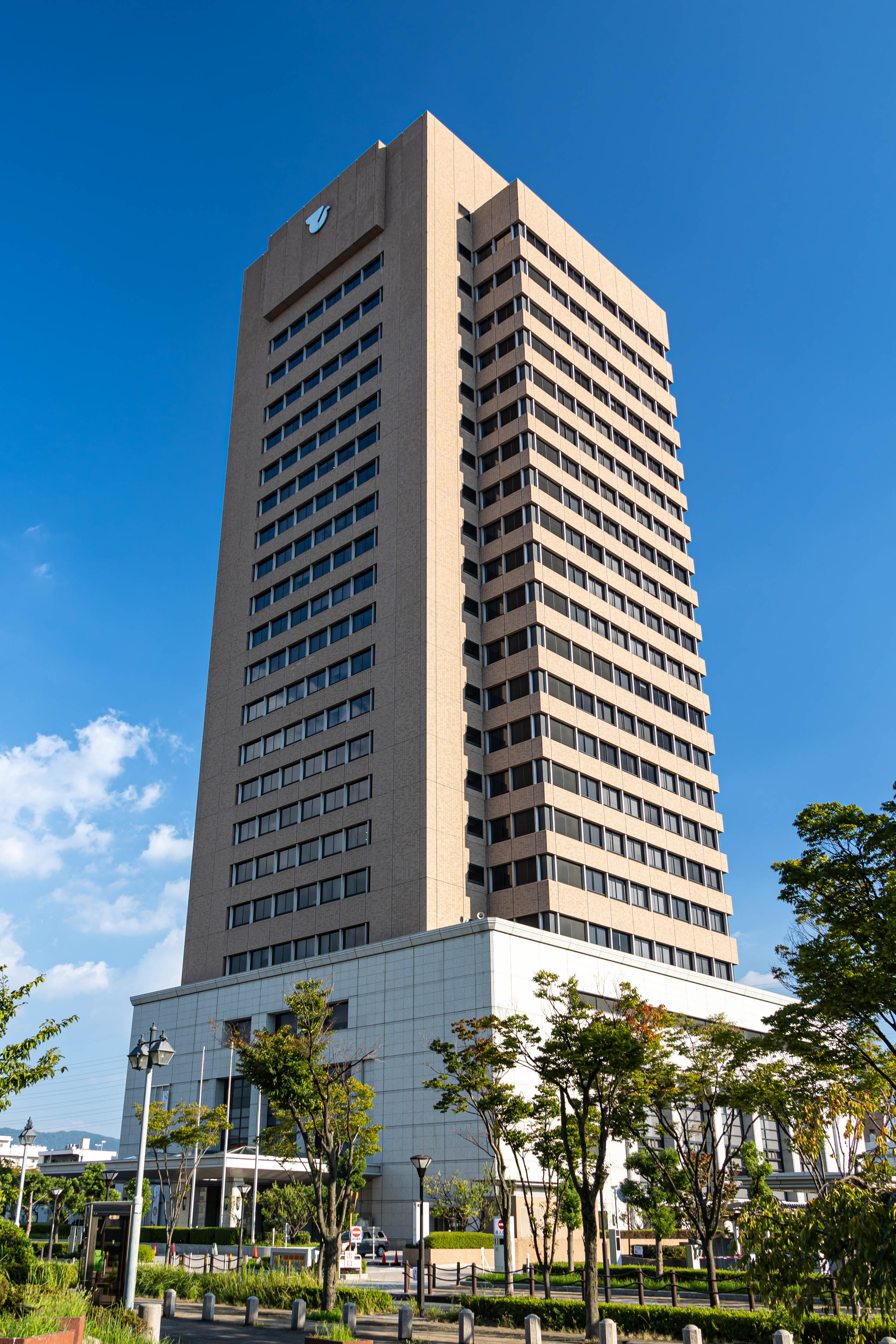
Higashiōsaka City Hall

Higashiōsaka (東大阪市, Higashiōsaka-shi; literally "East Osaka City") is a city located in Osaka Prefecture, Japan. As of 1 July 2023, the city had an estimated population of 486,464 in 233,124 households and a population density of 7,874 persons per km^{2}. The total area of the city is 61.78 square kilometres (23.85 sq mi). The city is known as one of the industrial cities of Japan and "the rugby football town".

== Geography ==
Higashiōsaka is located in the eastern part of the Osaka Plain, bordered by the Osaka metropolis to the west. Most of the city area is flat lowlands laced with rivers and has been subject to periodic flooding. The main rivers include the Nagase River, Onji River, Tamagushi River, and Daini Neya River. The eastern part of the city rises to the Ikoma Mountains, forming the border with Nara Prefecture. The city measures approximately 11.2 kilometers from east-to-west by 7.9 kilometers from north-to-south.

=== Surrounding municipalities ===
- Nara Prefecture
  - Heguri
  - Ikoma
- Osaka Prefecture
  - Daitō
  - Osaka
  - Shijōnawate
  - Yao

== Climate ==
Higashiōsaka has a humid subtropical climate (Köppen Cfa) characterized by warm summers and cool winters with light to no snowfall. The average annual temperature in Higashiōsaka is 15.6 °C. The average annual rainfall is 1475 mm with September as the wettest month. The temperatures are highest on average in August, at around 27.7 °C, and lowest in January, at around 4.2 °C.

== Demographics ==
Per Japanese census data, the population of Higashiōsaka increased rapidly from the 1950s through 1970s, and has leveled off since.

Historical population
Year	Pop.	±%
1950	228,923	—
1960	318,001	+38.9%
1970	500,173	+57.3%
1980	521,558	+4.3%
1990	518,319	−0.6%
2000	515,094	−0.6%
2010	509,632	−1.1%

== History ==
The location of Higashiōsaka corresponds to the central part of Kawachi Province. In ancient times, this area was an extension of Osaka Bay called Kawachi Bay, which gradually became separated from the sea and became a lake. The lake gradually became land due to the accumulation of sediment by the Yamato River. During the Kofun and Asuka periods, this was the homeland of the Mononobe clan, and was on the main road between the Yamato Basin and the port at Naniwa, with sea connections to the Asian continent. During the Heian period, the area was largely controlled by Hiraoka Shrine. From the Muromachi period, it was the base of the Hatakeyama clan to control Kawachi Province, but due to internal conflicts it can under the control of the Miyoshi clan. Later it was the site of battles during the 1615 Siege of Osaka. In the Edo Period, flood control projects on the Yamato River created a large amount of reclaimed land, which was developed by wealthy Osaka merchants for rice and cotton production.

The modern city was founded on February 1, 1967, by a merger of three cities, Fuse (布施), Kawachi (河内) and Hiraoka (枚岡). On April 1, 2005, Higashiōsaka became a Core city with increased local autonomy.

== Government ==
Higashiōsaka has a mayor-council form of government with a directly elected mayor and a unicameral city council of 38 members. Higashiōsaka contributes five members to the Osaka Prefectural Assembly. In terms of national politics, the city is part of Osaka 13th district of the lower house of the Diet of Japan.

=== Elections ===
- 2007 Higashiōsaka city assembly election
- 2006 Higashiōsaka mayoral election
- 2006 Higashiosaka by-election

== Education ==
=== Colleges and universities ===
- Kindai University
- Osaka University of Commerce
- Osaka Shoin Women's University
- Higashiosaka College
- Higashiosaka Junior College

=== High schools ===
Prefectural senior high schools:

- Fuse Kita High School (大阪府立布施北高等学校)
- Fuse Technology High School (大阪府立布施工科高等学校)
- Joto Technology High School (大阪府立城東工科高等学校)
- Kawachino High School (大阪府立かわち野高等学校)
- Midori Seiho Senior High School (大阪府立みどり清朋高等学校)
- Osaka Prefectural Fuse High School (大阪府立布施高等学校)
- Osaka Prefectural Hanazono Senior High School (大阪府立花園高等学校)
- Osaka Prefectural Hiraoka Shofu High School (大阪府立枚岡樟風高等学校)

Municipal senior high schools:

- 東大阪市立日新高等学校

Other senior high schools:

- 近畿大学附属高等学校
- 大阪商業大学高等学校
- 樟蔭高等学校
- 樟蔭東高等学校
- 東大阪大学敬愛高等学校

North Korea-aligned Korean international schools:

- Higashi Osaka Korean Elementary School (東大阪朝鮮初級学校)
- Osaka Korean High School

== Transportation ==
=== Railway ===
JR West – Katamachi Line (Gakkentoshi Line)

- Tokuan - Kōnoikeshinden

JR West – Osaka Higashi Line

- Takaida-Chūō - JR-Kawachi-Eiwa - JR-Shuntokumichi - JR Nagase

Kintetsu Railway - Nara Line

- Fuse - Kawachi-Eiwa - Kawachi-Kosaka - Yaenosato - Wakae-Iwata - Kawachi-Hanazono - Higashi-Hanazono - Hyōtan-yama - Hiraoka - Nukata - Ishikiri

Kintetsu Railway - Osaka Line

- Fuse - Shuntokumichi - Nagase - Mito

Kintetsu Railway - Keihanna Line

- Nagata - Aramoto - Yoshita - Shin-Ishikiri

Osaka Metro - Chūō Line Takaida - Nagata

=== Highways ===
- Expressways
  - Kinki Expressway Higashiosaka-kita Interchange - Higashiosaka Parking Area - Higashiosaka-minami Interchange
  - Daini Hanna Road
  - Hanshin Expressway Higashi-Osaka Route
- Shigi Ikoma Skyline
- National Route 170
- National Route 308

== Sports ==
In association football, the city of Higashiōsaka is represented by FC Osaka.

== Sister cities ==
- Borough of Mitte, Berlin, Germany, since 1959
- Glendale, California, United States

== Local attractions ==
- Hiraoka Shrine
- Higashi Osaka Hanazono Rugby Stadium
- Kusaka Shell Mound
- Kōnoike Shinden Kaisho ruins
