= Takefumi Aida =

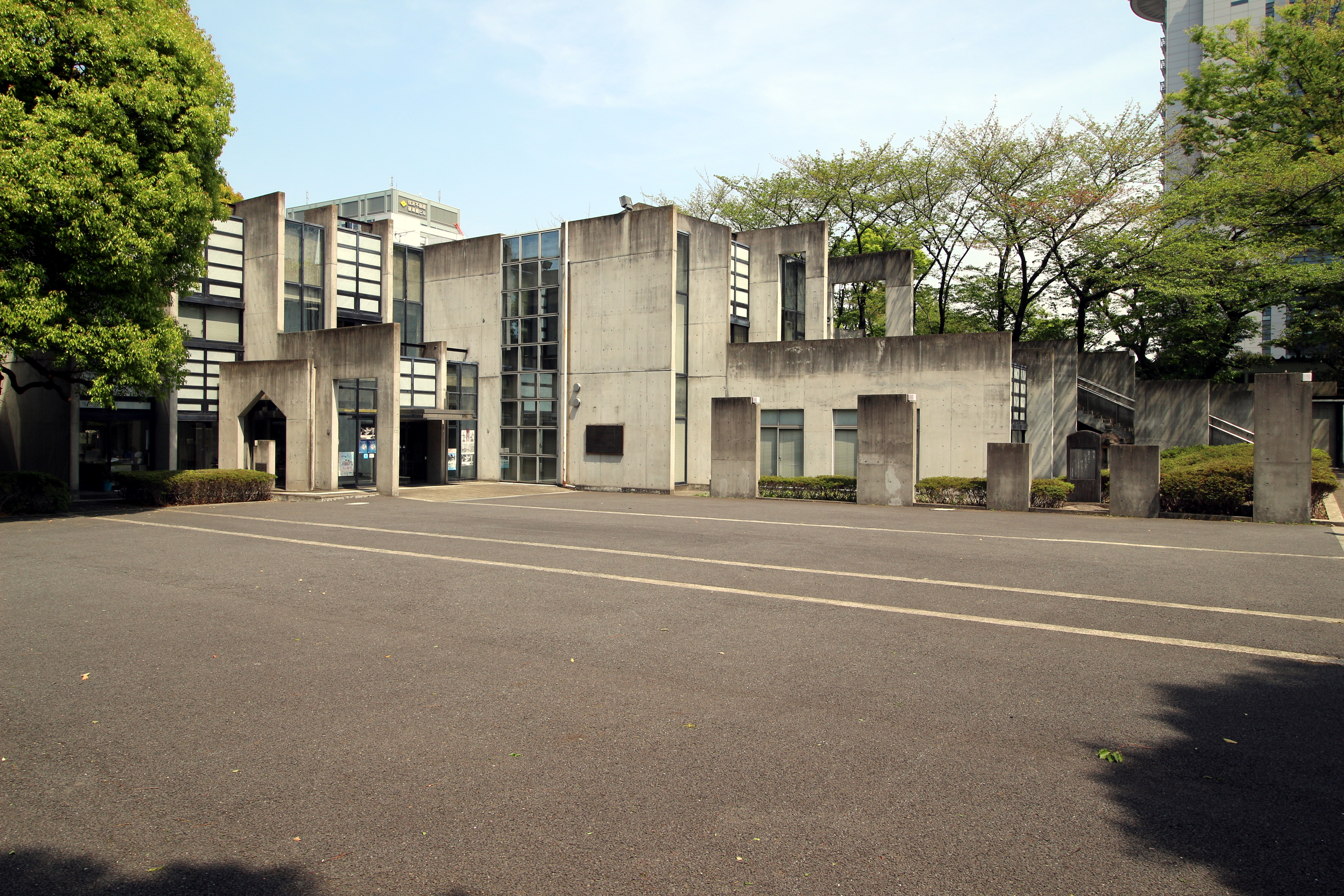
Tokyo War Dead Memorial Park

Takefumi Aida (相田武文) (Aida Takefumi) (born June 5, 1937) is a Japanese architect. He is known for his building block house series and layered memorials, which represented a break from then-current Japanese Metabolist philosophies.

== Career ==
In 1960 Aida graduated from Waseda University. In 1962, he completed the master's course at Waseda University. In 1966, he completed a doctoral course at Waseda University Graduate School. In 1967, he established the Takefumi Aida Architectural Institute. In 1977, he became a professor at Shibaura Institute of Technology and changed the name to Takefumi Aida Design Laboratory. In 2013, he reorganized into Aida Doi Design Co., Ltd. He is an honorary member of the Japan Institute of Architects.

== Influence and philosophy ==
Aida was a founding member of ArchiteXt, a group of architects formed in 1971 that disputed modern architecture's guiding relationships between form and function, specifically opposing the Japanese Metabolist movement. Aida explored form with his Toy Block Houses in Yokyo and Hofu, and moved do explorations of layered spaces in later work. These later works were described by Aida as "architecture of fluctuation."

The Takefumi Aida Memorial Award is a university award of Shibaura Institute of Technology.

== Works ==
- An Artist's House (1967)
- Nirvana House (1972)
- Annihilation House (1972)
- PL Institute Kindergarten (1973)
- Duanxiang Stepped-Platform House (1975)
- House Like a Die (1973)
- Building Blocks/Toy Block House I (1979)
- GA HOUSE14 (1983) First round Japan Association of Architects Newcomer Award (1982)
- Building Block House II/Toy Block House II (1979)
- Building Blocks III/Toy Block House III (1981), GA HOUSE14 (1983)
- Building Block House V Toy Block House V (1981)
- Toy Block House VI Toy Block House VI (1981)
- Building Blocks House VII/Toy Block House VII (1983)
- Building Block House VIII/Toy Block House VIII (1984)
- Toy Block House IX /Toy Block House IX (1983), International Design Competition 2nd Prize
- Building Blocks Home X/Toy Block House X (1984)
- The Memorial at Iwo Jima Island (1983)
- Kazama House (1987)
- Tokyo War Dead Memorial Park (1988)
- Shibaura Institute of Technology, Saito Memorial Hall (1990)
- Community Center of Kawasato Village (1993)
- Mizuho Funeral Hall (1988)
- Ruriyama Manganji Temple, Jorenin Temple, Main Hall, Guest Hall, Curry Manganji Temple, Jourenin (2011)

== Bibliography ==
- Architectural Morphological Theory, Mingxian Society
- Architecture・NOTE Takefumi Aida: House of Building Blocks, Maruzen
- Modern Architecture/Space and Method 1・Aida Takefumi, published by Dopōsha
- Building blocks の 家 X 発想からCompleteまで, Maruzen
- Takefumi Aida Buildings and Projects, Princeton Architectural Press
- SD Selected Book 228 Genealogy of Urban Design Co-authored by Takefumi Aida and Kazuo Tsuchiya, Kashima Press
- Architectural Works Collection of Takefumi Aida, Xinjianshe
- Thinking of Drifting Aida Takefumi's Architectural Essays, Xinjianshe
- Architect のひとこと, New Construction Company
