= Clearwater Lake =

Clearwater Lake or Lake Clearwater may refer to:

== Lakes ==
=== Canada ===
- Clearwater Lake (British Columbia)
- Clearwater Lake (Manitoba)
- Clearwater Lake (Ontario)
- Clearwater Lake (Saskatchewan)
- Clearwater Lakes, the English name of the Lac à l'Eau Claire, a pair of impact craters in northern Québec

=== United States ===
- Clearwater Lake Recreation Area, a lake and surrounding area in Ocala National Forest, Florida
- Clearwater Lake (Cook County, Minnesota)
- Clearwater Lake (Missouri), on the border of Reynolds and Wayne Counties, formed by the Clearwater Dam
- Clearwater Lake (Wisconsin), in Oneida County

=== Other countries ===
- Lake Clearwater, in Canterbury Region, New Zealand
- Clear Lake (Palau) or Clearwater Lake

== Settlements ==
- Lake Clearwater (village), in Canterbury Region, New Zealand
- Clearwater Lake, Wisconsin, US

== See also ==
- Clearwater (disambiguation)
