= Clearwater River =

Clearwater River may refer to:

== Rivers ==
=== Canada ===
- Clearwater River (Alberta), a tributary of the North Saskatchewan River in west-central Alberta
- Clearwater River (British Columbia), a tributary of the Thompson River in British Columbia
- Clearwater River (Saskatchewan), a tributary of the Athabasca River in northwestern Saskatchewan and northeastern Alberta
- Clearwater River (Quebec), in northern Quebec, known also as Rivière à l'Eau Claire in French
- Clearwater River was the original name given to the Chutine River

=== New Zealand ===
- Clearwater River (New Zealand), in the South Island of New Zealand

=== United States ===
- Clearwater River (Idaho) in Idaho
- Clearwater River (Mississippi River tributary) in central Minnesota
- Clearwater River (Red Lake River) in northwestern Minnesota
- Clearwater River (Oregon) in Oregon
- Clearwater River (Queets River) in Washington
- Clearwater River (White River) in the Clearwater Wilderness of Washington

== Other uses ==
- Clearwater river (river type), a classification of rivers, used in contrast to white and blackwater rivers
- Clearwater River Dene Nation, a First Nations group in Saskatchewan
- Clearwater River Provincial Park, Saskatchewan
- Clearwater National Forest, along the Clearwater River in Idaho

== See also ==
- Clearwater (disambiguation)
- Qingshui (disambiguation), the same name in Chinese
- Shimizu (disambiguation), the same name in Japanese
