= 清水區 =

清水區 or 清水区, meaning "district of clean water", may refer to:

- Shimizu-ku, Shizuoka, Shizuoka Prefecture, Japan
- Qingshui District, Taichung, Taiwan

== See also ==
- Shimizu (disambiguation)
- Qingshui (disambiguation)
- 清水 (disambiguation)
