= Simiza =

Simiza may refer to:

- Simiza people, or Chimila, an ethnic group of Colombia
- Simiza language, or Chimila, a language of Colombia
- Simiza, Greece, a community in Tragano, Greece

== See also ==
- Simizu (disambiguation)
