= Qingshui River (Taiwan) =

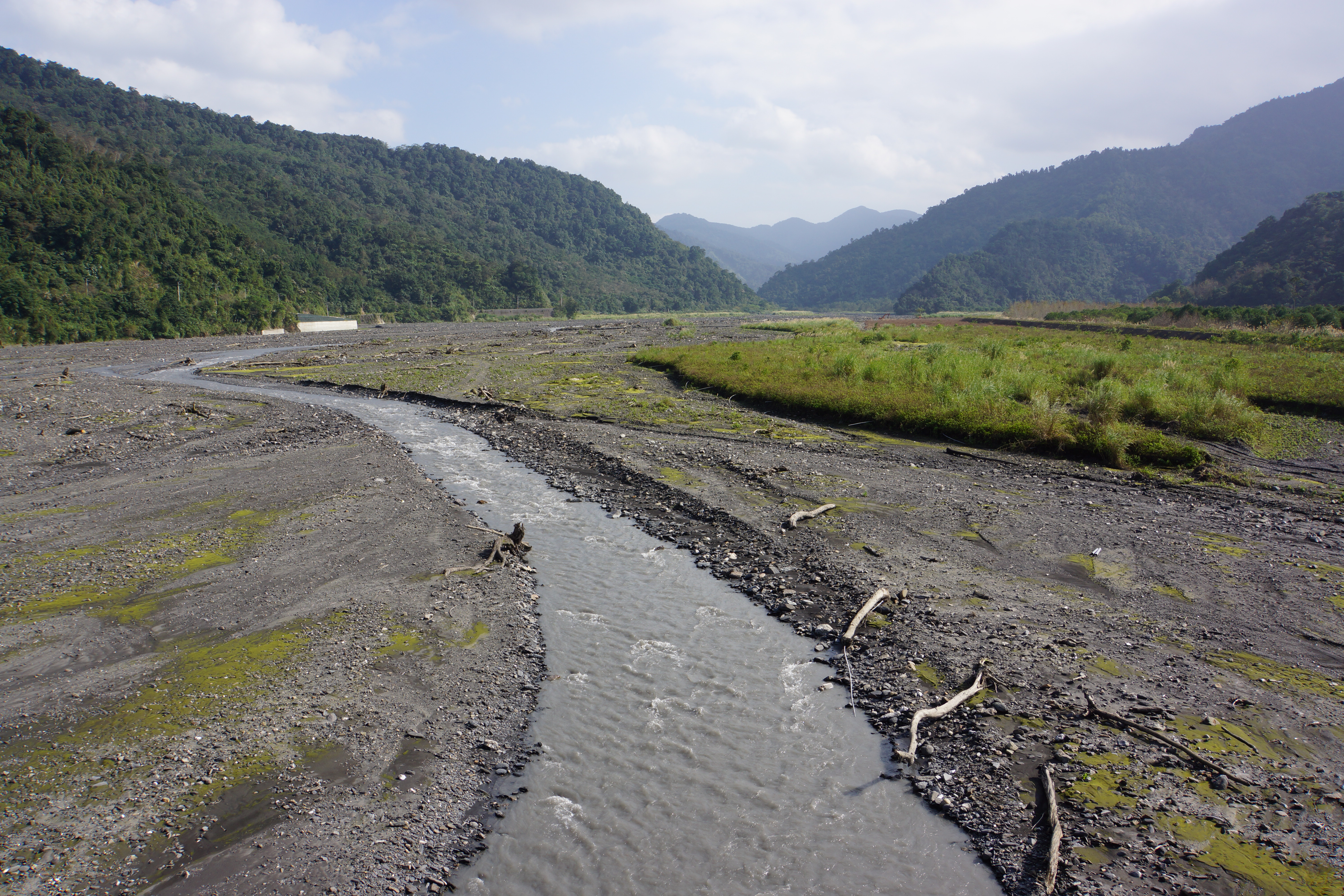

- Map showing the mouth of Qingshui River at its confluence with the Lanyang River

Location
- Country: Yilan County, Taiwan

Physical characteristics
- Mouth
  - location: Sanxing
  - coordinates: 24.6491°N 121.5979°E
- Length: 25 km (16 mi)

Basin features
- River system: Lanyang River
- Tributaries
  - left: Da River (Daxi)

Qingshui River
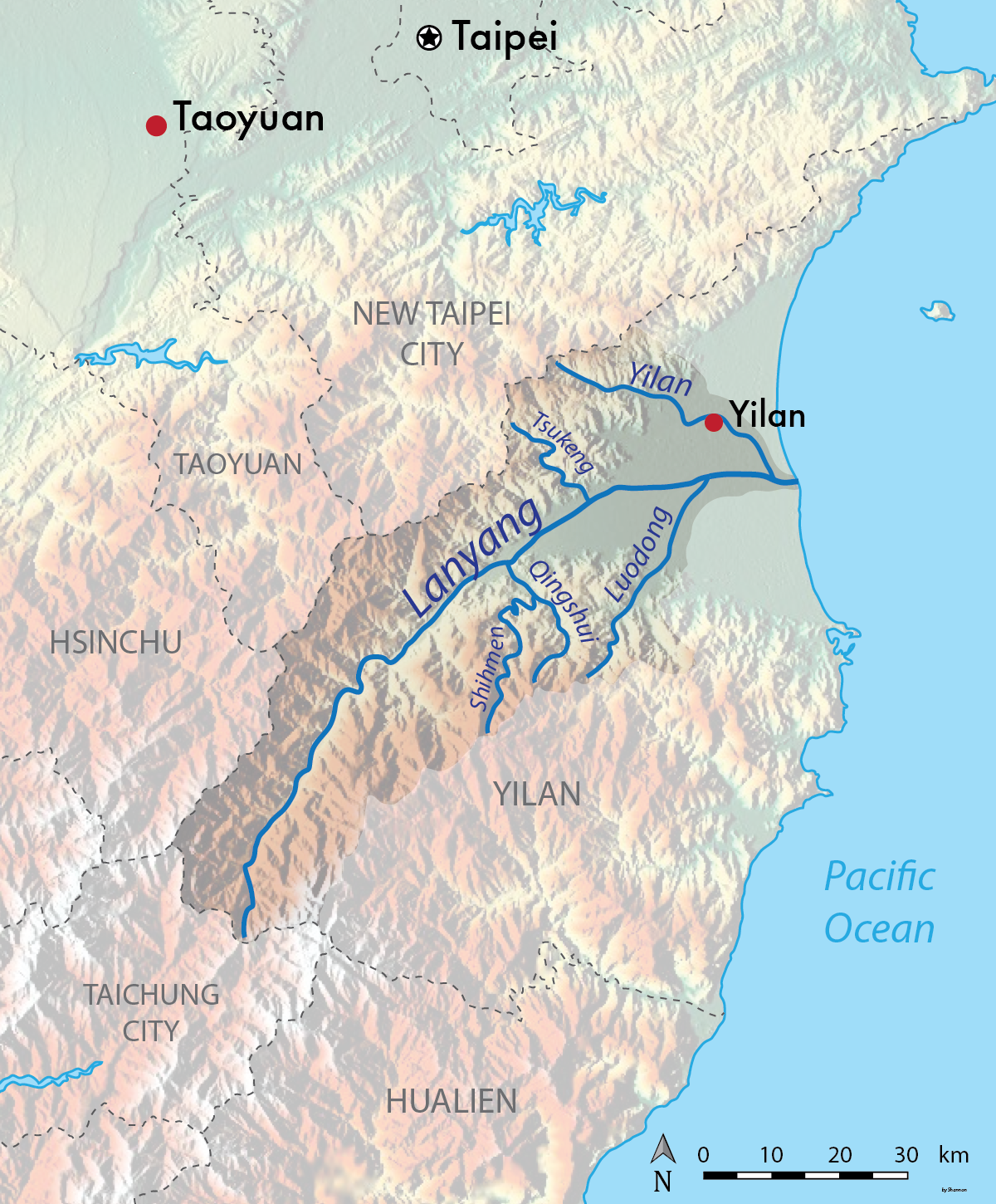
- The Lanyang Basin
- Chinese: 清水溪
- Literal meaning: Clearwater Creek
Transcriptions
Standard Mandarin
- Hanyu Pinyin: Qīngshuǐxī
- Wade–Giles: Ch‘ing-shui Hsi
Southern Min
- Hokkien POJ: Chheng-chúi-khoe

The Qingshui River or Creek is a tributary of the Lanyang River on Taiwan. It flows through Yilan County for 25 km.

Hot springs are found along the Qingshui River.

== See also ==
- List of rivers in Taiwan
- Other Qingshuis in China and on Taiwan
