= Clearwater River (New Zealand) =

River in the West Coast, New Zealand

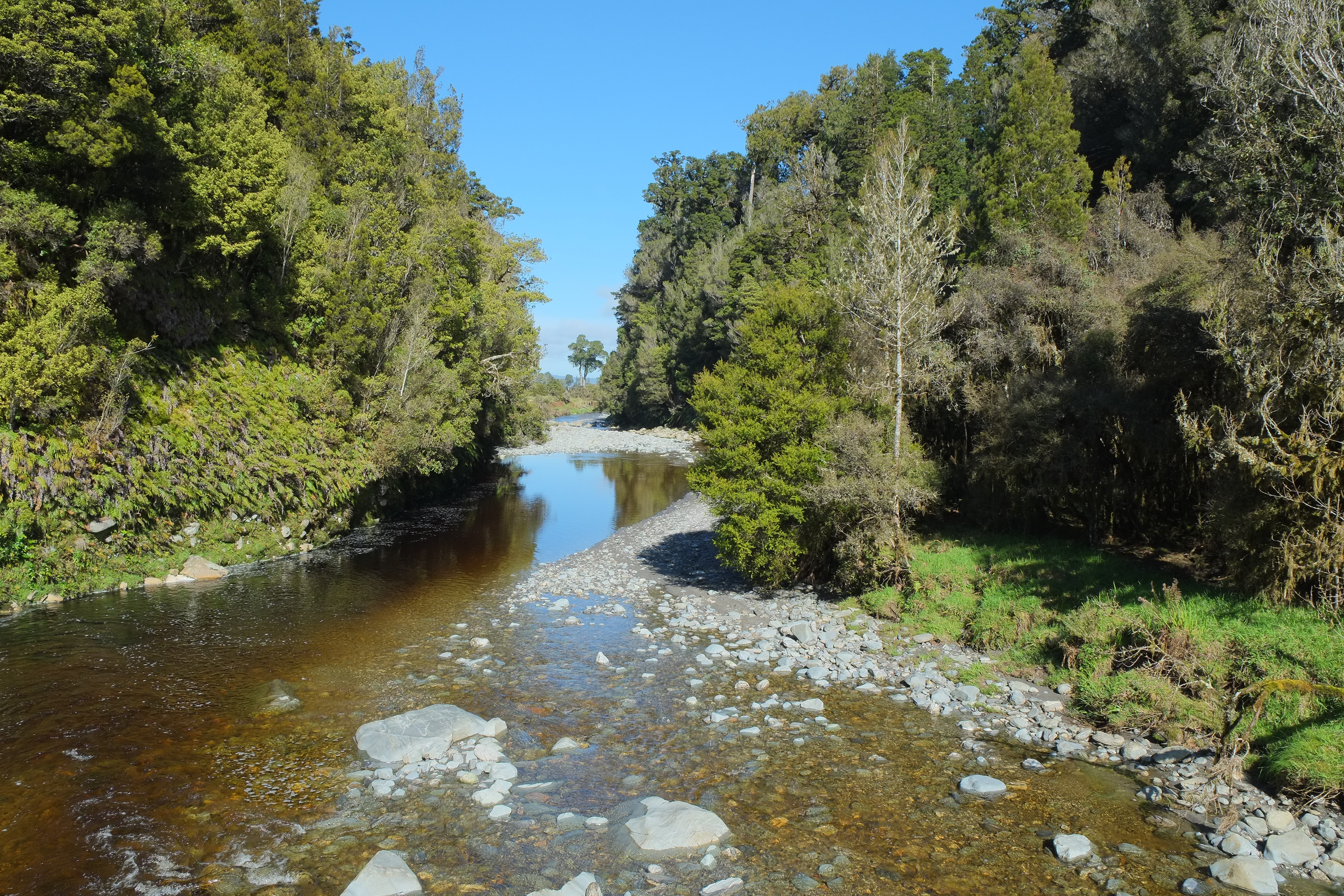
- Clearwater River near Lake Matheson
- Route of the Clearwater River
- Mouth of the Clearwater River Clearwater River (New Zealand) (New Zealand)
- Native name: Kairaumati

Location
- Country: New Zealand
- Region: West Coast
- District: Westland

Physical characteristics
- Source: Mount Mitchell
  - location: Western end of Victoria Range
  - coordinates: 43.47888°S 170.07972°E
  - elevation: 1,600 m (5,200 ft)
- Mouth: Cook River / Weheka
  - location: 11 kilometres (7 mi) west of Fox Glacier township
  - coordinates: 43°27′10″S 169°52′44″E
  - elevation: 45 m (148 ft)
- Length: 20 kilometres (12 mi)

Basin features
- Progression: Clearwater River → Cook River / Weheka → Tasman Sea
- River system: Cook River / Weheka
- Tributaries
  - left: Rocky Creek, Carters Creek
  - right: Lyttles Creek, Souter Creek

The Clearwater River (Māori: Kairaumati) is on the West Coast of the South Island of New Zealand. The river originates on the northern slopes of Mount Mitchell on the western end of the Victoria Range, only one valley north of the Fox Glacier and Fox River. Clearwater River and its tributary creeks drain land to the north of the Cook River / Weheka. The river flows under a bridge of SH 6 just north of the Fox Glacier township and passes close to Lake Matheson shortly after before flowing into Cook River / Weheka, which drains into the Tasman Sea.

== See also ==
- List of rivers of New Zealand
