= 清水 =

清水 or 淸水, meaning "clear" or "pure water", may refer to:

- Qingshui (disambiguation), the Chinese transliteration
- Shimizu (disambiguation), the Japanese transliteration
