= Clearwater =

Clearwater or Clear Water may refer to:

== Places ==
=== Canada ===
- Clear Water Academy, a private Catholic school located in Calgary, Alberta
- Clearwater (provincial electoral district), a former provincial electoral district in Alberta
- Clearwater, British Columbia
- Clearwater, Manitoba
- Clearwater County, Alberta
- Clearwater Lakes, a double impact crater in Quebec

=== Hong Kong ===
- Clear Water Bay

=== United States ===
- Clearwater, Florida
- Clearwater, Kansas
- Clearwater, Minnesota
- Clearwater, Missouri
- Clearwater, Nebraska
- Clearwater, Oregon
- Clearwater, South Carolina
- Clearwater, Washington
- Clearwater County, Idaho
- Clearwater County, Minnesota
- Clearwater Township, Michigan
- Clearwater Township, Minnesota
- Clearwater Township, Nebraska
- Clearwater Mountains, in the panhandle of Idaho

== Other ==
- Clearwater Bay Golf & Country Club, a country club in Hong Kong
- Clearwater Features, a production company which did Thomas the Tank Engine & Friends in its very early years
- Clearwater Festival, a folk music festival whose proceeds benefit Hudson River Sloop Clearwater
- Hudson River Sloop Clearwater, the sloop which this Hudson River non-profit corporation is named after
- Clearwater Marine Aquarium, a 501(c)(3) non-profit organization and aquarium in Clearwater, Florida
- Clearwater Paper Corporation, a pulp and paperboard manufacturer
- Clearwater Threshers, a minor-league baseball team affiliated with the Philadelphia Phillies
- Creedence Clearwater Revival, an American rock band from the late 1960s
- The Clearwater Concert, a 2009 benefit concert at Madison Square Garden in New York City in celebration of Pete Seeger's 90th birthday
- The Clearwater Resort, a golf course in New Zealand

== People with the surname ==
- Alphonso T. Clearwater (1848–1933), American lawyer and judge
- William H. Clearwater (1875–1948), billiards champion

== See also ==
- Clearwater Lake (disambiguation)
- Clearwater River (disambiguation)
- Eau Claire (disambiguation), French for Clearwater
- Shimizu (disambiguation), Japanese for Clearwater
- Qingshui (disambiguation), Chinese for Clearwater
