= Sekime Station =

Railway station in Osaka, Japan

Coordinates: 34°42′44.99″N 135°32′48.48″E

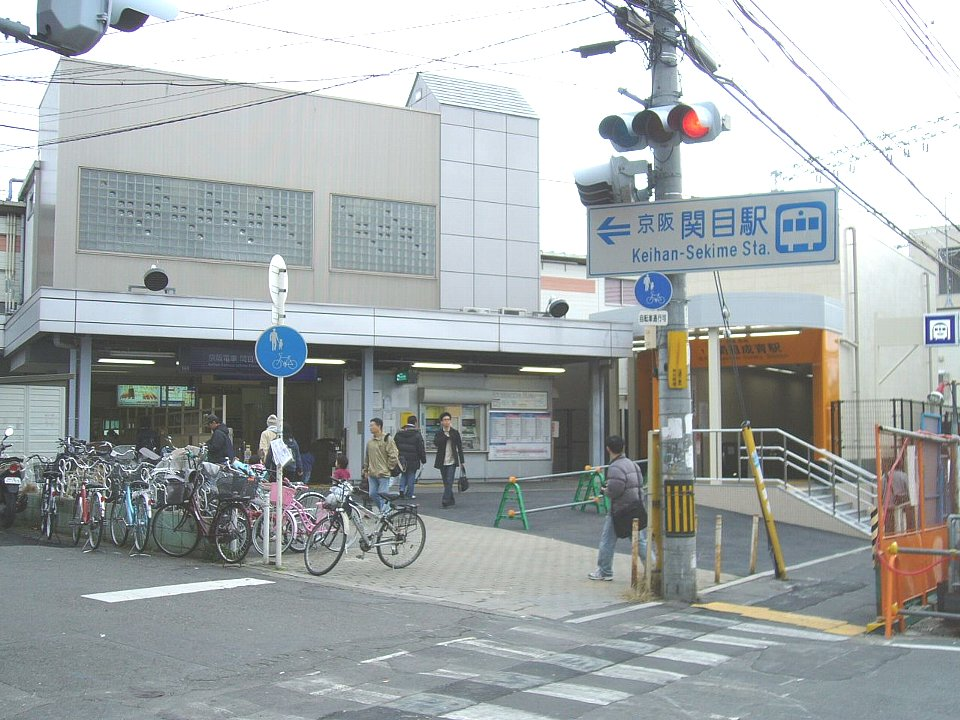
Sekime Station

Sekime Station (関目駅, Sekime-eki) is a train station on the Keihan Electric Railway Keihan Main Line in Sekime Gochome, Joto-ku, Osaka, Japan.

== Lines ==
- Keihan Electric Railway Keihan Main Line
- Osaka Metro Imazatosuji Line (Sekime-Seiiku Station)

== Layout ==
- 2 side platforms serving a track each are located on the 2nd level, outside of 2 inner tracks.

1	■ Keihan Line	for Moriguchishi, Hirakatashi, Sanjo and Demachiyanagi
2	■ Keihan Line	for Kyobashi, Yodoyabashi and Nakanoshima

== Adjacent stations ==
«	Service	»
Keihan Main Line
Noe	Local	Morishōji
Others: Does not stop at this station
