= Shimmori-Furuichi Station =

Metro station in Osaka, Japan

Coordinates: 34.7152°N 135.5580°E

Shimmori-Furuichi Station 新森古市駅
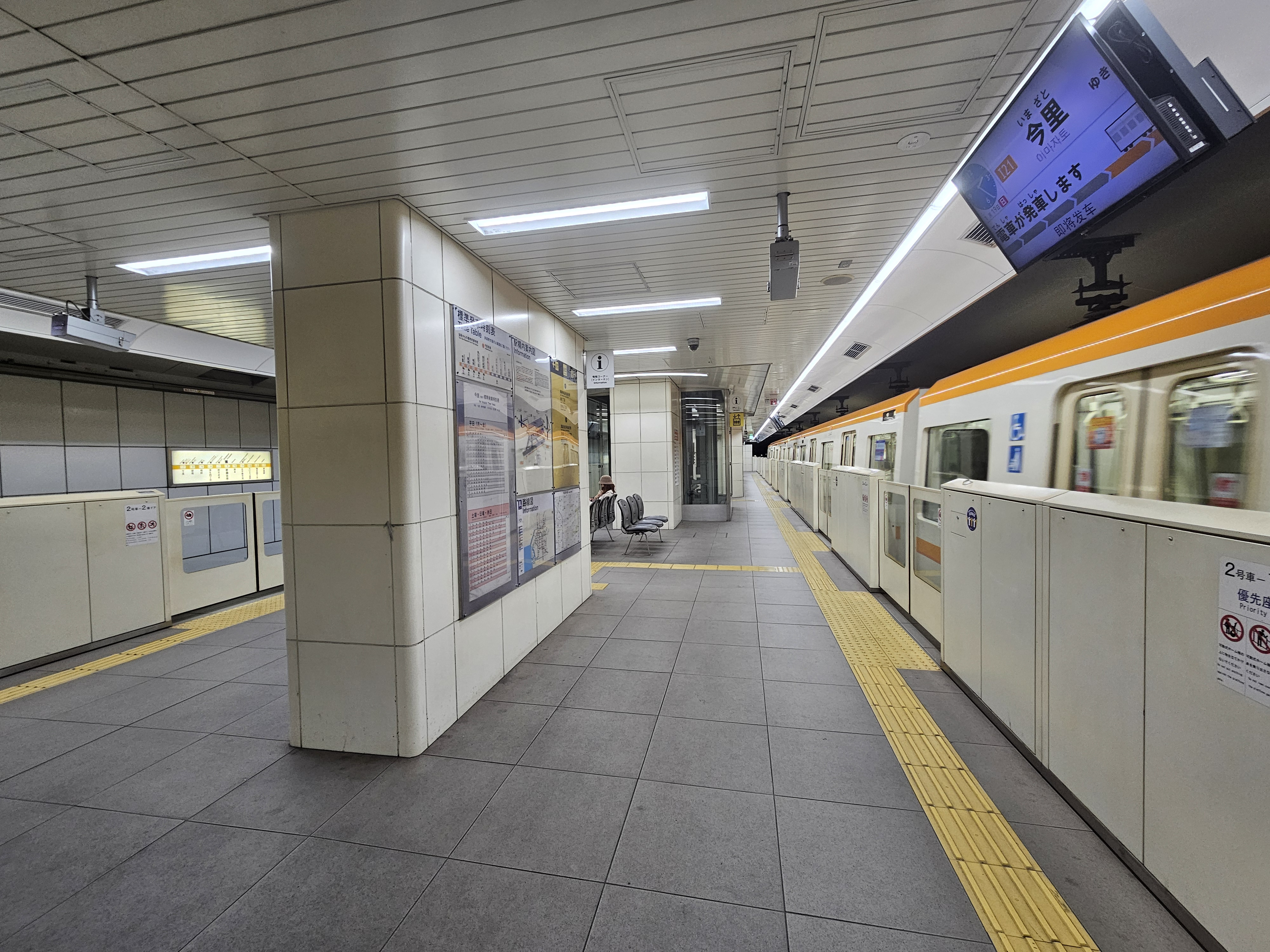
- Station platform

General information
- Location: Asahi, Osaka, Osaka; Japan
- System: Osaka Metro
- Operator: Osaka Metro
- Line: Imazatosuji Line
- Platforms: 1 island platform
- Tracks: 2

Construction
- Structure type: Underground

Other information
- Station code: I 16

History
- Opened: 24 December 2006; 19 years ago

Services
Preceding station	Osaka Metro	Following station
Shimizu I 15 towards Itakano	Imazatosuji Line	Sekime-Seiiku I 17 towards Imazato
Location
- Location within Osaka Prefecture Location within Japan

Shimmori-Furuichi Station (新森古市駅, Shinmori-Furuichi-eki) is a train station on the Osaka Metro Imazatosuji Line in Asahi-ku, Osaka, Japan.

== Lines ==
- Osaka Metro Imazatosuji Line (Station Number: I16)

== Layout ==
The station has one island platform serving two tracks; automatic platform gates are present on the platform.

1	■ Imazatosuji Line	for Gamo-yonchome, Midoribashi and Imazato
2	■ Imazatosuji Line	for Taishibashi-Imaichi and Itakano
