= Clearwater Lake, Wisconsin =

- Unincorporated community
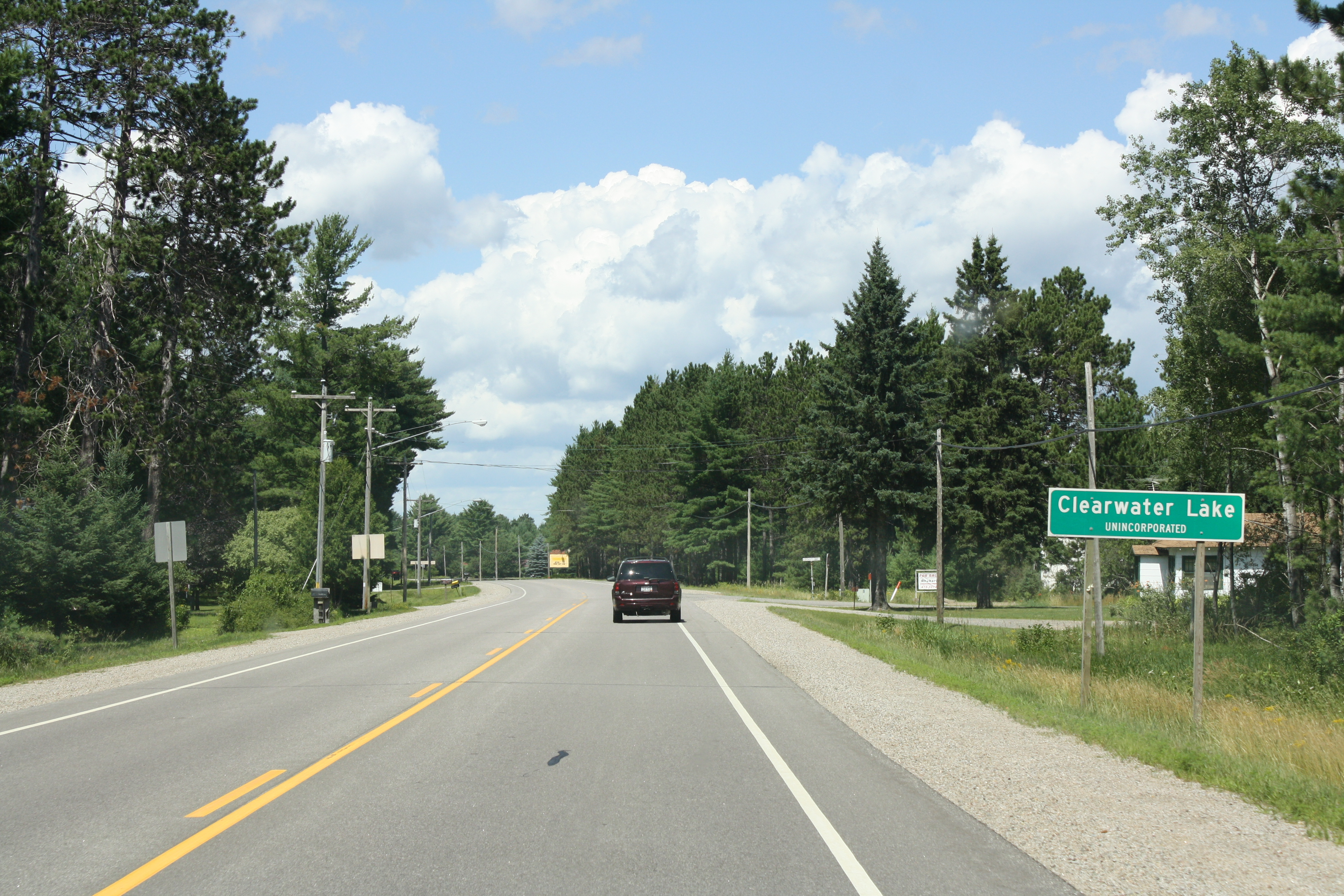
- Looking north at the sign for Clearwater Lake

- Location within Wisconsin Location within the United States
- Coordinates: 45°51′13″N 89°11′17″W
- Country: United States
- State: Wisconsin
- County: Oneida
- Elevation: 1,640 ft (500 m)
- Time zone: UTC-6 (Central (CST))
  - Summer (DST): UTC-5 (CDT)
- Area codes: 715 & 534
- GNIS feature ID: 1563171

Clearwater Lake is an unincorporated community located in the town of Three Lakes, Oneida County, Wisconsin, United States. Clearwater Lake is located midway between Eagle River and Three Lakes, near the eastern shore of Clearwater Lake along U.S. Route 45 and Wisconsin Highway 32, 5.5 miles (8.9 km) southeast of Eagle River.
