= Sekime-Seiiku Station =

Metro station in Osaka, Japan

Coordinates: 34°42′45.94″N 135°32′47.27″E

Sekime-Seiiku 関目成育
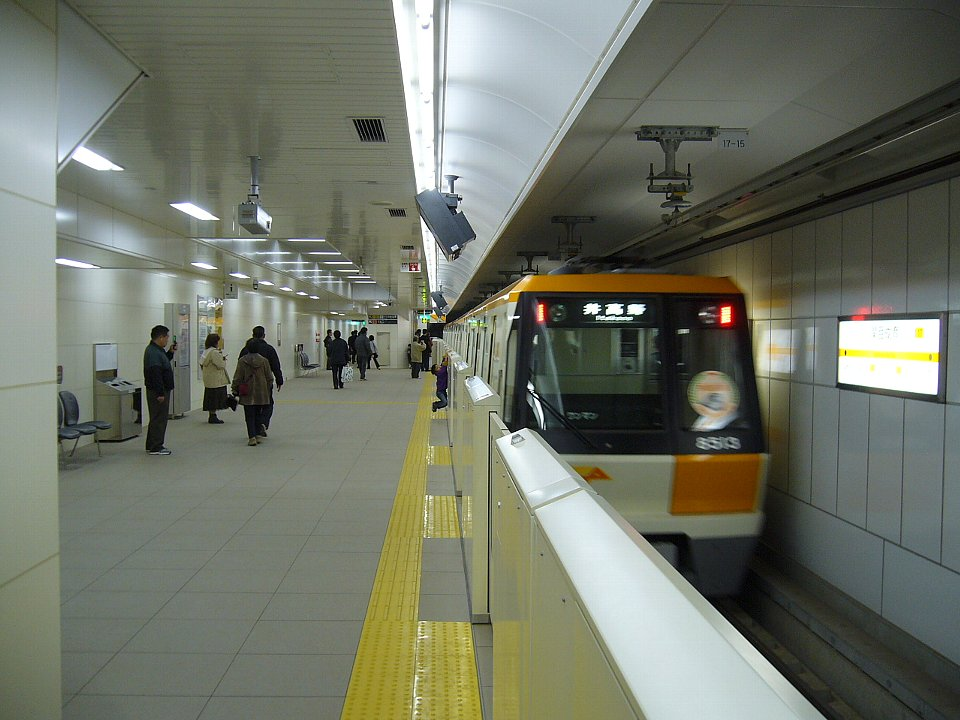

General information
- Location: Sekime Gochome, Joto-ku, Osaka, Osaka Prefecture; Japan
- System: Osaka Metro
- Operator: Osaka Metro
- Line: Imazatosuji Line
- Distance: 7.1 km (4.4 mi) from Itakano Station
- Platforms: 2 split side platforms
- Tracks: 2
- Connections: Keihan Main Line (Sekime Station); Tanimachi Line (Sekime-Takadono Station)

Construction
- Structure type: Underground
- Parking: 7 spaces
- Cycle facilities: none
- Accessible: 1 space

Other information
- Station code: I 17
- Fare zone: none

History
- Opened: 24 December 2006; 19 years ago

Passengers
- 2020: 5,431

Services
Preceding station	Osaka Metro	Following station
Shimmori-Furuichi I 16 towards Itakano	Imazatosuji Line	Gamō Yonchōme I 18 towards Imazato
Location
- Location within Osaka Prefecture Location within Japan

Sekime-Seiiku Station (関目成育駅, Sekime-Seiiku-eki) is a train station on the Osaka Metro Imazatosuji Line in Sekime Gochome, Joto-ku, Osaka, Japan.

While situated relatively close to Sekime-Takadono on the Tanimachi Line, there are no free transfers between the two stations.

== Lines ==
- Osaka Metro Imazatosuji Line (Station Number: I17)
- Keihan Electric Railway Keihan Main Line (Sekime Station)

== Layout ==
- This station has 2 split platforms serving a track each. Each platform is fenced with platform gates.

G	Street level	Exit/Entrance, connection to Keihan Main Line at Sekime (Elevators to lower mezzanine)
B1F	Mezzanine	Faregates, station agent, ticket/ICOCA/PiTaPa machines, restrooms Staircases, elevators, and escalators to platforms
B2F; Upper platform	Platform 1	Imazatosuji Line towards Imazato (Gamo 4-chome) →
B2F; Upper platform	Side platform, doors will open on the right
B3F; Lower platform	Platform 2	← Imazatosuji Line towards Itakano (Shimmori-Furuichi)
B3F; Lower platform	Side platform, doors will open on the left

1	■ Imazatosuji Line	for Gamo 4-chome, Midoribashi and Imazato
2	■ Imazatosuji Line	for Taishibashi-Imaichi and Itakano
