= Cook River / Weheka =

River in the South Island of New Zealand

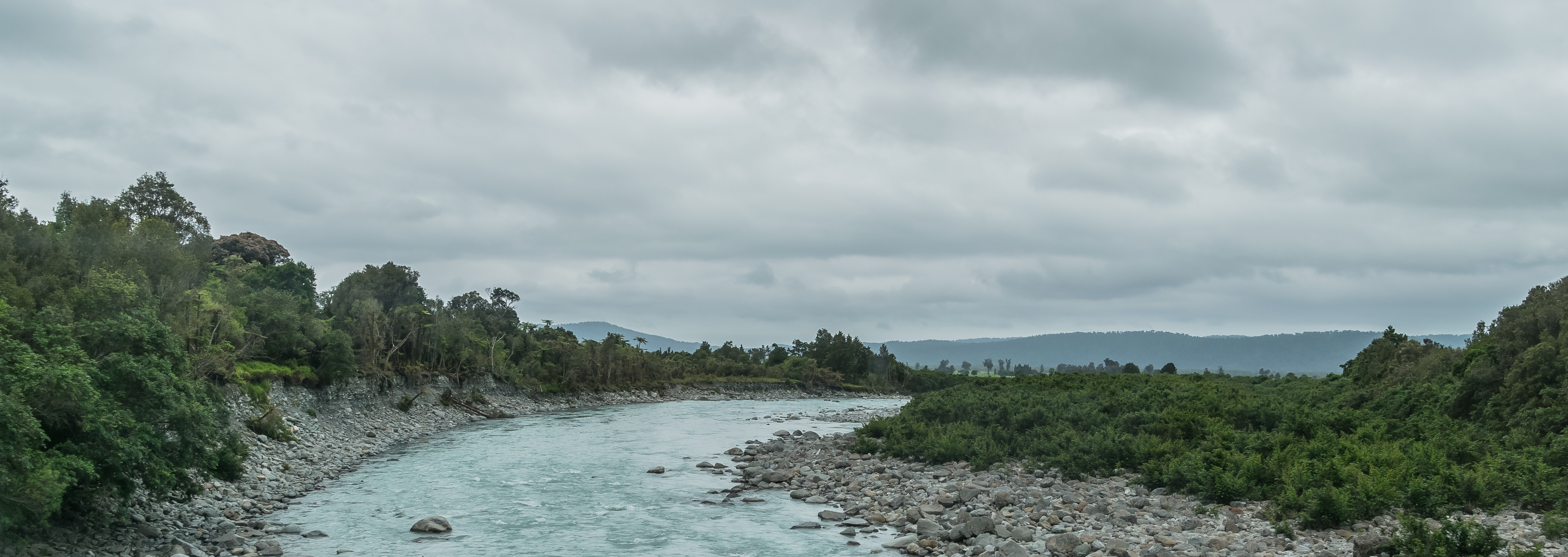
- Cook River near State Highway 6
- Route of Cook River / Weheka
- Mouth of Cook River / Weheka Cook River / Weheka (New Zealand)
- Native name: Weheka

Location
- Country: New Zealand
- Region: West Coast
- District: Westland

Physical characteristics
- Source: La Perouse Glacier
  - location: Southern Alps / Kā Tiritiri o te Moana
  - coordinates: 43.57583°S 170.03888°E
  - elevation: 890 m (2,920 ft)
- Mouth: Tasman Sea
  - location: 2 kilometres (1 mi) south of Gillespies Beach
  - coordinates: 43°25′47″S 169°47′21″E
  - elevation: 0 m (0 ft)
- Length: 34 kilometres (21 mi)

Basin features
- Progression: La Perouse Glacier → Cook River / Weheka → Tasman Sea
- River system: Cook River / Weheka
- Tributaries
  - left: Driblet Creek, Hermit Creek, Bullock Creek (upper section), Bullock Creek (lower section)
  - right: McBain Creek, Balfour River, Fox River, Clearwater River

The Cook River / Weheka is in the South Island of New Zealand. The headwaters are from the La Perouse Glacier on the western flanks of the Southern Alps / Kā Tiritiri o te Moana, and it flows west, then northeast, then northwest and into the Tasman Sea. Its tributaries include the Balfour River, fed by Balfour Glacier, and the Fox River, fed by Fox Glacier / Te Moeka o Tuawe. Much of the river lies within the Westland Tai Poutini National Park. The river was renamed from Cook River to Cook River / Weheka as a result of the Ngāi Tahu Claims Settlement Act 1998.

Brown trout can be fished for in the river.

Access along the river by foot is difficult beyond the junction with the Balfour River. There are no approved helicopter landing sites in the river valley, but there are chamois, tahr and small numbers of red deer available to hunters.
