= Shimizu Station =

Shimizu Station (清水駅, Shimizu eki) is the name of three train stations in Japan:

- Shimizu Station (Aichi)
- Shimizu Station (Osaka)
- Shimizu Station (Shizuoka)

== See also ==
- Shin-Shimizu Station in Shimizu Ward, Shizuoka
