= Noe Station =

Railway station in Osaka, Japan

Noe Station 野江駅
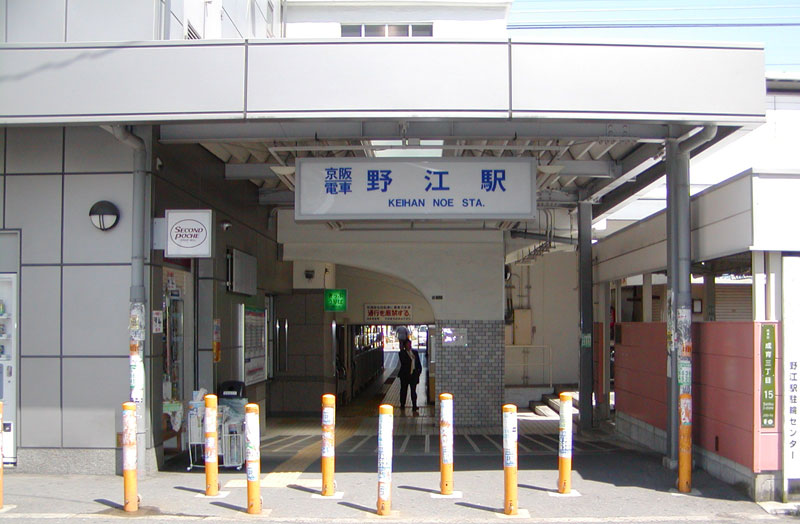
- Noe Station, July 2007

General information
- Location: 3-15-7 Seiiku, Jōtō, Osaka, Osaka （大阪市城東区成育3丁目15番7号） Japan
- Coordinates: 34°42′25.92″N 135°32′36.39″E
- Operator: Keihan Electric Railway
- Line: Keihan Main Line
- Connections: Bus stop

History
- Opened: 1910

Services
Preceding station	Keihan Electric Railway	Following station
Kyōbashi towards Yodoyabashi	Keihan Main Line Local	Sekime towards Sanjō
Location

Noe Station (野江駅, Noe-eki) is a railway station on the Keihan Main Line in Joto-ku, Osaka, Japan, operated by the private railway operator Keihan Electric Railway.

== Lines ==
Noe Station is served by the Keihan Main Line.

== Station layout ==
The station has two side platforms serving two tracks on the 2nd level, outside of the passing tracks.

=== Platforms ===
1	■ Keihan Main Line	for Moriguchishi, Hirakatashi, Sanjo, and Demachiyanagi
2	■ Keihan Main Line	for Kyobashi, Yodoyabashi, and Nakanoshima

== History ==
Noe Station opened on 15 April 1901. It was rebuilt as an elevated station on 15 April 1970.

== Passenger statistics ==
In 2011, the station was used by an average of 11,424 passengers daily.

== Surrounding area ==
- Osaka Municipal Joto Library
- Joto Noe Post Office
- Osaka Municipal Gamo Junior High School
- Osaka Municipal Seiiku Elementary School
- Noe-Uchindai Station (Osaka Municipal Subway Tanimachi Line)
- JR-Noe Station (JR West Osaka Higashi Line)
- Noe Water Shrine
- Kanko Co., Ltd. (Keihan Group)
