= Noe-Uchindai Station =

Metro station in Osaka, Japan

Coordinates: 34.7091°N 135.5382°E

Noe-Uchindai Station 野江内代駅
- Platforms, 2026

General information
- Location: Miyakojima, Osaka; Japan
- System: Osaka Metro
- Operator: Osaka Metro
- Line: Tanimachi Line
- Platforms: 1 island platform
- Tracks: 2
- Connections: Noe Station

Construction
- Structure type: Underground

Other information
- Station code: T 16

History
- Opened: 6 April 1977; 49 years ago

Services
Preceding station	Osaka Metro	Following station
Sekime-Takadono T 15 towards Dainichi	Tanimachi Line	Miyakojima T 17 towards Yaominami
Location
- Location within Osaka Prefecture Location within Japan

Noe-Uchindai Station (野江内代駅, Noe-Uchindai-eki; Station Number: T16) is a metro station on the Osaka Metro Tanimachi Line located in Miyakojima-ku, Osaka, Japan.

== Layout ==
There is an island platform and two tracks underground.

1	■ Tanimachi Line	for Higashi-Umeda, Tennoji and Yaominami
2	■ Tanimachi Line	for Dainichi

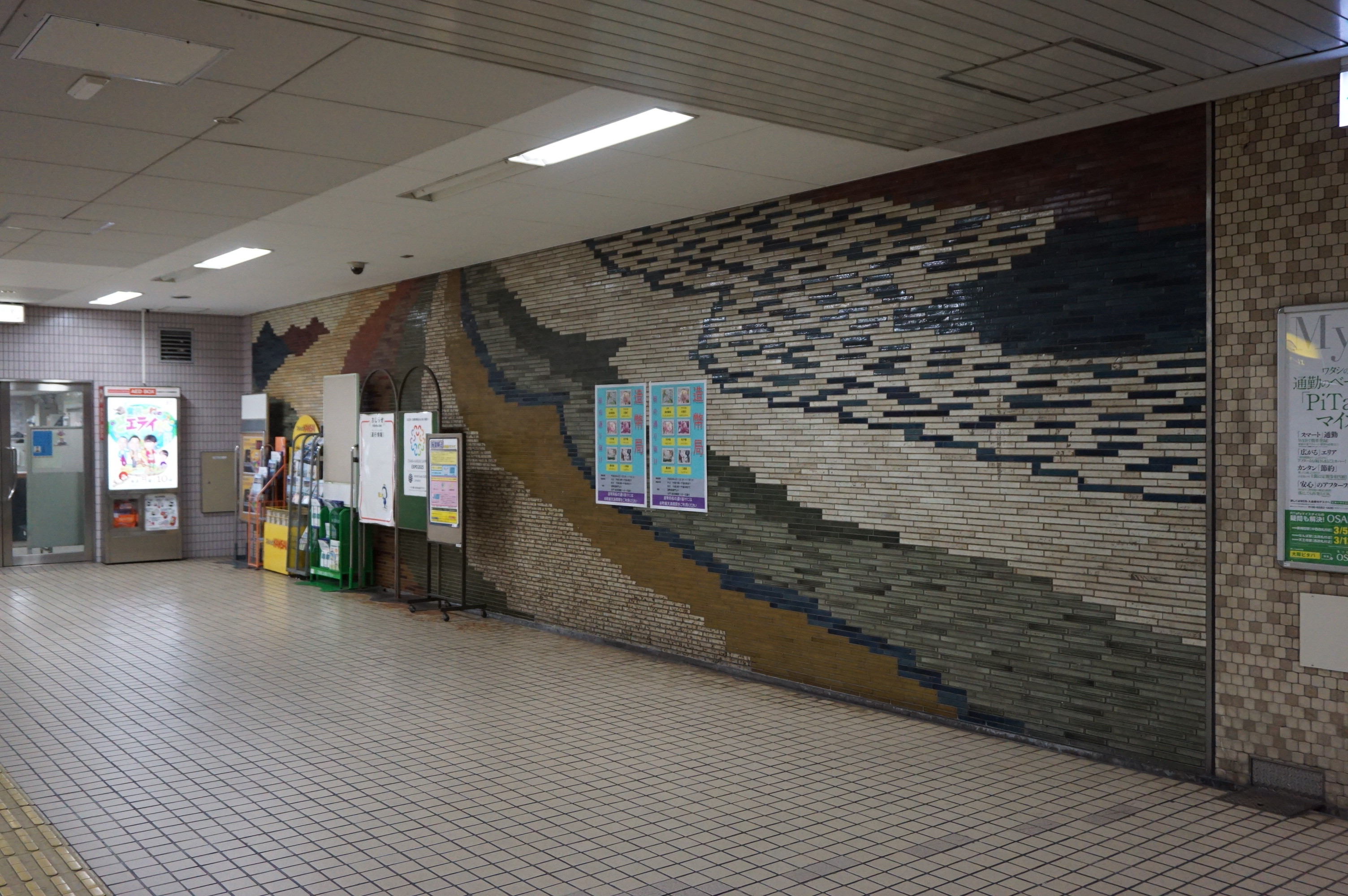
Mural on the concourse level (2018)
