= Sekime-Takadono Station =

Metro station in Osaka, Japan

Coordinates: 34°42′55″N 135°32′45″E

Sekime-Takadono Station 関目高殿駅
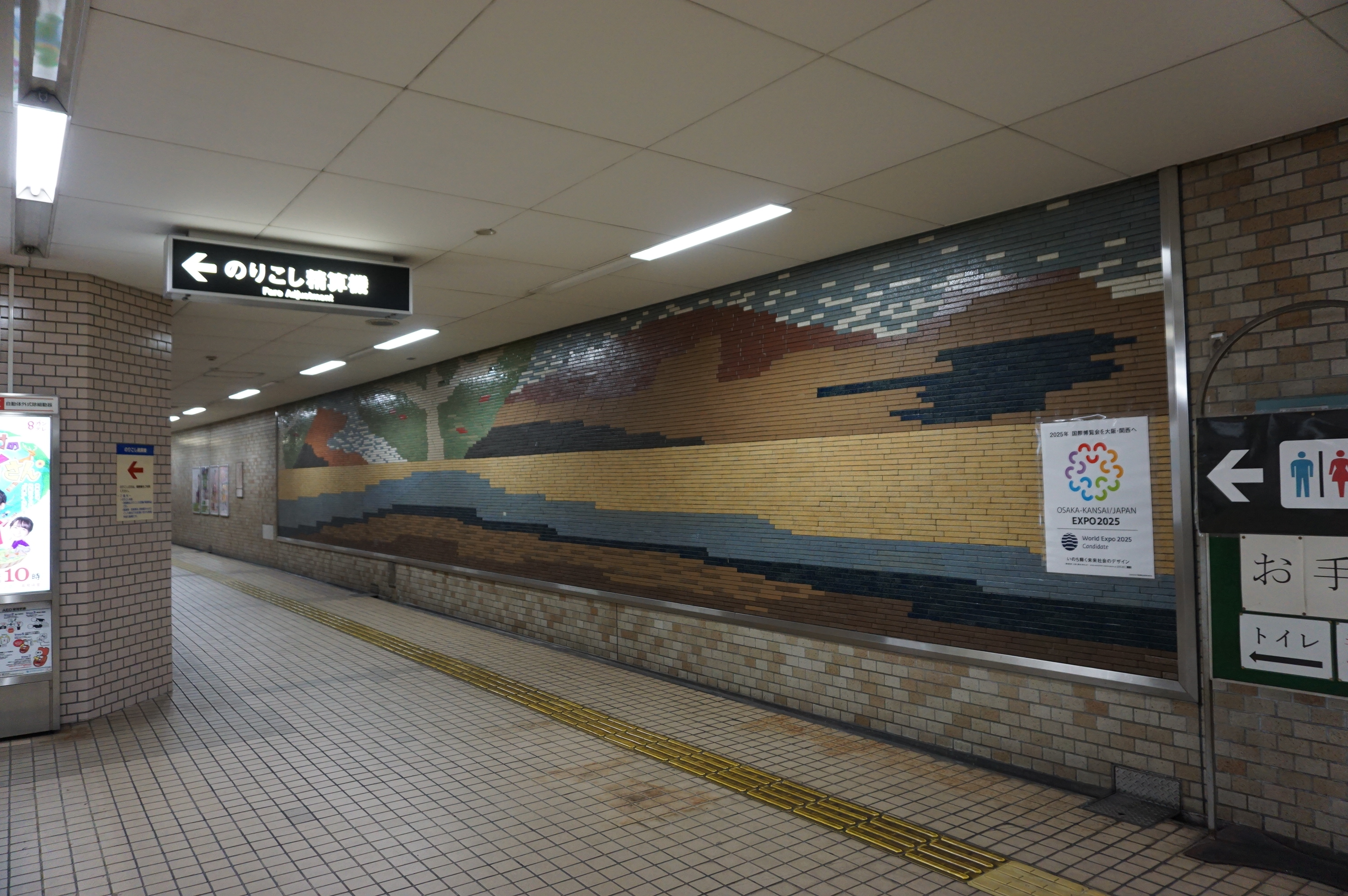

General information
- Location: Osaka; Japan
- System: Osaka Metro
- Operator: Osaka Metro
- Line: Tanimachi Line
- Platforms: 1 island platform
- Tracks: 2

Other information
- Station code: T 15

History
- Opened: 6 April 1977; 49 years ago

Passengers
- FY2016: 14,466 daily

Services
Preceding station	Osaka Metro	Following station
Sembayashi-Omiya T 14 towards Dainichi	Tanimachi Line	Noe-Uchindai T 16 towards Yaominami
Location
- Location within Osaka Prefecture Location within Japan

Sekime-Takadono Station (関目高殿駅, Sekime-Takadono-eki) is a metro station on the Osaka Metro Tanimachi Line (Station Number: T15) located in Asahi-ku, Osaka, Japan.

While situated relatively close to Sekime-Seiiku on the Imazatosuji Line, there are no free transfers between the two stations.

== Layout ==
- There is an island platform with two tracks underground.

1	■ Tanimachi Line	for Higashi-Umeda, Tennoji and Yaominami
2	■ Tanimachi Line	Dainichi

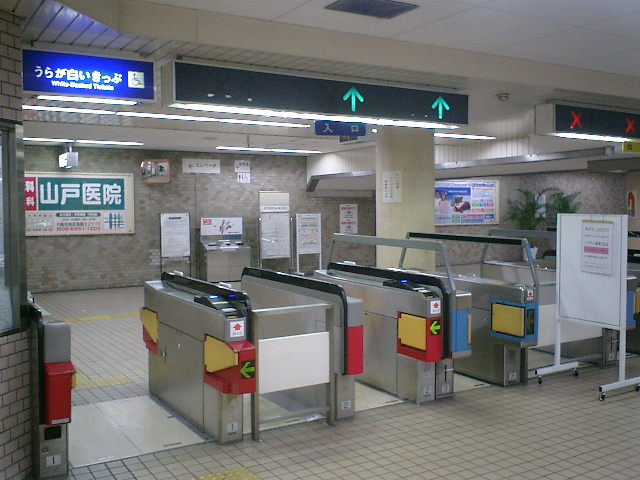
Fare gates (2005)

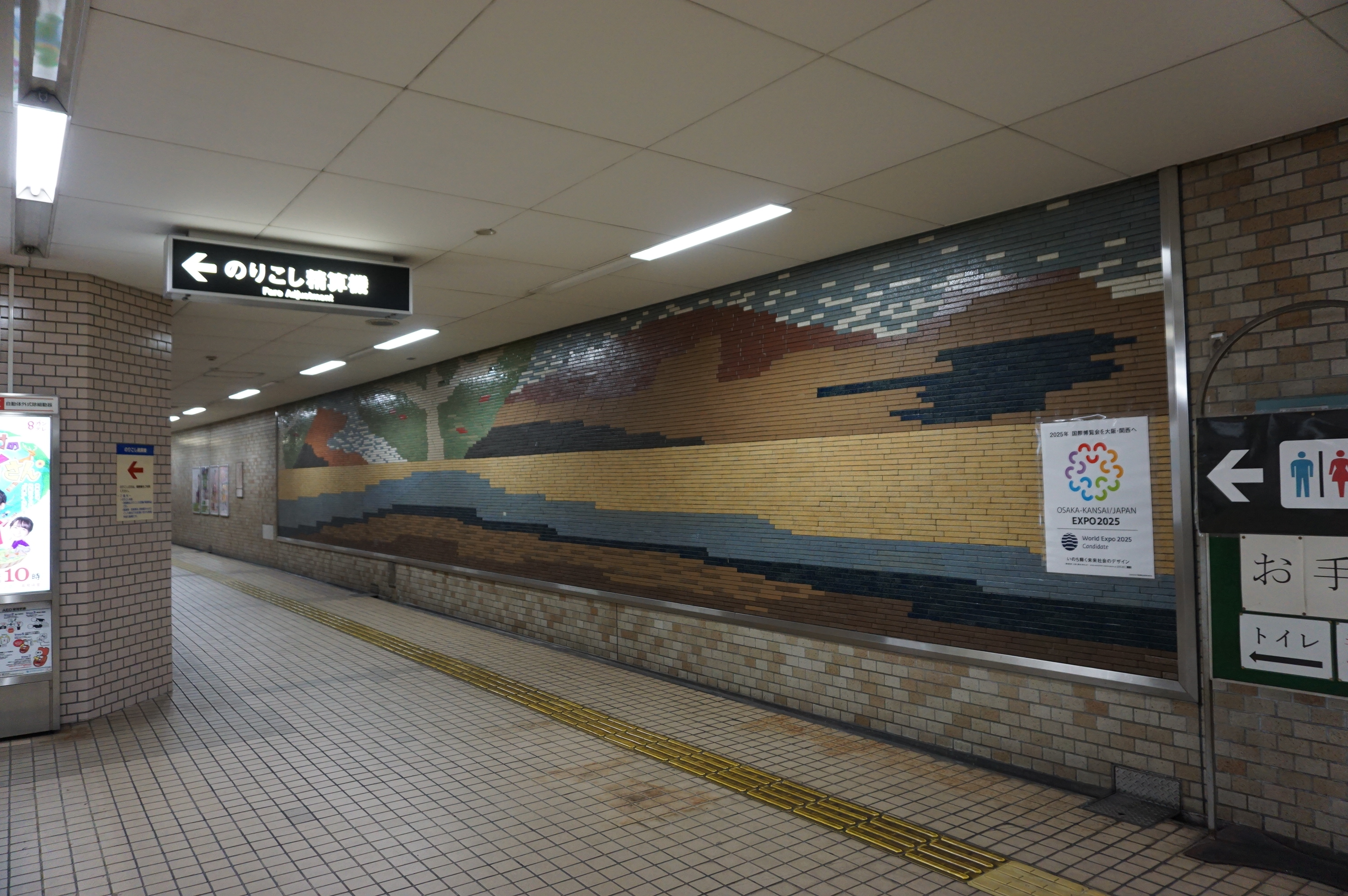
Mural on the concourse level next to the fare gates (2018)
