= Balfour River =

River in the South Island of New Zealand

- Route of the Balfour River
- Mouth of the Balfour River Balfour River (New Zealand)

Location
- Country: New Zealand
- Region: West Coast
- District: Westland

Physical characteristics
- Source: Balfour Glacier
  - coordinates: 43.5504°S 170.0630°E
- Mouth
  - location: Cook River / Weheka
  - coordinates: 43°31′36″S 169°59′16″E
  - elevation: 160 m (520 ft)
- Length: 7.4 kilometres (4.6 mi)

Basin features
- Progression: Balfour River → Cook River / Weheka → Tasman Sea
- Tributaries
  - right: McKenna Creek, Craig Creek

The Balfour River is a river in the Westland district of New Zealand. Its source is the Balfour Glacier and it runs west then northwest for about 7.4 kilometres (5 mi) to the Cook River / Weheka.

== See also ==
- List of rivers of New Zealand
