= Chancellor Hut =

Alpine hut in the Southern Alps

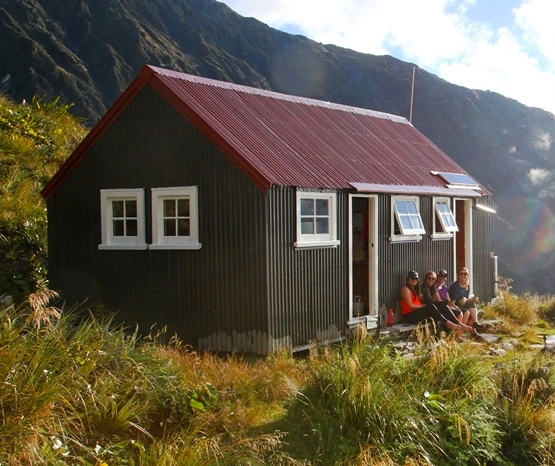

General information
- Location: Fox Glacier / Te Moeka o Tuawe, West Coast Region, New Zealand
- Coordinates: 43°30′37″S 170°06′31″E
- Completed: January 1931

Heritage New Zealand – Category 2
- Designated: 7 July 1993
- Reference no.: 5479

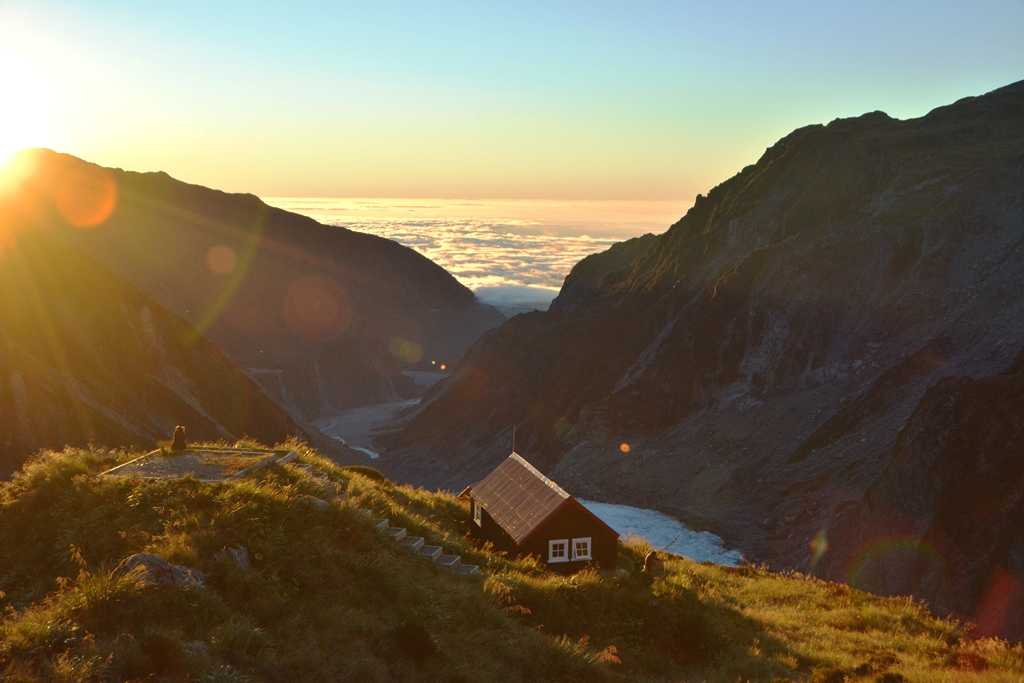
Aerial view of Chancellor Hut

Chancellor Hut is an alpine hut in the Southern Alps of New Zealand. It is located on the Chancellor Ridge near the edge of a cliff, 200 metres (660 ft) above the Fox Glacier, at an altitude of 1,260 metres (4,130 ft) above sea level in the Westland Tai Poutini National Park. The hut was built between 1930 and 1931, and is listed by Heritage New Zealand as a Category 2 historic place. It is the oldest hut in the Southern Alps still on its original site. It is rectangular in plan, 7.4 by 3.4 metres (24 by 11 ft), has timber-frame walls clad with corrugated iron and a gabled corrugated iron roof. Inside, the hut has tongue and groove timber flooring, with two cooking benches in the main room with a door leading to the bunk room with 12 bunks.

Kea and non-native chamois may be seen in the vicinity of the hut. Also visible from the hut are the highest peaks of the Southern Alps.

== History ==
Mountain guides Alec and Peter Graham lobbied the Ministry of Tourist and Health Resorts regarding the need for the hut, and in the Public Works estimates tabled in Parliament in October 1929, £400 was allocated to the project. Plans were drawn up and tenders for the supply of materials to build the hut were called for the following month. In the Public Works estimates presented to Parliament in October 1930, £350 was voted to the construction of Chancellor Hut, with only £170 having been spent in the previous year. The hut was built between 1930 and 1931 by the Graham brothers, with assistance from other mountaineers who took building materials up the Fox Glacier piece by piece in late 1930. Construction was completed in January 1931. It was originally painted orange, the windows on the north and south were originally sash, but were later replaced by hopper casements. It originally had separate rooms for men and women, but these were combined after social attitudes of mixing genders shifted. The hut originally had a fireplace and chimney on the eastern wall, but these were removed in 1972. That same year, the front of the hut was re-piled, exterior doors and windows were replaced, along with some of the timber. In 1976, a new window was added to the eastern wall, the former location of the fireplace. In 2000, drains were installed, some structural timber elements replaced and extra structural bracing added.

== See also ==
- Hiking in New Zealand
- Wilderness hut
