= Shimizu Station (Osaka) =

Metro station in Osaka, Japan

Coordinates: 34.7216°N 135.5608°E

Shimizu Station 清水駅
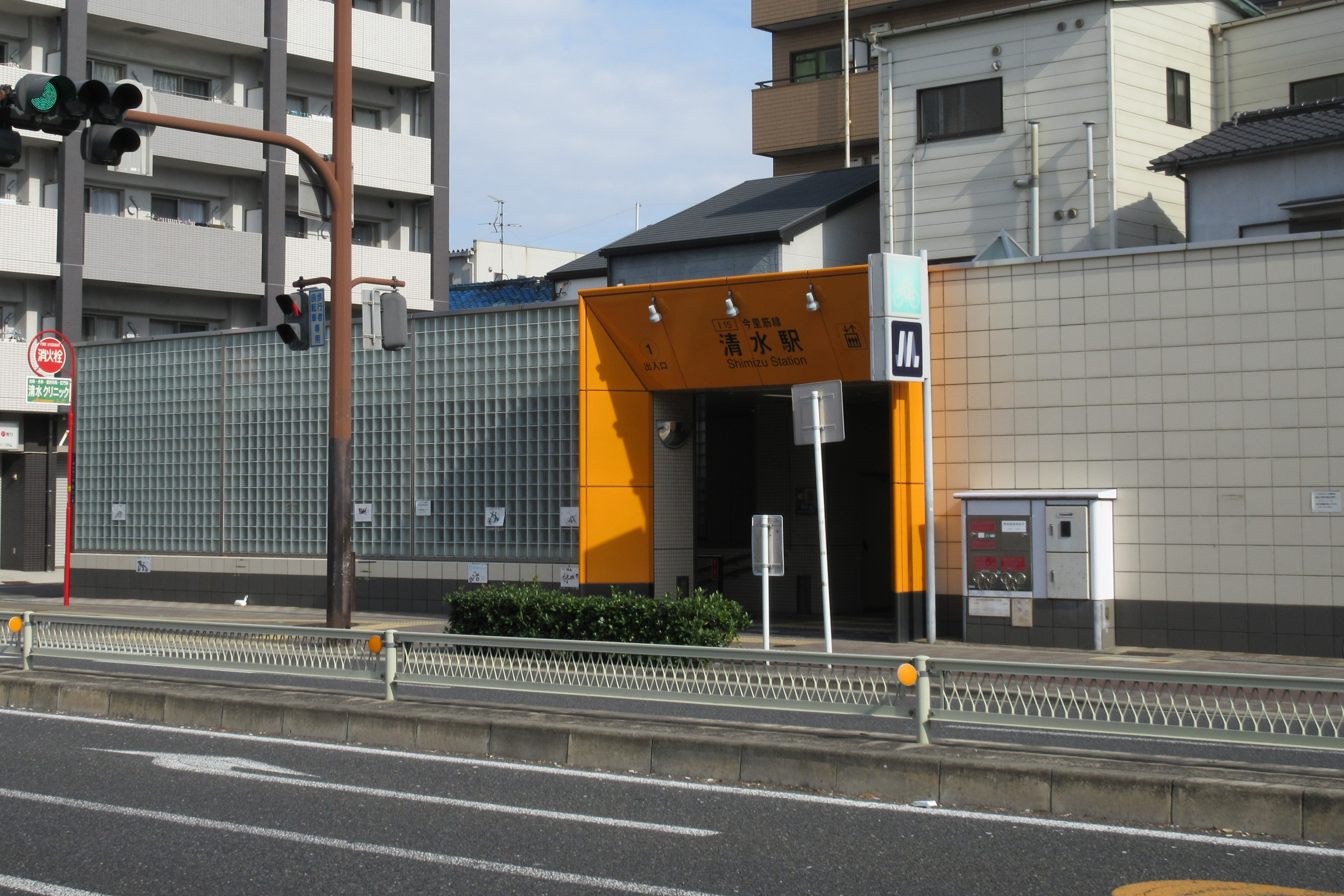
- Exit 1

General information
- Location: Asahi, Osaka, Osaka; Japan
- System: Osaka Metro
- Operator: Osaka Metro
- Line: Imazatosuji Line
- Platforms: 1 island platform
- Tracks: 2
- Connections: Underground

Other information
- Station code: I 15

History
- Opened: 24 December 2006; 19 years ago

Passengers
- FY2016: 5,439 daily

Services
Preceding station	Osaka Metro	Following station
Taishibashi-Imaichi I 14 towards Itakano	Imazatosuji Line	Shimmori-Furuichi I 16 towards Imazato
Location
- Location within Osaka Prefecture Location within Japan

Shimizu Station (清水駅, Shimizu-eki; station number: I15) is a train station on the Osaka Metro Imazatosuji Line in Asahi-ku, Osaka, Japan. It is the least used subway station in the Osaka Metro network, with only 5,439 people using the station daily in 2016. However, it is not the least used station in the entire network, as several stations of the Nankō Port Town Line have lower ridership figures.

== Layout ==
The station has an island platform fenced with platform gates between two tracks underground. Two siding tracks are located in the south of the station and connect to Tsurumi-ryokuchi-kita Depot and Tsurumi Inspection Depot.

1	■ Imazatosuji Line	for Gamo-yonchome, Midoribashi and Imazato
2	■ Imazatosuji Line	for Taishibashi-Imaichi and Itakano
