= Clearwater Lake (Cook County, Minnesota) =

Lake in the state of Minnesota, United States

- Location within Minnesota
- Interactive map of Clearwater Lake
- Location: Cook County, Minnesota
- Coordinates: 48°5′11″N 90°19′15″W
- Type: Lake
- Surface elevation: 1,663 feet (507 m)

Clearwater Lake is a lake in Cook County, Minnesota, in the United States.

Clearwater Lake is an English translation of the Ojibwe-language name.

== See also ==
- List of lakes in Minnesota
