= Fox River (Westland) =

River in Westland District, New Zealand

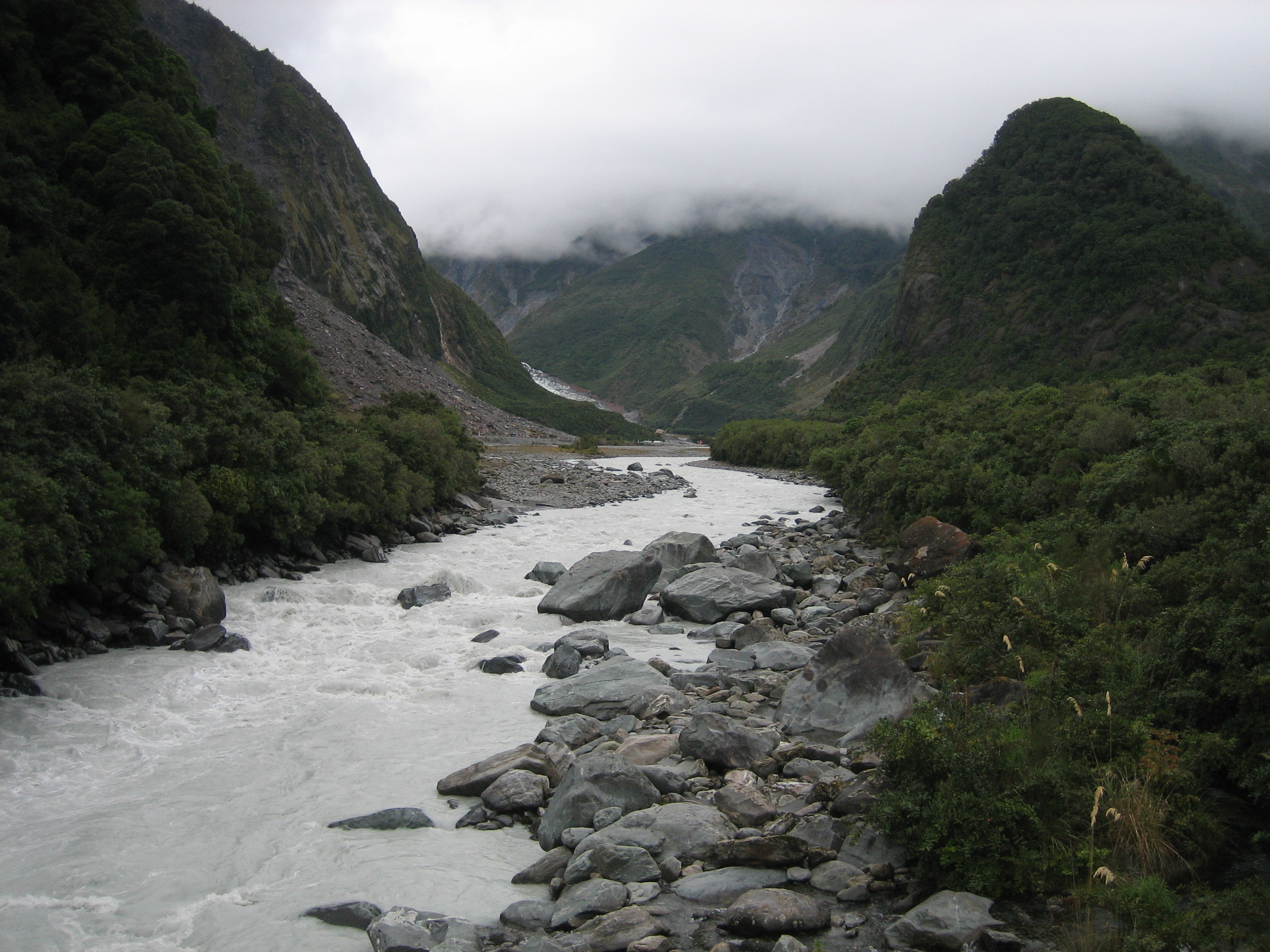
- River near the head of the glacier
- Route of the Fox River
- Mouth of the Fox River Fox River (Westland) (New Zealand)
- Etymology: Named after William Fox

Location
- Country: New Zealand
- Region: West Coast
- District: Westland

Physical characteristics
- Source: Fox Glacier
  - coordinates: 43.50166°S 170.065°E
  - elevation: 975 m (3,199 ft)
- Mouth: Cook River / Weheka
  - coordinates: 43°28′18″S 169°55′21″E
  - elevation: 70 metres (230 ft)
- Length: 8 km (5.0 mi)

Basin features
- Progression: Fox Glacier → Fox River → Cook River / Weheka → Tasman Sea
- River system: Cook River / Weheka
- Tributaries
  - left: Boyd Creek, Straight Creek, Mills Creek, Bath Creek, Ribbonwood Creek
  - right: Alf Creek, Harry Creek, Fowler Creek, Serac Creek, Yellow Creek

The Fox River is a river in the Westland District of New Zealand. It arises in two places; from a spring in the Fox Range, and from the head of the Fox Glacier. It runs west into the Cook River / Weheka, shortly before it exits into the Tasman Sea.

The Department of Conservation maintains short walks alongside the river.

In 2020 the contents of a rubbish dump next to the river were washed downstream and along the coast.
