= Clear River =

Clear River can refer to:

- Clear River (Sitka, Alaska), a river in the city-borough of Sitka, Alaska
- Clear River (Yukon-Koyukuk, Alaska), a river in the Yukon-Koyukuk Census Area, Alaska
- Clear River (Rhode Island), a river in northwest Rhode Island
- Clear River (Alberta), a river in northern Alberta, Canada, a tributary of the Peace River
- Clear River (British Columbia), a tributary of the Kingcome River in the Central Coast region of British Columbia, Canada
- Clear Rivers, a fictional character from the Final Destination series
- Klarälven, a river in Sweden and Norway

== See also ==
- Qingshui (disambiguation), Chinese for Clear River
- Lô River, Vietnamese for Clear River
- Evil in Clear River, 1988 U.S made-for-TV film
