= William H. Clearwater =

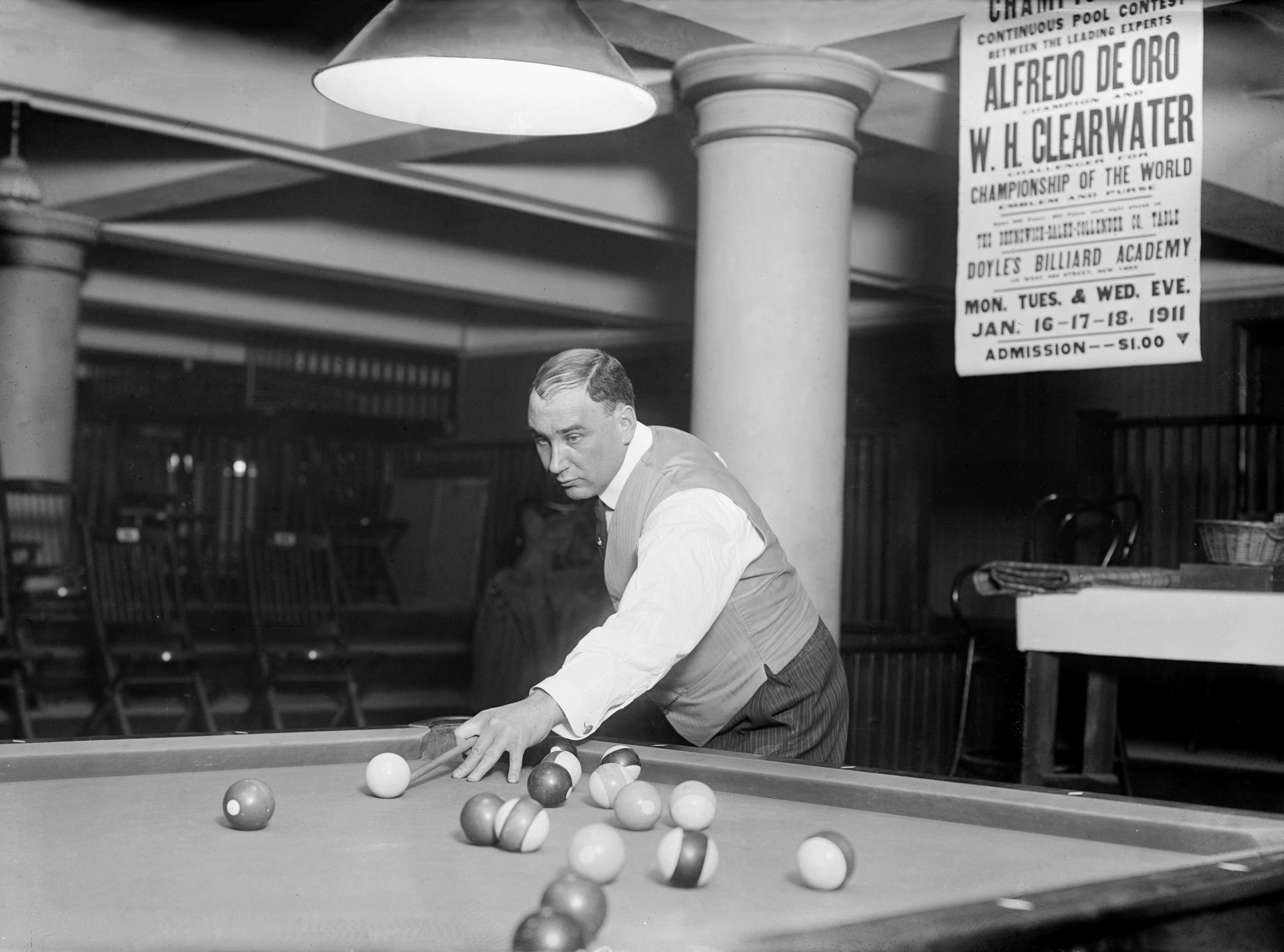
William H. Clearwater (c.1911)

William Henry Clearwater (November 14, 1868 or 1875 – September 24, 1948) of Ellwood, Pennsylvania was the pocket billiards and continuous pool champion of the world.
