= Fox Glacier =

Glacier in the Southern Alps, New Zealand

- Fox Glacier / Te Moeka o Tuawe
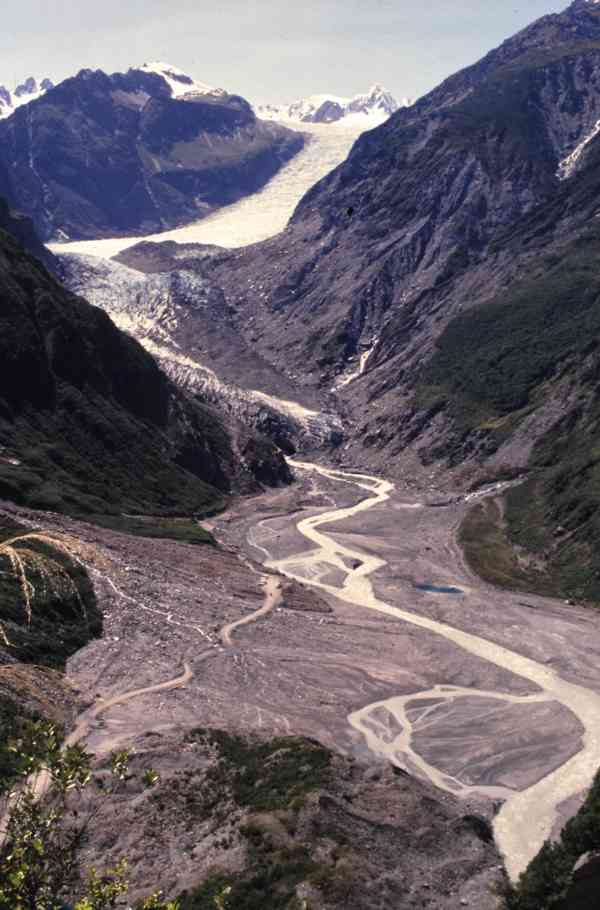

- Location within New Zealand
- Location: Westland Tai Poutini National Park
- Coordinates: 43.502°S 170.081°E
- Length: 13 km (8.1 mi)
- Status: Retreating

Fox Glacier (Māori: Te Moeka o Tuawe; officially Fox Glacier / Te Moeka o Tuawe) is an 11.7-kilometre-long (7.3 mi) (2022) temperate maritime glacier located in Westland Tai Poutini National Park on the West Coast of New Zealand's South Island. Covering about 32 km^{2} including its tributaries, Fox Glacier is the third largest glacier in New Zealand. Like nearby Franz Josef Glacier, Fox Glacier is one of the most accessible glaciers in the world, with a terminal face as low as 300 m above sea level, close to the village of Fox Glacier. It is a major tourist attraction and about 1000 people daily visit it during high tourist season.

== Naming ==
The glacier is known by local Māori as Te Moeka o Tuawe ('The bed of Tuawe'). According to oral tradition, Hine Hukatere loved climbing in the mountains and persuaded her lover Tuawe to climb with her. Tuawe was a less experienced climber than Hine Hukatere but loved to accompany her, until an avalanche swept him from the peaks to his death. Hine Hukatere was broken-hearted and her many, many tears flowed down the mountain. Rangi the Sky Father took pity on her and froze them to form the glacier now known as Franz Josef / Kā Roimata o Hine Hukatere; the glacier now known as Fox marks Tuawe's resting place.

In 1857 local Māori led Pākehā Leonard Harper and Edwin Fox to both glaciers, the first Europeans to see them. In 1865, German geologist Julius von Haast was the first to explore and survey the glaciers at the head of this valley, and named them Victoria and Albert, after the queen and her consort. The Victoria Glacier kept its name, but the lower part of the Albert Glacier was renamed in 1872 after a visit by then Premier of New Zealand Sir William Fox.

Explorer Charlie Douglas had already visited the glacier himself in the 1860s, looking for a cow. "In those ancient days I did not pay much attention to the glaciers," he later wrote.

With the passage of the Ngāi Tahu Claims Settlement Act 1998, the glacier's name changed once again to Fox Glacier / Te Moeka o Tuawe.

== Geography ==
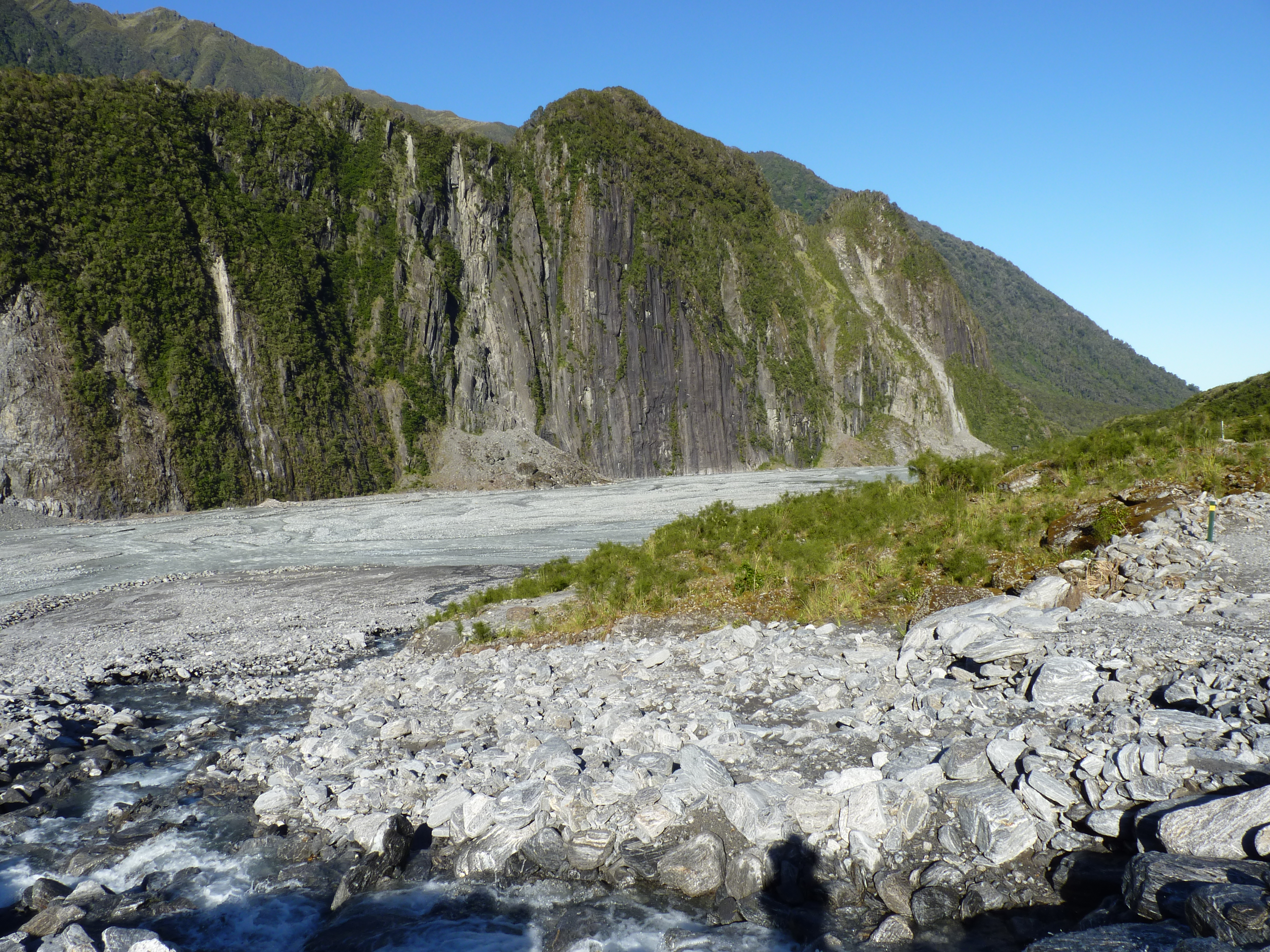
Fox River valley downstream from the glacier

Fed by four alpine glaciers, Fox Glacier descends 2,600 m (8,500 ft) on its 13 km journey from the Southern Alps towards the coast, finishing near rainforest 300 metres (980 ft) above sea level. It lies within the Fox Glacier / Te Moeka o Tuawe catchment on the West Coast of New Zealand's South Island. The catchment covers about 110 km^{2} and extends westward from the Main Divide to the Tasman Sea. It is bounded by the Victoria Range to the north and the Fox Range to the south, and includes the Fox Glacier and its alpine tributaries, the Victoria and Mascarin glacier valleys, the Fox River valley, and a broad alluvial floodplain extending to the coast. The landscape is marked by very high relief, rising from sea level to peaks of about 3,000 m in less than 35 km.

After retreating for most of the previous 100 years, it advanced between 1985 and 2009. In 2006, the average rate of advance was about a metre a week. In January 2009, the terminal face of the glacier was still advancing and its vertical or overhanging faces regularly collapsed. Since then there has been a significant retreat, with the 2009 high level clearly visible as vegetation line on the southern slope above what is left of the lower glacier today.

The outflow of the glacier forms the Fox River. During the last ice age, its ice reached beyond the present coastline, and the glacier left behind many moraines during its retreat. Lake Matheson formed as a kettle lake within one of these.

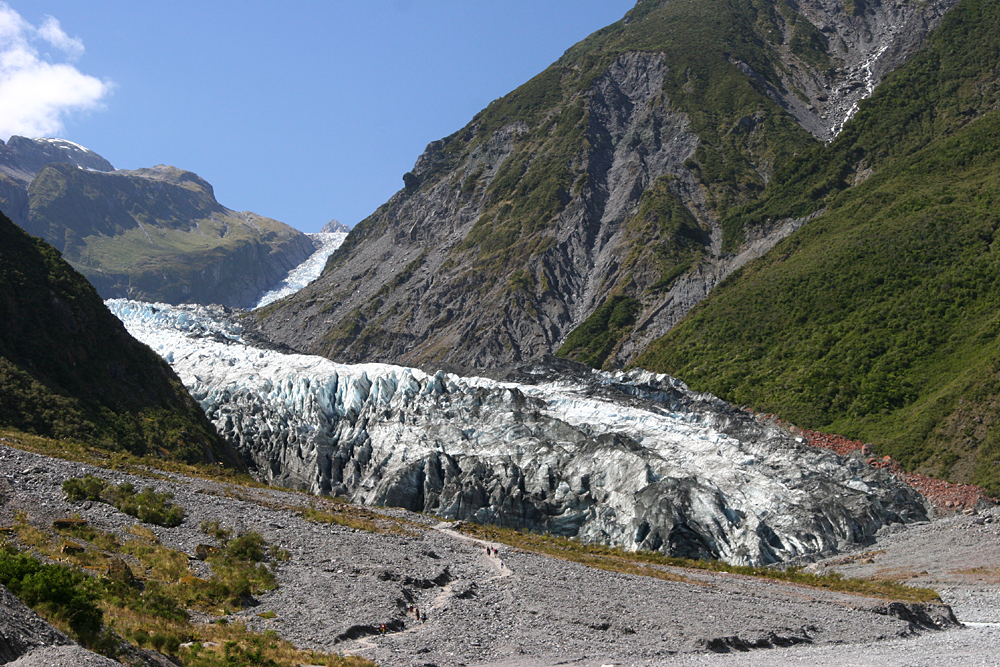
2007

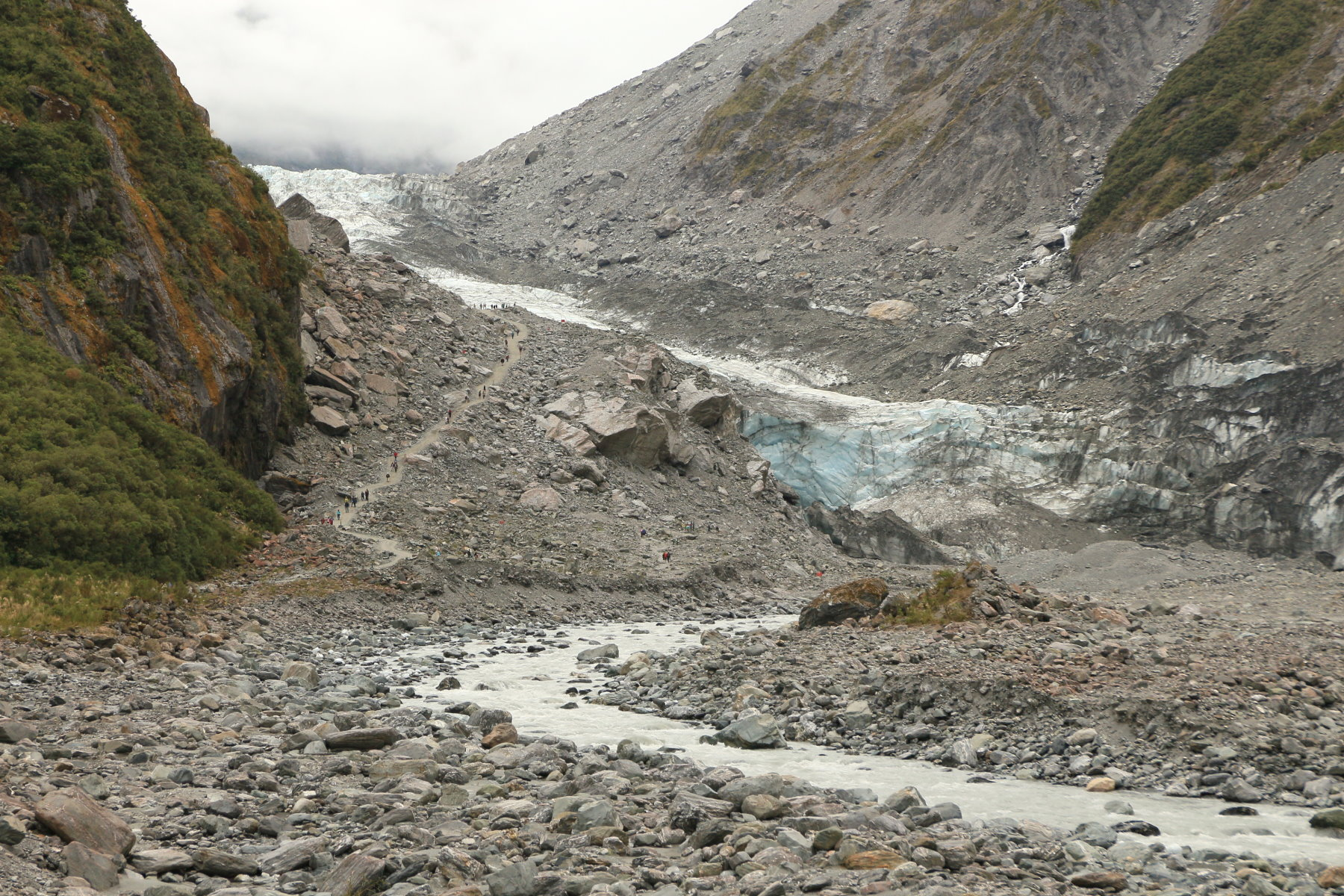
2013

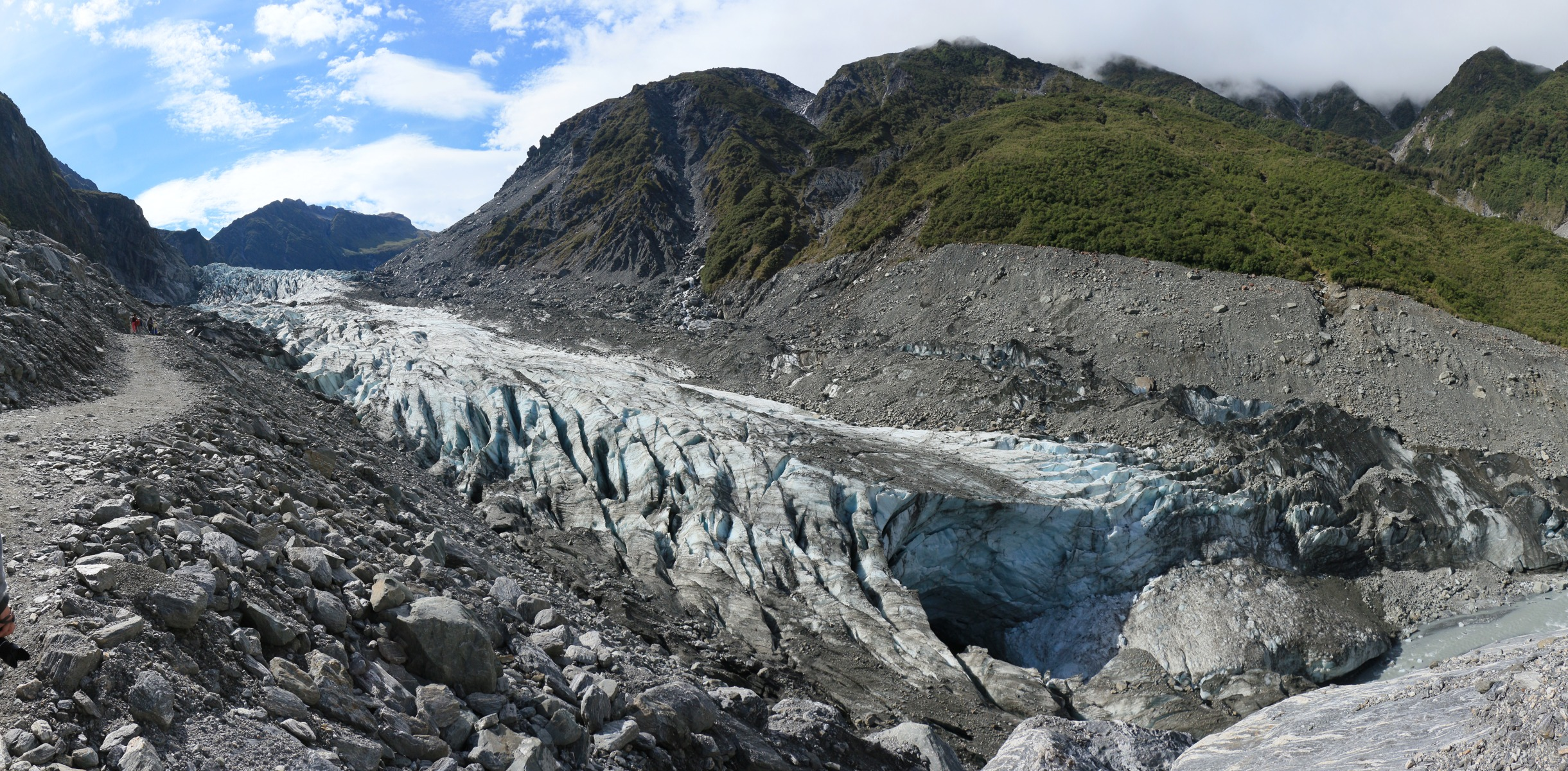
2013, showing the maximum height of the glacier reached around 2009

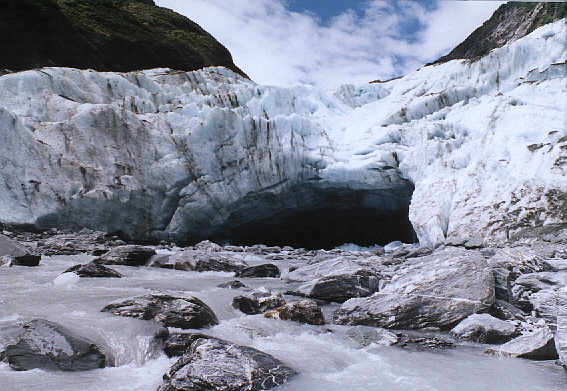
Fox River emerging from the glacier terminus

Fox Glacier in winter 2025

== Advance and retreat ==
Fox Glacier has undergone repeated phases of advance and retreat since the 1960s. The glacier has experienced three advance-retreat phases over the last half century, with the most recent retreat phase beginning in 2008.

Although Fox Glacier regained about 300 m of length during its last advance phase, it has retreated more than 3 km since the 1880s. Fox Glacier is highly sensitive to climate variability because of its steep mass-balance gradient and large, high-elevation accumulation area, and its terminus responds rapidly to changes in mass balance, with an estimated response time of 3 to 9 years.

Fox Glacier has retreated beyond its previous 1984 minimum sometime between 2014 and 2017 and had reached its furthest point up-valley by 2022. Between 2017 and 2022 alone, the glacier retreated 374 m, reaching its shortest length in recorded history, 11.7 km.

== Precipitation and extreme weather events ==
The West Coast of New Zealand is the wettest region in the country, and the Fox Glacier catchment receives rain and snow throughout the year, including frequent heavy rainfall events. Rainfall in the catchment varies a lot by location. The highest parts of the Southern Alps receive more than 10 m of precipitation each year, while areas near the coast receive less than one third of that amount. Average annual precipitation across the Fox Glacier catchment is more than 8 m per year.

This heavy precipitation plays a major role in shaping the Fox Glacier valley. It affects hillsides, rivers, and the glacier itself, and can trigger landslides, debris flows, and rockfall by soaking the ground and entering cracks in rock. In alpine areas, precipitation can fall as either rain or snow, so it can both add to and reduce glacier mass. Heavy rain events at the lower parts of Fox and Franz Josef Glaciers have also been linked to increased melting, outburst floods, and ice collapses.

Human-induced climate change is affecting precipitation patterns and intensity around the world. On the West Coast of New Zealand, total annual rainfall has increased over the past century, and rainfall is expected to become more intense and more variable with further global warming.

Extreme rainfall events on the West Coast are often associated with atmospheric rivers, which carry large amounts of moisture from the tropics. In the Fox Glacier catchment, these events can cause major landscape change, including river widening or rerouting, landslides, rockfall, glacier outburst floods, and changes in glacier growth and melting.

== Tourism ==
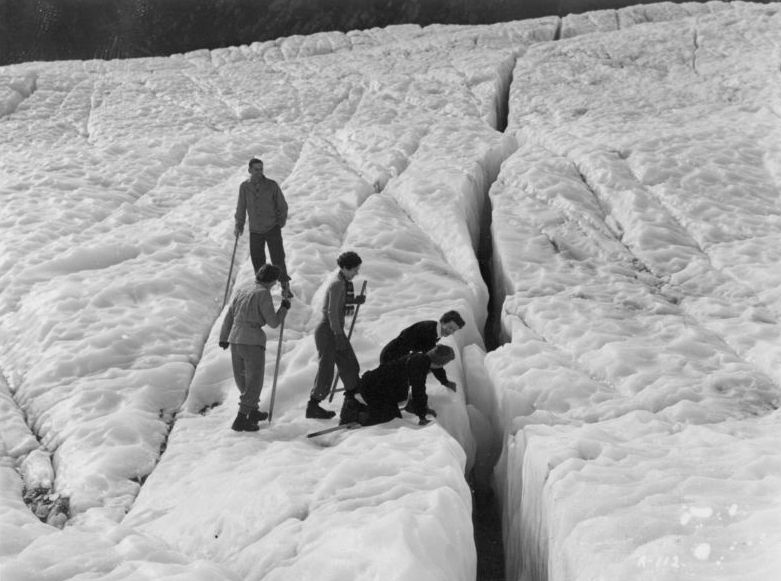
Early tour group inspecting a crevasse

In an 1890s report on "Tourist Attractions in the Okarito District", Charlie Douglas listed several sights in the Fox Glacier area, including the view from Malcolm's Knob at the mouth of the Cook River. "If the road was cleared up through to Cook's [Flat] it would be an easy day's stage through to the Fox Glacier; one day would do that place, thence down to Malcolms Knob and Gillespies," he wrote. He also noted the road between the farming settlement of Weheka at Fox Glacier and Waiho to the north (now Franz Josef) was very poor. "…when I came through that way, I left the track and took to the bush as being far better walking." By 1903 it had been improved and Dr Ebenezer Teichelmann described it as a good horse track.

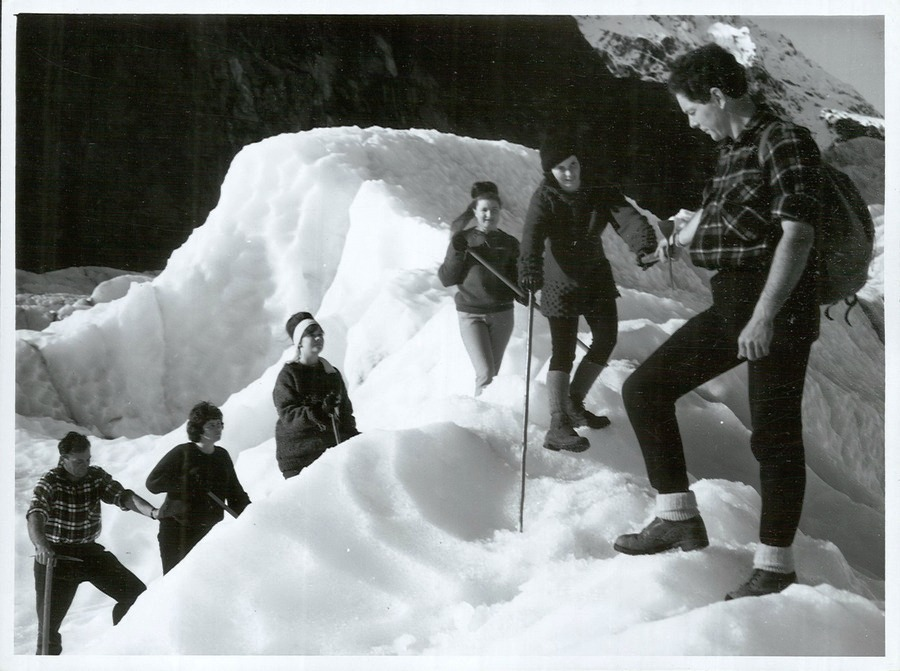
Tour group in 1966

Douglas had previously surveyed the glacier with A.P. Harper and William Wilson, and had built the first hut there, known as the iron hut, near the 1896 glacier terminal.

In the 1920s Westland was being marketed as a tourist destination for the scenic vistas of its mountains, lakes and forests. Visitors to Weheka would stay in the Williams or Sullivan homesteads, until in 1928 the Sullivan brothers opened the first hotel in the valley, the 40-room Fox Glacier Hostel (which, expanded and refurbished several times over the years, is still operating as a hotel).

Official glacier guiding began at this point, employing well-known mountaineers like Frank Alack, Harry Ayres, and Tom Christie. Access to the glacier was via a track along the north side of the Fox River valley and across a swingbridge. They could climb onto the ice at a lunch shelter at the Chalet Viewpoint, built in 1931 (and which burnt down in 1973). As the glacier retreated a gallery was built along the side of Cone Rock to allow access, until it retreated still further. Eventually the northern route became the main access road for tourists.

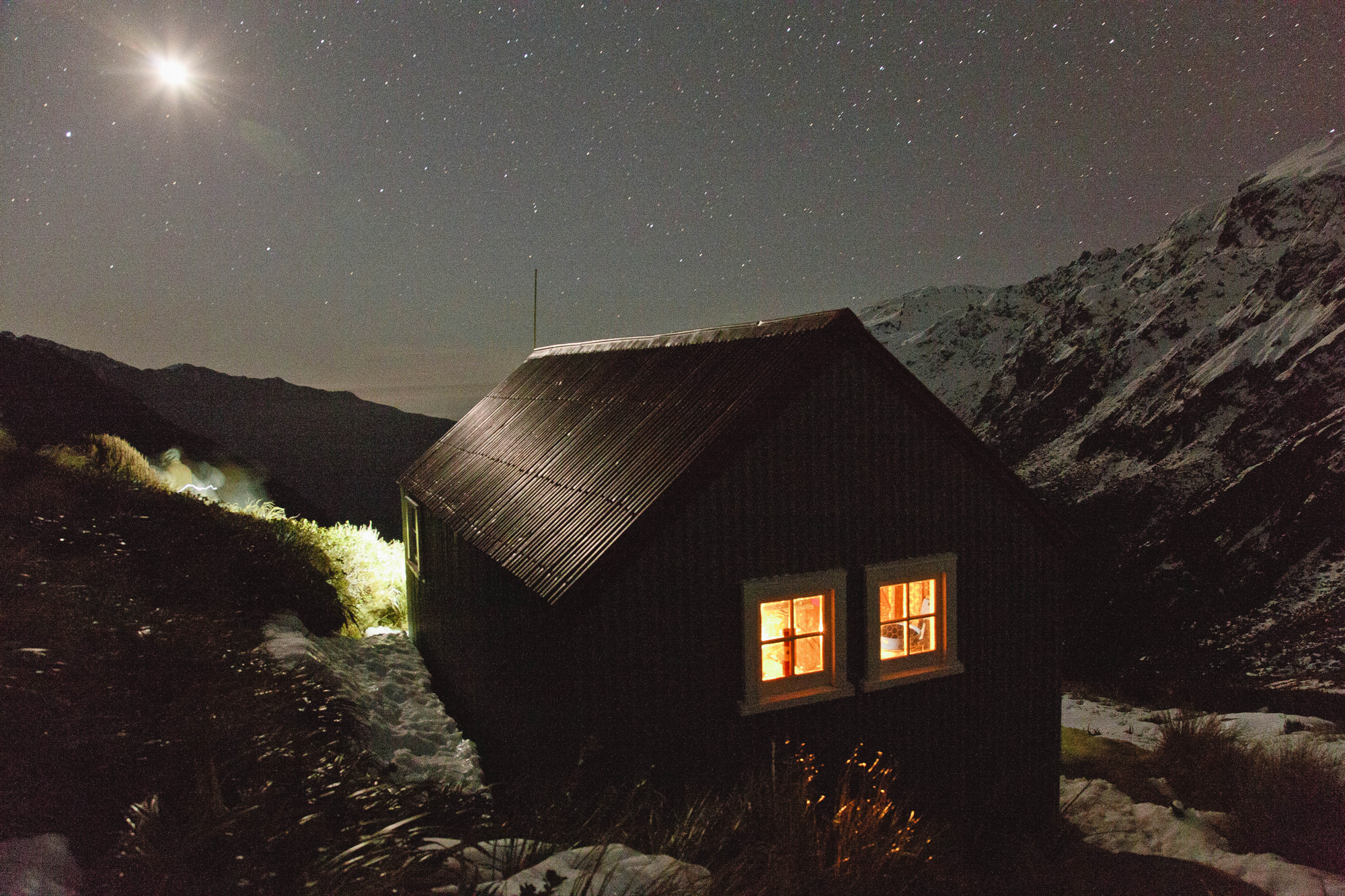
Chancellor Hut in 2014

Chancellor Hut was built in 1930–31 on the southwest face of Chancellor Ridge, now 200 m above the glacier. Planned by mountain guides Alec and Peter Graham in 1929, all the materials had to be packed up Fox Glacier manually in 1930 in the days before helicopter airlifts. It is the oldest remaining mountain hut in the Southern Alps still on its original site, and is a Category II Historic Building on the Heritage New Zealand list. At an altitude of 1200 m, it was designed to provide climbing opportunities to tourists, rather than as a staging post for mountaineers climbing on the Great Divide. A hut was also built at 5,000 feet (1,500 m) on Craig's Peak (6,000 feet (1,800 m)) for overnight climbing trips.

In the early 1930s and early 1940s roads were built up the northern and southern sides of the valley to improve access. The northern road led to main car park for tourists who wanted to walk up to the glacier face, although barriers and warning signs prevented them from entering the "danger zone" close to the active glacier face. Safety warnings were ignored, however, by up to one third of the 600,000 tourists a year visiting West Coast glaciers. Two Australian tourists were killed in January 2009 after they crossed safety barriers and walked 500 m to the terminal face to take photos. On 21 November 2015, seven people were killed when a Eurocopter Écureuil (squirrel) helicopter operated by Alpine Adventures crashed on the glacier.

On 26 March 2019 heavy rains caused flooding in the area, destroying the Waiho Bridge across State Highway 6 at Franz Josef. The rains also triggered an enormous landslide in the Fox River valley that washed away about 150 m of the northern glacier access road and destroyed the car park. The road had already been washed out several times in the previous year, and just two months previously it had been repaired at a cost of $430,000. The Alpine Gardens landslide comprises 50–70 million cubic metres of rock and as of October 2020 is still active, moving 100–700 mm a day. The road has been closed indefinitely, with no practical solutions available for repairing it, and access to the glacier is now by helicopter. To compensate for the closure of the access road, a $3.9 million spending package was announced in August 2019 for other tourism projects around Fox Glacier: extending a cycleway to Lake Matheson, upgrading and reopening the track to Lake Gault, improving the road and track access on the south side of the Fox River valley, and reopening the coastal walkway to Galway Beach north of Gillespies Beach.

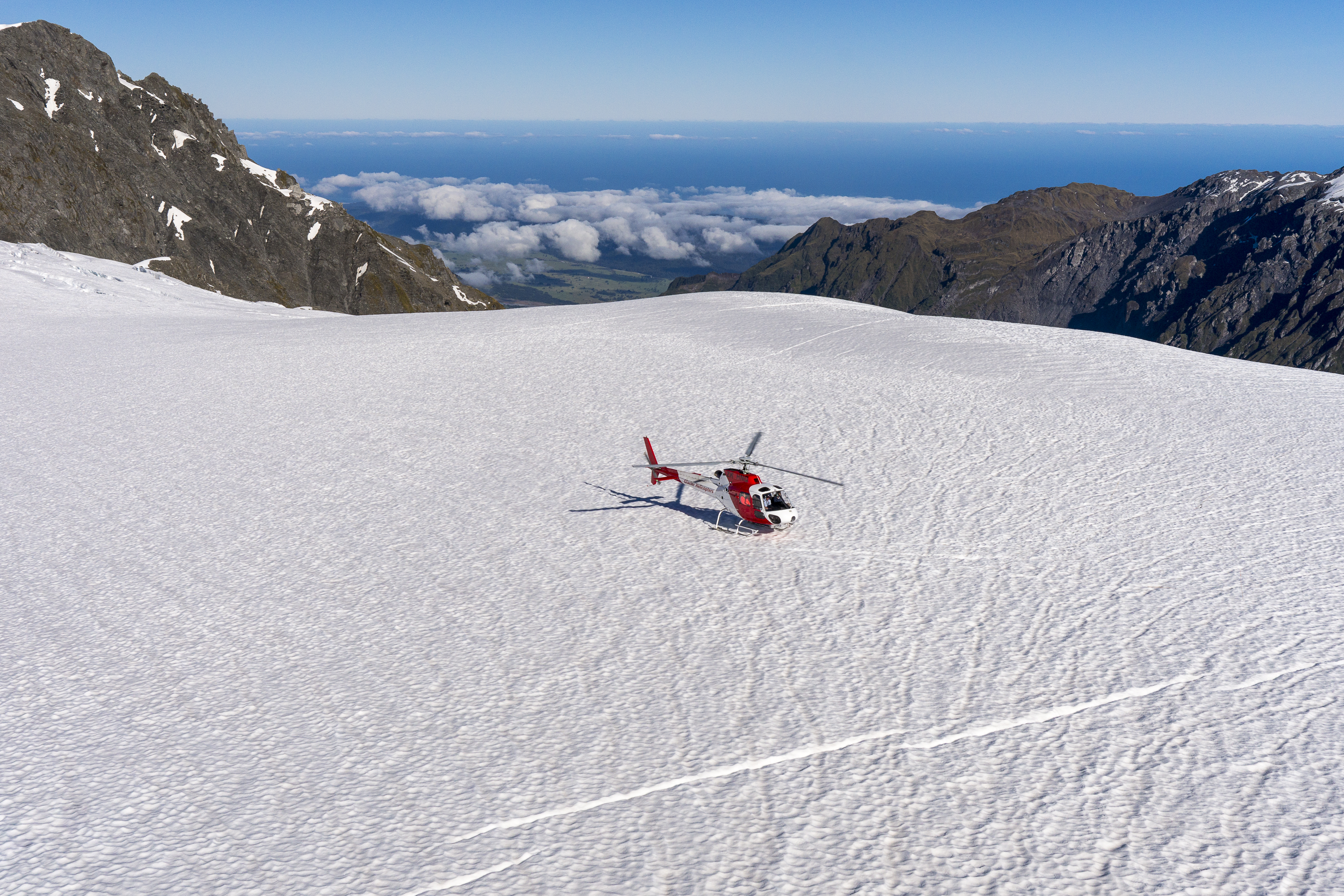
The névé of Fox Glacier

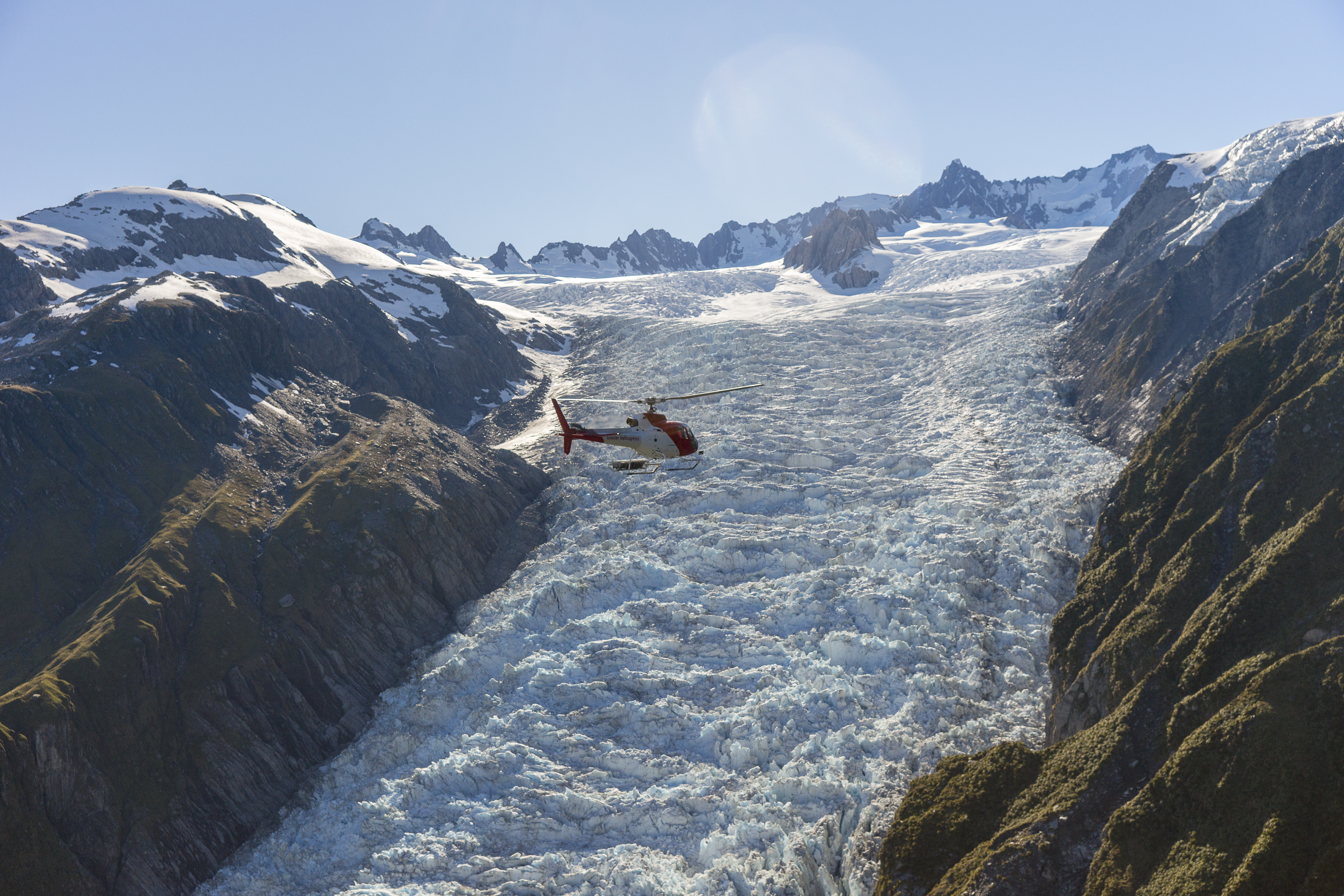
The upper slope of Fox Glacier above Victoria Flat

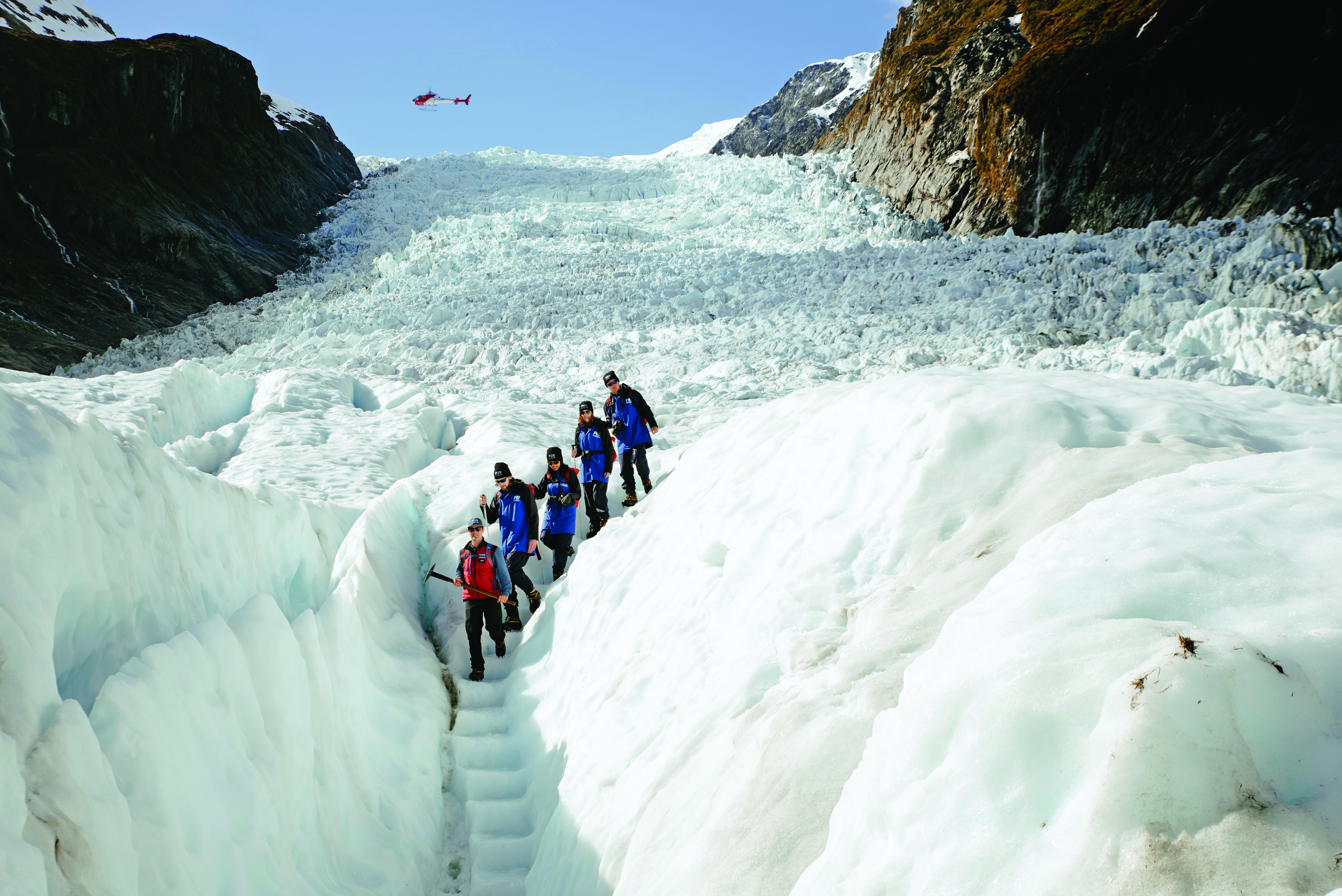
Heli-hiking group on Victoria Flat

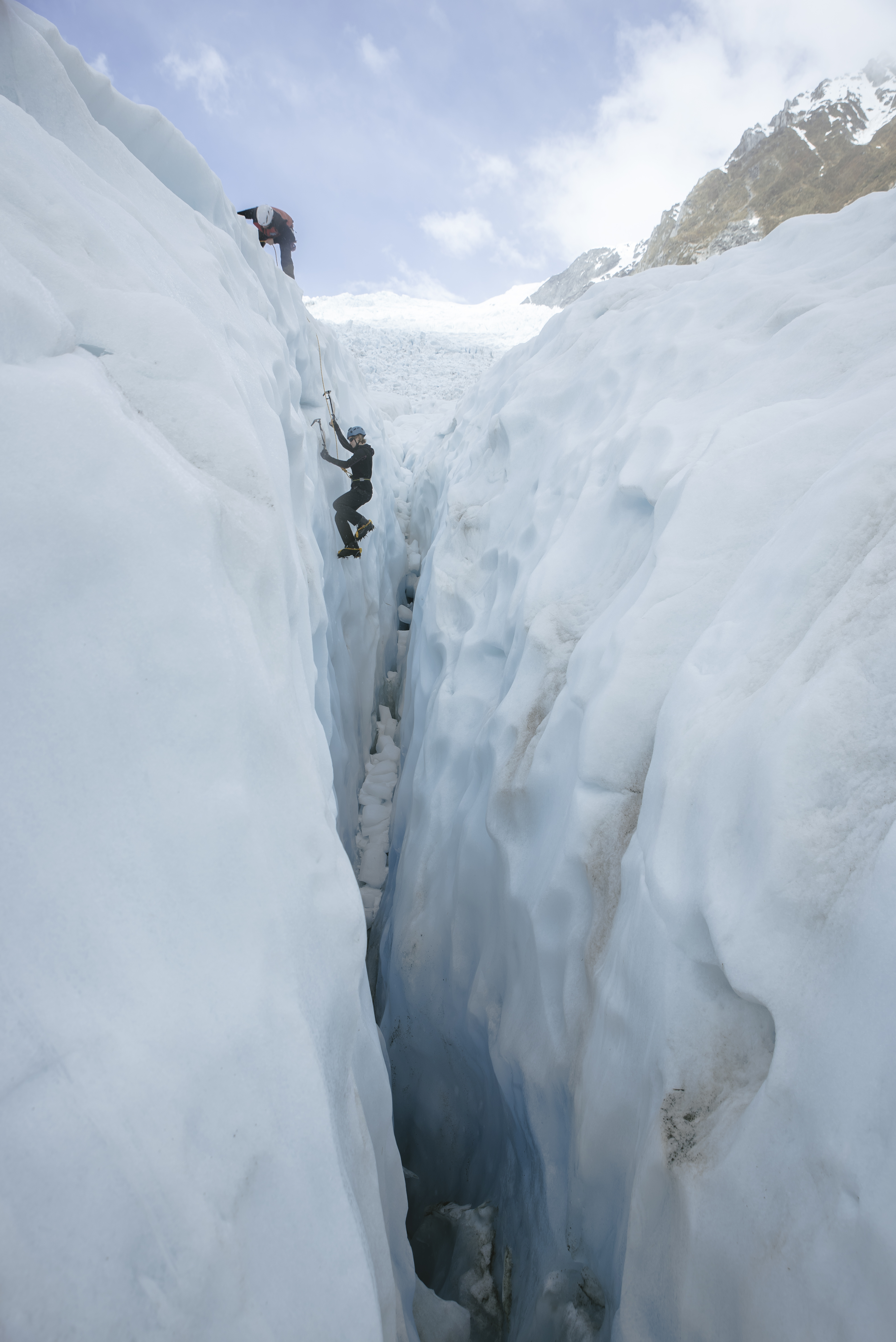
Ice climbing

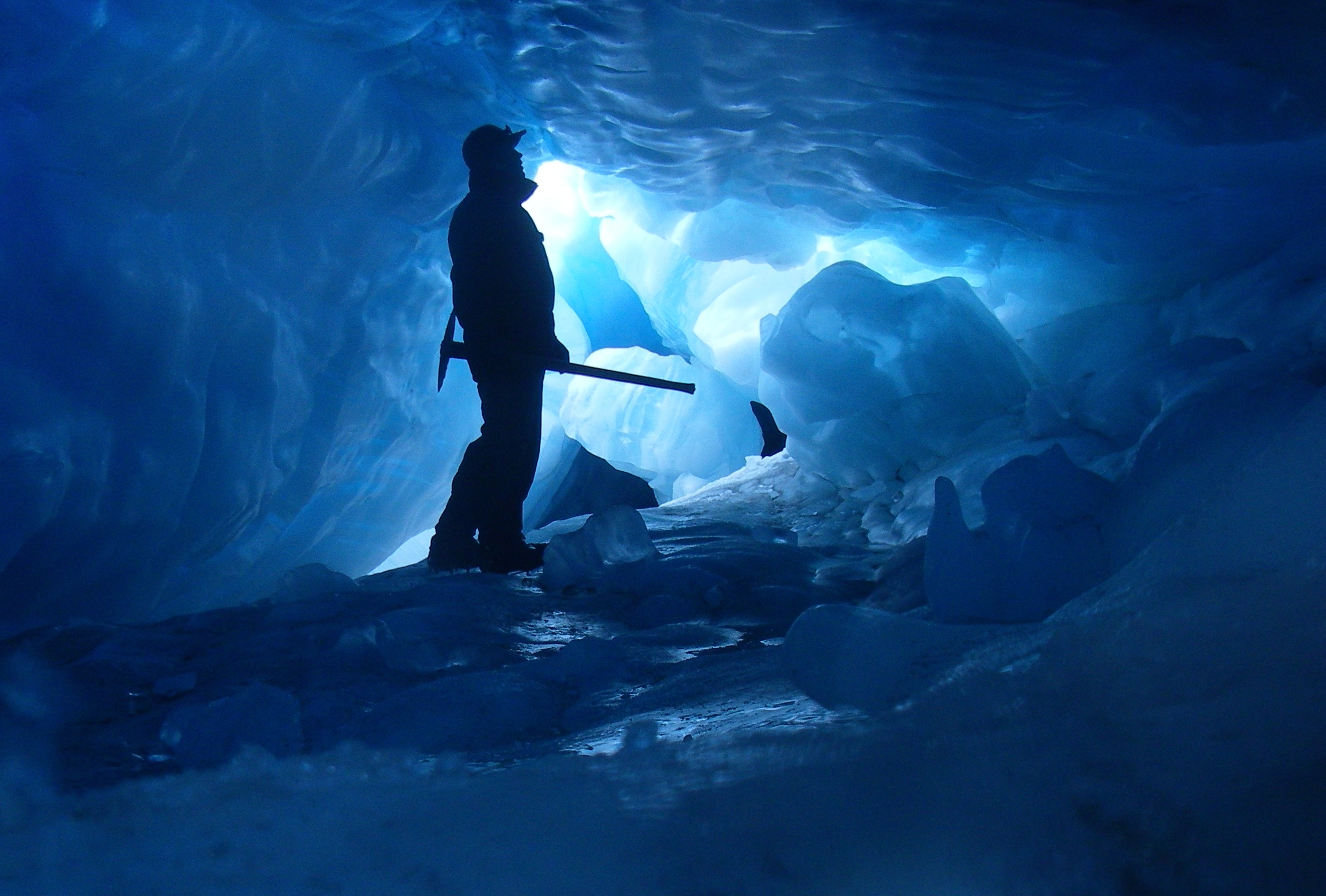
Ice cave on Victoria Flat

== See also ==
- Climate change in New Zealand
- Retreat of glaciers since 1850
- Franz Josef Glacier
