= Clearwater, Washington =

Unincorporated community in Washington, United States

- Unincorporated community
- Location within Washington (state) Location within the United States
- Coordinates: 47°34′40″N 124°17′35″W
- Country: United States
- State: Washington
- County: Jefferson
- Time zone: UTC-8 (Pacific (PST))
  - Summer (DST): UTC-7 (PDT)
- Area code(s): 360, 564

Clearwater is an unincorporated community in western Jefferson County, Washington, United States. Clearwater is located along the Clearwater River and is a primarily timberlands with limited private ownership. The community is just outside the boundaries of the Quinault Indian Reservation.

== History ==
A post office called Clearwater was established in 1895, and remained in operation until 1966. The community takes its name from the nearby Clearwater River.

== Climate ==
The strong influence of the Pacific gives Clearwater heavy year-round precipitation and an Oceanic climate (Cfb), according to the Köppen climate classification system.

Climate data for Clearwater
Month	Jan	Feb	Mar	Apr	May	Jun	Jul	Aug	Sep	Oct	Nov	Dec	Year
Record high °F (°C)	65 (18)	76 (24)	79 (26)	87 (31)	96 (36)	102 (39)	100 (38)	98 (37)	96 (36)	85 (29)	76 (24)	61 (16)	102 (39)
Mean daily maximum °F (°C)	45.3 (7.4)	49.4 (9.7)	52.5 (11.4)	57.1 (13.9)	62 (17)	65.7 (18.7)	70.1 (21.2)	70.6 (21.4)	68.5 (20.3)	60.2 (15.7)	51.2 (10.7)	45.9 (7.7)	58.2 (14.6)
Mean daily minimum °F (°C)	33.9 (1.1)	34.5 (1.4)	35.5 (1.9)	38 (3)	42.1 (5.6)	46.3 (7.9)	49.2 (9.6)	49.2 (9.6)	46.1 (7.8)	42.1 (5.6)	37.9 (3.3)	35.1 (1.7)	40.8 (4.9)
Record low °F (°C)	−8 (−22)	−1 (−18)	15 (−9)	25 (−4)	26 (−3)	31 (−1)	24 (−4)	30 (−1)	27 (−3)	22 (−6)	10 (−12)	4 (−16)	−8 (−22)
Average precipitation inches (mm)	16.78 (426)	13.09 (332)	12.7 (320)	8.81 (224)	5.44 (138)	3.74 (95)	2.36 (60)	2.81 (71)	5.45 (138)	11.23 (285)	17.15 (436)	16.95 (431)	116.51 (2,959)
Average snowfall inches (cm)	3.6 (9.1)	1.6 (4.1)	1.4 (3.6)	0.1 (0.25)	0 (0)	0 (0)	0 (0)	0 (0)	0 (0)	0 (0)	0.1 (0.25)	1.1 (2.8)	7.9 (20)
Average precipitation days	23	19	21	17	14	12	8	8	11	17	22	23	195
