= Clearwater Lake (Ontario) =

Canadian Municipality

- Location within Ontario
- Location: Ontario
- Coordinates: 44.807645°N 79.24266°W
- Basin countries: Canada

Clearwater Lake is a lake in Ontario, Canada, located near Highway 11, north of the town of Orillia in Muskoka. It is adjacent to Washago and Coopers Falls.

The lake has very clear water and a rocky/muddy and sandy bottom that is ideal for swimming and fishing. It is a typical Muskokan style lake with granite rocks protruding out of the water in some areas. Clearwater Lake is accessed by private roads that are maintained by local cottagers' associations. Many cottages and full/part-time residences are present.

== See also ==
- List of lakes of Ontario
