= Shimizu =

Shimizu may refer to:

== People ==
- Shimizu (surname) (清水, "clear" or "pure water"), a common Japanese surname

== Places ==
=== Japan ===
- Shimizu, Fukui -chō, town, Fukui Prefecture
- Shimizu, Shizuoka -chō, town, Shizuoka Prefecture
- Shimizu-ku, Shizuoka, ward of the city of Shizuoka
- Shimizu, Wakayama -chō, town, Wakayama Prefecture
- Shimizu, Hokkaido -chō, town, Hokkaidō
- Tosashimizu, Kōchi, Kōchi Prefecture

=== Other places ===
- Qingshui District, named Shimizu under Japanese rule, district of Taichung, Taiwan

== Other uses ==
- Shimizu S-Pulse, J. League soccer/football team based in Shizuoka
- Shimizu Mega-City Pyramid, a building envisioned for construction in Tokyo
- Shimizu Corporation, an architectural, engineering and general contracting firm
- Shimizu-Tokugawa, a branch of the Tokugawa clan in Japan

== See also ==
- Clearwater (disambiguation), an English equivalent
- Clear River (disambiguation), an English equivalent
- Qingshui (disambiguation), the Chinese equivalent
- Shimizu Station (disambiguation)
