= Clearwater Lake (Wisconsin) =

- Location within Wisconsin Location within the United States
- Location: Cassian, Wisconsin
- Coordinates: 45.850457°N 89.200192°W
- Type: lake
- Surface elevation: 1,627 feet (496 m)

Clearwater Lake is a 360-acre lake located in the town of Cassian, Oneida County, Wisconsin, United States. Clearwater Lake is a private lake that is a part of the Clearwater Lake development.
