= Qingshui =

- Chinese: 清水
- Literal meaning: Clear Water; Clear River
Transcriptions
Standard Mandarin
- Hanyu Pinyin: Qīngshuǐ
- Wade–Giles: Ch‘ing Shui

Qingshui may refer to:

== Rivers ==
- Qingshui River (Guizhou), China, a tributary of the Wu River
- Qingshui River (Qingshai), China
- Qingshui River (Zhangjiakou), a river in Zhangjiakou, China
- Qingshui (Shanxi), China, draining Mount Wutai
- Qingshui River (Taiwan), Taiwan, a tributary of the Lanyang River

== Regions ==
- Qingshui District, district in Taichung City, Taiwan
- Qingshui County, county in Tianshui Prefecture, Gansu, China

== Settlements ==
- Qingshui, Beijing, Mentougou District, China
- Qingshui, Jiuquan, Gansu, China
- Qingshui, Renshou County, Sichuan, China
- Qingshui, Dachu County, Sichuan, China
- Qingshui, Guan County, Shandong, China
- Qingshui, Dawa County, Liaoning, China

== People ==
- Qingshui (monk), Chan Buddhist monk during the Song dynasty

== Other ==
- Qingshui Cliff, in Hualien County, Taiwan

== See also ==
- Clearwater (disambiguation), an English equivalent
- Clear River (disambiguation), an English equivalent
- Shimizu (disambiguation), the Japanese equivalent
