= Wakae-Iwata Station =

Railway station in Higashiōsaka, Osaka Prefecture, Japan

Wakae-Iwata Station 若江岩田駅
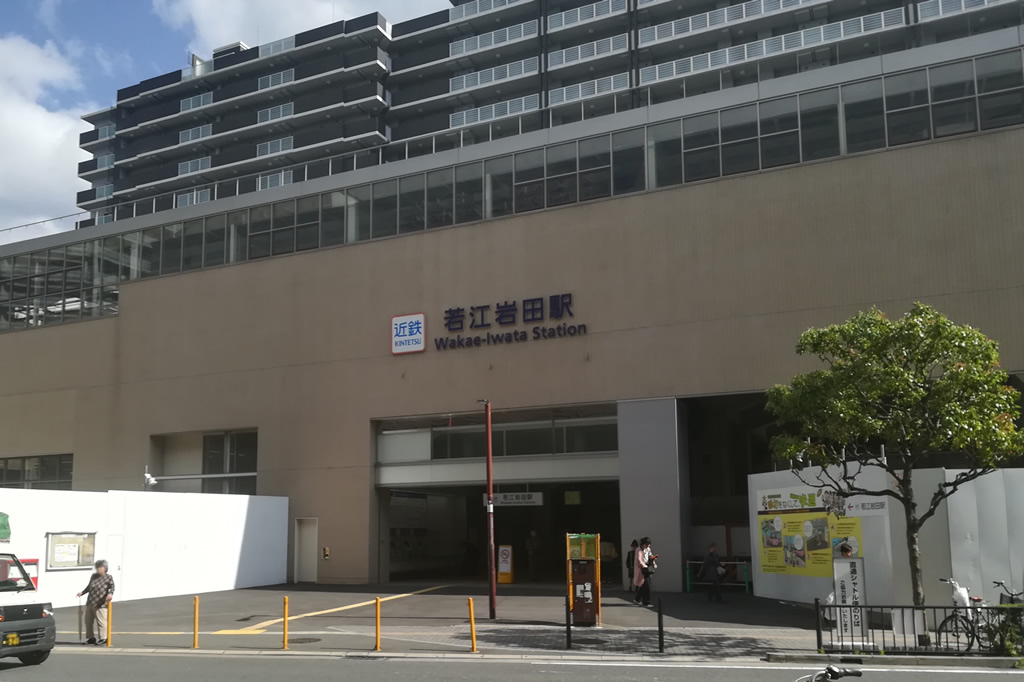
- Wakae-Iwata Station in May 2018

General information
- Location: 4-4-21 Iwatacho, Higashiōsaka City, Osaka Prefecture （大阪府東大阪市岩田町四丁目4-21） Japan
- Coordinates: 34°39′47″N 135°36′28″E
- Operator: Kintetsu Railway
- Line: Nara Line
- Distance: 4.1 km from Fuse
- Platforms: 2 side platforms
- Connections

Other information
- Station code: A10
- Website: Official website

History
- Opened: April 30, 1914
- Former names: Wakae (to 1925)

Passengers
- FY2018: 15,832 daily

Services
Preceding station	Kintetsu Railway	Following station
Yaenosato towards Ōsaka Uehommachi	Nara Line Local	Kawachi-Hanazono towards Kintetsu Nara
Location
- Location within Osaka Prefecture Location within Japan

Wakae-Iwata Station (若江岩田駅, Wakae-Iwata-eki; station number: A10) is a passenger railway station in located in the city of Higashiōsaka, Osaka Prefecture, Japan, operated by the private railway operator Kintetsu Railway.

== Lines ==
Wakae-Iwata Station is served by the Nara Line, and is located 4.1 rail kilometers from the starting point of the line at Fuse Station and 10.2 kilometers from Ōsaka Namba Station.

== Station layout ==
The station consists of two opposed elevated side platforms, with the station building underneath.

=== Platforms ===
1	■ Nara Line	for Higashi-Hanazono, Ikoma, Yamato-Saidaiji, Nara and Tenri
2	■ Nara Line	for Fuse, Ōsaka Uehommachi, Ōsaka Namba and Amagasaki

== History ==
Wakae-Iwata Station opened on April 30, 1914 as Wakae Station (若江駅) on the Osaka Electric Tramway. It was renamed to its present name in 1925. In 1941 it was transferred to the Kansai Kyūkō Railway, which became part of Kintetsu in 1944.

== Passenger statistics ==
In fiscal 2018, the station was used by an average of 15,832 passengers daily.

== Surrounding area ==
- Wakaeiwata Ekimae Urban Redevelopment Building

== See also ==
- List of railway stations in Japan
