= Yaenosato Station =

Railway station in Higashiōsaka, Osaka Prefecture, Japan

Yaenosato Station 八戸ノ里駅
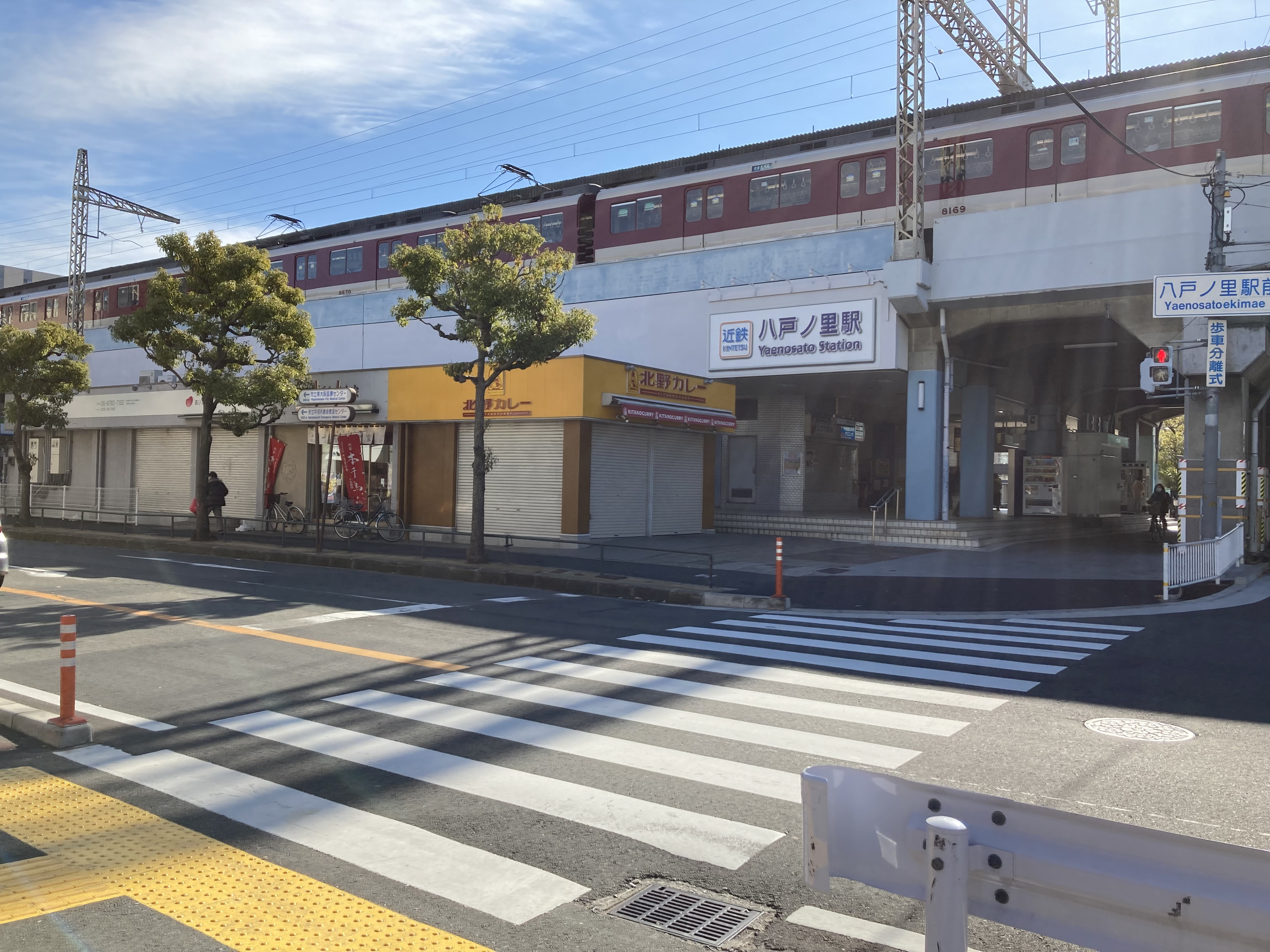
- Yaenosato Station North entrance

General information
- Location: 3-1-1 Kosaka, Higashiōsaka City, Osaka Prefecture （大阪府東大阪市小阪三丁目1-1） Japan
- Coordinates: 34°39′49.23″N 135°35′22.38″E
- Operator: Kintetsu Railway
- Line: Nara Line
- Distance: 2.4 km from Fuse
- Platforms: 2 island platforms
- Connections

Other information
- Station code: A09
- Website: Official website

History
- Opened: November 19, 1936

Passengers
- FY2018: 27,151 daily

Services
Preceding station	Kintetsu Railway	Following station
Kawachi-Kosaka towards Ōsaka Uehommachi	Nara Line Local	Wakae-Iwata towards Kintetsu Nara
Location
- Location within Osaka Prefecture Location within Japan

Yaenosato Station (八戸ノ里駅, Yaenosato-eki; station number: A09) is a passenger railway station in located in the city of Higashiōsaka, Osaka Prefecture, Japan, operated by the private railway operator Kintetsu Railway.

== Lines ==
Yaenosato Station is served by the Nara Line, and is located 2.4 rail kilometers from the starting point of the line at Fuse Station and 8.5 kilometers from Ōsaka Namba Station.

== Station layout ==
The station consists of two elevated island platforms, with the station building underneath.

=== Platforms ===
1, 2	■ Nara Line	for Higashi-Hanazono, Ikoma, Yamato-Saidaiji, Nara and Tenri
3, 4	■ Nara Line	for Fuse, Ōsaka Uehommachi, Ōsaka Namba and Amagasaki

== History ==
Yaenosato Station opened on November 19, 1936 as a station of Osaka Electric Tramway. In 1941 it was transferred to the Kansai Kyūkō Railway, which became part of Kintetsu in 1944.

== Passenger statistics ==
In fiscal 2018, the station was used by an average of 27,151 passengers daily.

== Surrounding area ==
- Municipal Higashi Osaka Medical Center
- Osaka Prefectural Nakagawachi Emergency and Critical Care Center
- Higashi Osaka Labor Standards Inspection Office
- Higashi Osaka City Waterworks Bureau

== See also ==
- List of railway stations in Japan
