= Nukata Station =

Railway station in Higashiōsaka, Osaka Prefecture, Japan

Nukata Station 額田駅
- Nukata Station West entrance

General information
- Location: 2-10 Yamatecho, Higashiōsaka City, Osaka Prefecture （大阪府東大阪市山手町2-10） Japan
- Coordinates: 34°40′32″N 135°39′05″E
- Operator: Kintetsu Railway
- Line: Nara Line
- Distance: 9.0 km from Fuse
- Platforms: 2 side platforms
- Connections

Other information
- Station code: A15
- Website: Official website

History
- Opened: July 13, 1920

Passengers
- FY2018: 3,490 daily

Services
| Preceding station | Kintetsu Railway | Following station |
|---|---|---|
| Hiraoka towards Ōsaka Uehommachi | Nara Line Local Suburban Semi-Express | Ishikiri towards Kintetsu Nara |
Location
- Location within Osaka Prefecture Location within Japan

East entrance

Nukata Station (額田駅, Nukata-eki; station number: A15) is a passenger railway station in located in the city of Higashiōsaka, Osaka Prefecture, Japan, operated by the private railway operator Kintetsu Railway.

== Lines ==
Nukata Station is served by the Nara Line, and is located 9.0 rail kilometers from the starting point of the line at Fuse Station and 15.1 kilometers from Ōsaka Namba Station.

== Station layout ==
The station consists of two opposed side platforms, which are not interconnected. Passengers wishing to change platforms must exit the station and re-enter from the other side.

=== Platforms ===
| 1 | ■ Nara Line | for Ikoma, Yamato-Saidaiji, Nara and Tenri |
| 2 | ■ Nara Line | for Fuse, Ōsaka Uehommachi, Ōsaka Namba and Amagasaki |

== History ==
Nukata Station opened on July 13, 1920 as a station of Osaka Electric Tramway. In 1941 it was transferred to the Kansai Kyūkō Railway, which became part of Kintetsu in 1944.

== Passenger statistics ==
In fiscal 2018, the station was used by an average of 3,490 passengers daily.

== Surrounding area ==
- Nakuda Sanso
- Hiraoka Park
- Myotoku-ji
- Higashi Osaka Municipal Hiraoka Higashi Elementary School

== See also ==
- List of railway stations in Japan
