= Kawachi-Kosaka Station =

Railway station in Higashiōsaka, Osaka Prefecture, Japan

Kawachi-Kosaka Station 河内小阪駅
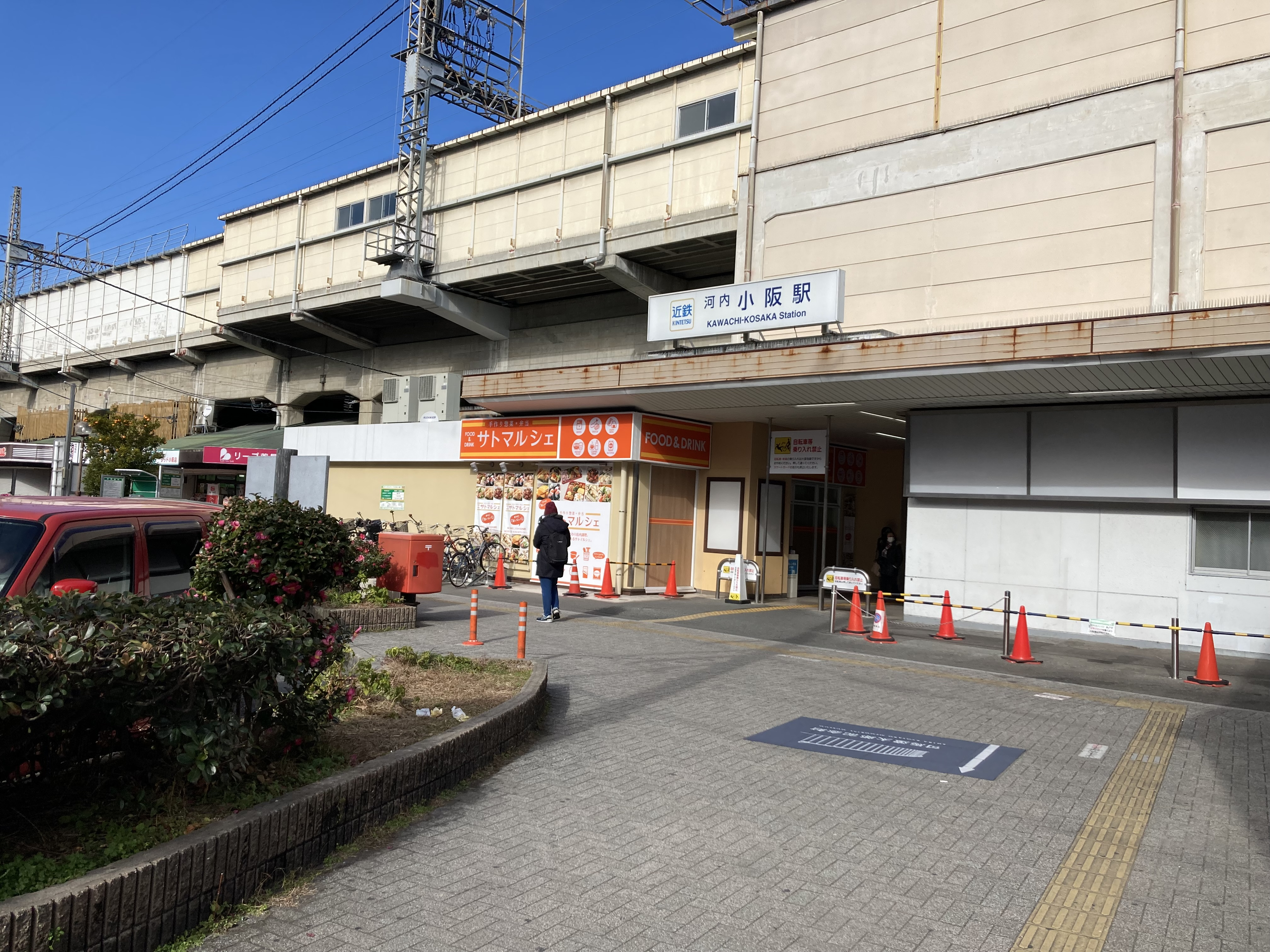
- Kawachi-Kosaka Station South entrance

General information
- Location: 1-8-8 Kosaka, Higashiōsaka City, Osaka Prefecture （大阪府東大阪市小阪一丁目8-8） Japan
- Coordinates: 34°39′51″N 135°34′53″E
- Operator: Kintetsu Railway
- Line: Nara Line
- Distance: 1.6 km from Fuse
- Platforms: 2 side platform
- Connections

Other information
- Station code: A08
- Website: Official website

History
- Opened: July 13, 1920

Passengers
- FY2018: 26,959 daily
Location
- Location within Osaka Prefecture Location within Japan

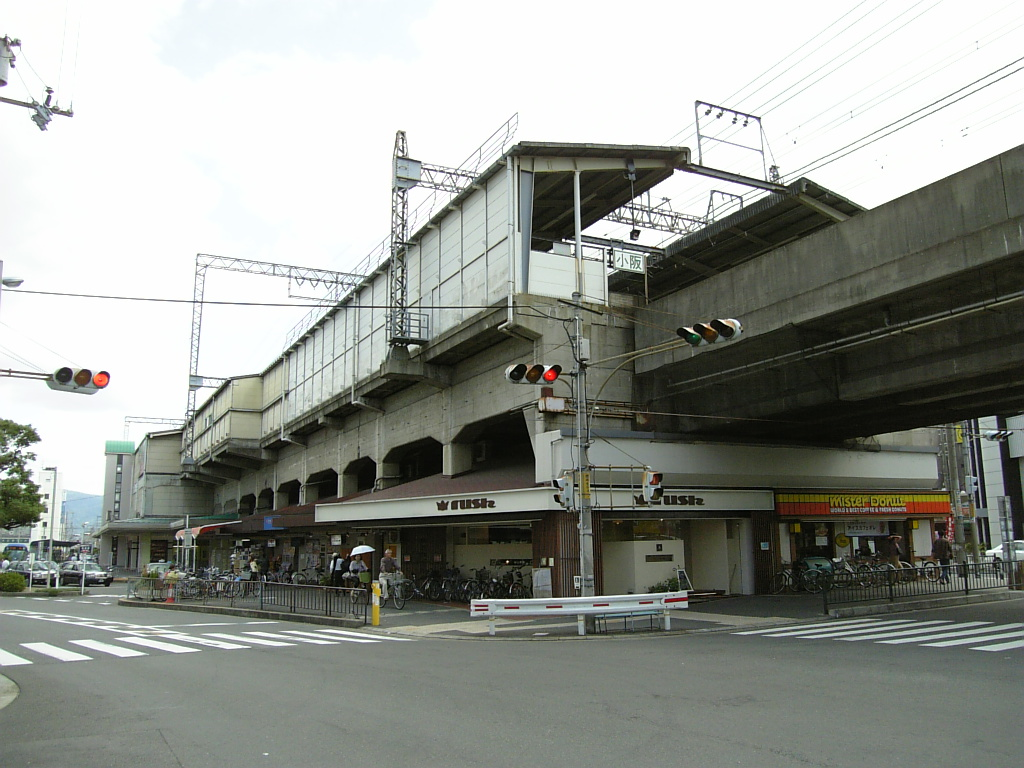
Kawachi-Kosaka Station

Kawachi-Kosaka Station (河内小阪駅, Kawachi-Kosaka-eki; station number: A08) is a passenger railway station in located in the city of Higashiōsaka, Osaka Prefecture, Japan, operated by the private railway operator Kintetsu Railway.

== Lines ==
Kawachi-Kosaka Station is served by the Nara Line, and is located 1.6 rail kilometers from the starting point of the line at Fuse Station and 7.7 kilometers from Ōsaka Namba Station.

== Station layout ==
The station consists of two opposed elevated side platforms, with the station building underneath.

=== Platforms ===
1	■ Nara Line	for Higashi-Hanazono, Ikoma, Yamato-Saidaiji, Nara and Tenri
2	■ Nara Line	for Fuse, Ōsaka Uehommachi, Ōsaka Namba and Amagasaki

== Adjacent stations ==
«	Service	»
Nara Line (A08)
Kawachi-Eiwa (A07)	Local	Yaenosato (A09)
Fuse (A06)	Semi-Express; Suburban Semi-Express	Higashi-Hanazono (A12)
Express: Does not stop at this station
Rapid Express: Does not stop at this station
Limited Express: Does not stop at this station

== History ==
Kawachi-Kosaka Station opened on April 30, 1914, as Kosaka Station (小阪駅) on the Osaka Electric Tramway. It was renamed Daiki Kosaka Station (大軌小阪駅) in August 1928 and its present name on March 15, 1941. In 1941 it was transferred to the Kansai Kyūkō Railway, which became part of Kintetsu in 1944.

== Passenger statistics ==
In fiscal 2018, the station was used by an average of 26,959 passengers daily.

== Surrounding area ==
- Kinki University (Headquarters Campus)
- Shiba Ryotaro Memorial Hall
- Osaka Shoin Women's University
- Osaka University of Commerce

== See also ==
- List of railway stations in Japan
