= Hyōtan-yama Station (Osaka) =

Railway station in Higashiōsaka, Osaka Prefecture, Japan

Hyōtan-yama Station 瓢簞山駅
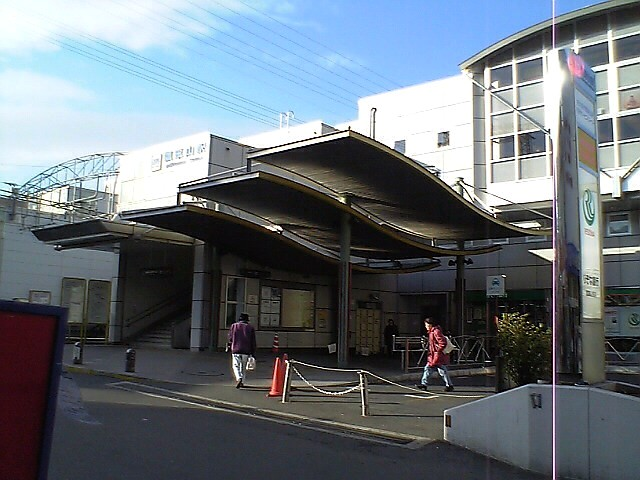
- Hyōtan-yama Station, north exit

General information
- Location: 4-1, Showacho, Higashiōsaka City, Osaka Prefecture （大阪府東大阪市昭和町4-1） Japan
- Coordinates: 34°39′43.66″N 135°38′23.12″E
- Operator: Kintetsu Railway
- Line: Nara Line
- Distance: 7.0 km from Fuse
- Platforms: 2 side platforms
- Connections

Other information
- Station code: A13
- Website: Official website

History
- Opened: April 30, 1914

Passengers
- FY2018: 21,783 daily

Services
| Preceding station | Kintetsu Railway | Following station |
|---|---|---|
| Higashi-Hanazono A12 towards Ōsaka Uehommachi | Nara Line Local Suburban Semi-Express | Hiraoka A14 towards Kintetsu Nara |
Location
- Location within Osaka Prefecture Location within Japan

Hyōtan-yama Station (瓢簞山駅, Hyōtan'yama-ekii; station number: A13) is a passenger railway station located in the city of Higashiōsaka, Osaka Prefecture, Japan, operated by the private railway operator Kintetsu Railway.

== Lines ==
Hyōtan-yama Station is served by the Nara Line, and is located 7.0 rail kilometers from the starting point of the line at Fuse Station and 13.1 kilometers from Ōsaka Namba Station.

== Station layout ==
The station consists of two opposed side platforms, connected by an elevated station building.

=== Platforms ===
| 1 | ■ Nara Line | for Ikoma, Yamato-Saidaiji, Nara and Tenri |
| 4 | ■ Nara Line | for Fuse, Ōsaka Uehommachi, Ōsaka Namba and Amagasaki |

== History ==
Hyōtan-yama Station opened on April 30, 1914 as a station of Osaka Electric Tramway. In 1941 it was transferred to the Kansai Kyūkō Railway, which became part of Kintetsu in 1944.

== Passenger statistics ==
In fiscal 2018, the station was used by an average of 21,783 passengers daily.

== Surrounding area ==
- Osaka Prefectural Hiraoka Hirafu High School
- Higashi Osaka Municipal Nawate Kita Elementary School
- Higashi Osaka City Asahimachi Government Building

== See also ==
- List of railway stations in Japan
