= Kawachi-Hanazono Station =

Railway station in Higashiōsaka, Osaka Prefecture, Japan

Kawachi-Hanazono Station 河内花園駅
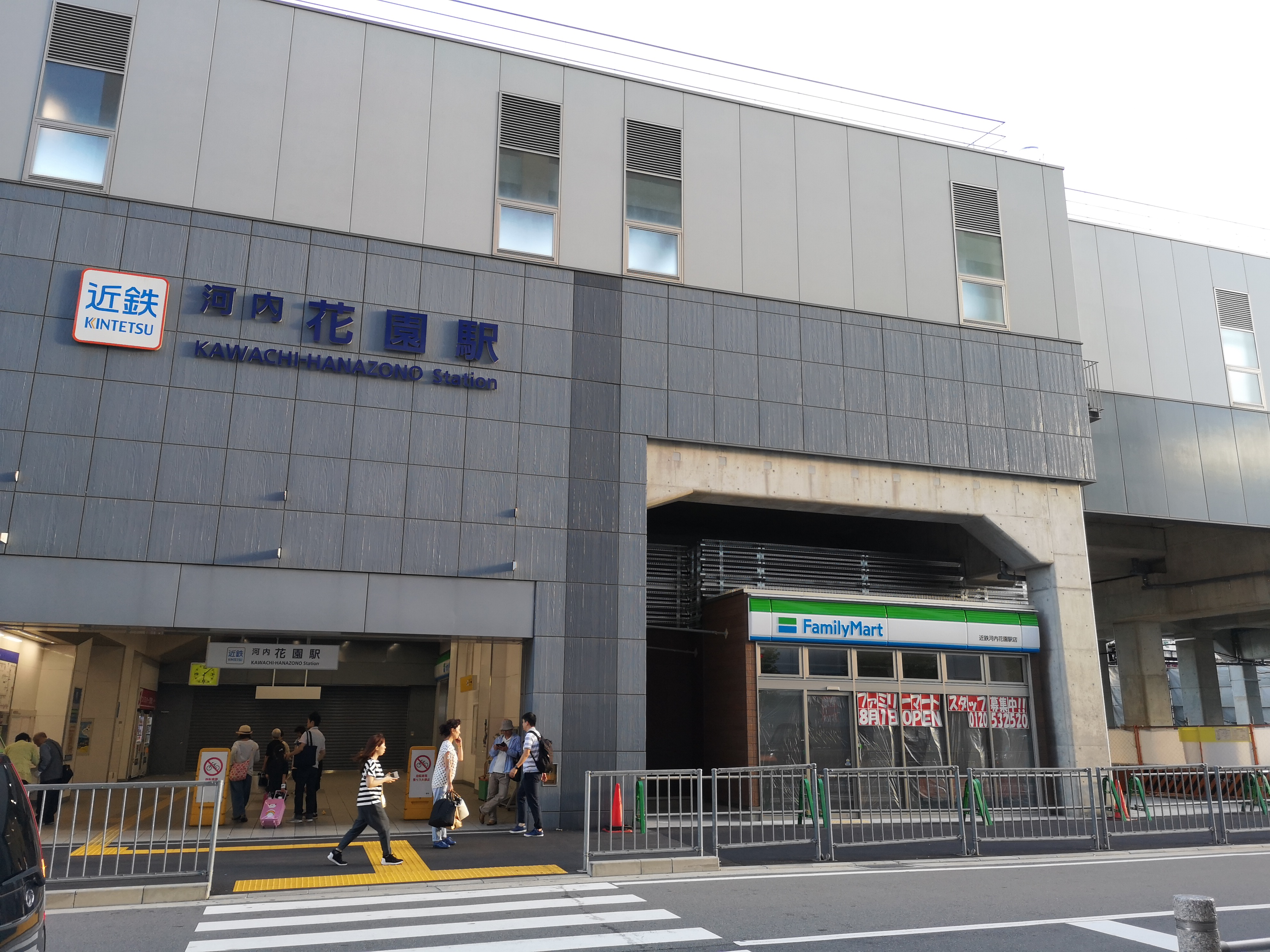
- Kawachi-Hanazono Station South entrance

General information
- Location: 1-13-13 Yoshita, Higashiōsaka City, Osaka Prefecture （大阪府東大阪市吉田一丁目13-13） Japan
- Coordinates: 34°39′46″N 135°37′06″E
- Operator: Kintetsu Railway
- Line: Nara Line
- Distance: 5.0 km from Fuse
- Platforms: 2 side platforms
- Connections

Other information
- Station code: A11
- Website: Official website

History
- Opened: June 15, 1915

Passengers
- FY2018: 10,987 daily

Services
Preceding station	Kintetsu Railway	Following station
Wakae-Iwata towards Ōsaka Uehommachi	Nara Line Local	Higashi-Hanazono towards Kintetsu Nara
Location
- Location within Osaka Prefecture Location within Japan

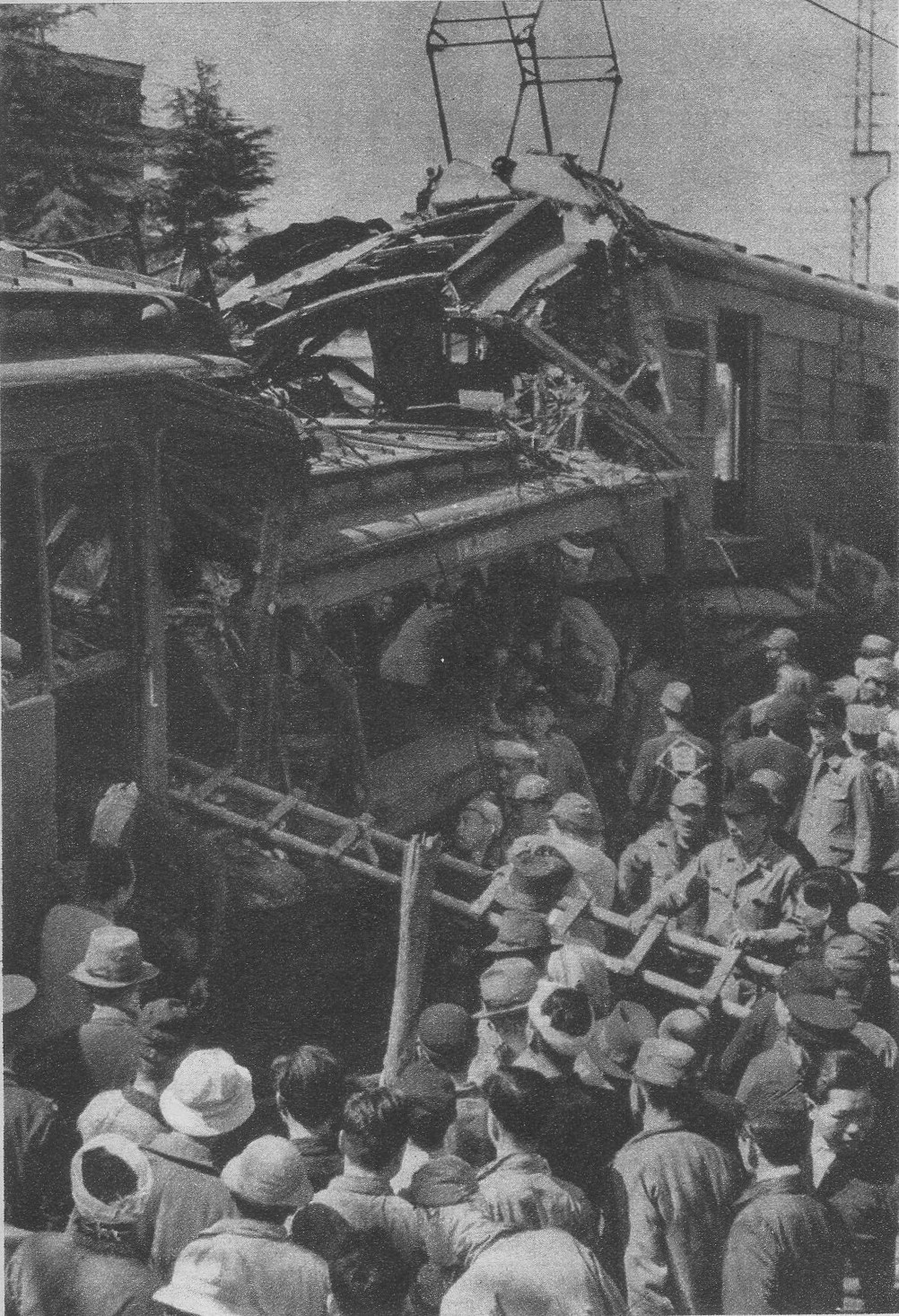
1948 train collision accident.

Kawachi-Hanazono Station (河内花園駅, Kawachi-Hanazono-eki; station number: A11) is a passenger railway station in located in the city of Higashiōsaka, Osaka Prefecture, Japan, operated by the private railway operator Kintetsu Railway.

== Lines ==
Kawachi-Hanazono Station is served by the Nara Line, and is located 5.0 rail kilometers from the starting point of the line at Fuse Station and 11.1 kilometers from Ōsaka Namba Station.

== Station layout ==
The station consists of two opposed elevated side platforms, with the station building located underneath.

=== Platforms ===
1	■ Nara Line	for Higashi-Hanazono, Ikoma, Yamato-Saidaiji, Nara and Tenri
2	■ Nara Line	for Fuse, Ōsaka Uehommachi, Ōsaka Namba and Amagasaki

== History ==
Kawachi-Hanazono Station opened on June 15, 1915 as Hanazono Station (花園駅) on the Osaka Electric Tramway. It was renamed Daiki Hanazono Station (大軌花園駅) in December 1932. In 1941 it was transferred to the Kansai Kyūkō Railway, which became part of Kintetsu in 1944. On March 31, 1948 because of a brake failure of an express train for Uehommachi in the Ikoma tunnel, the train crashed with a local train at this station, killing 49.

== Passenger statistics ==
In fiscal 2018, the station was used by an average of 10,987 passengers daily.

== Surrounding area ==
- Yoshida Kasuga Shrine (Rugby Shrine)
- Osaka Prefectural Tamagawa High School

== See also ==
- List of railway stations in Japan
