= Kawachi-Eiwa Station =

Railway station in Higashiōsaka, Osaka Prefecture, Japan

Kawachi-Eiwa Station 河内永和駅
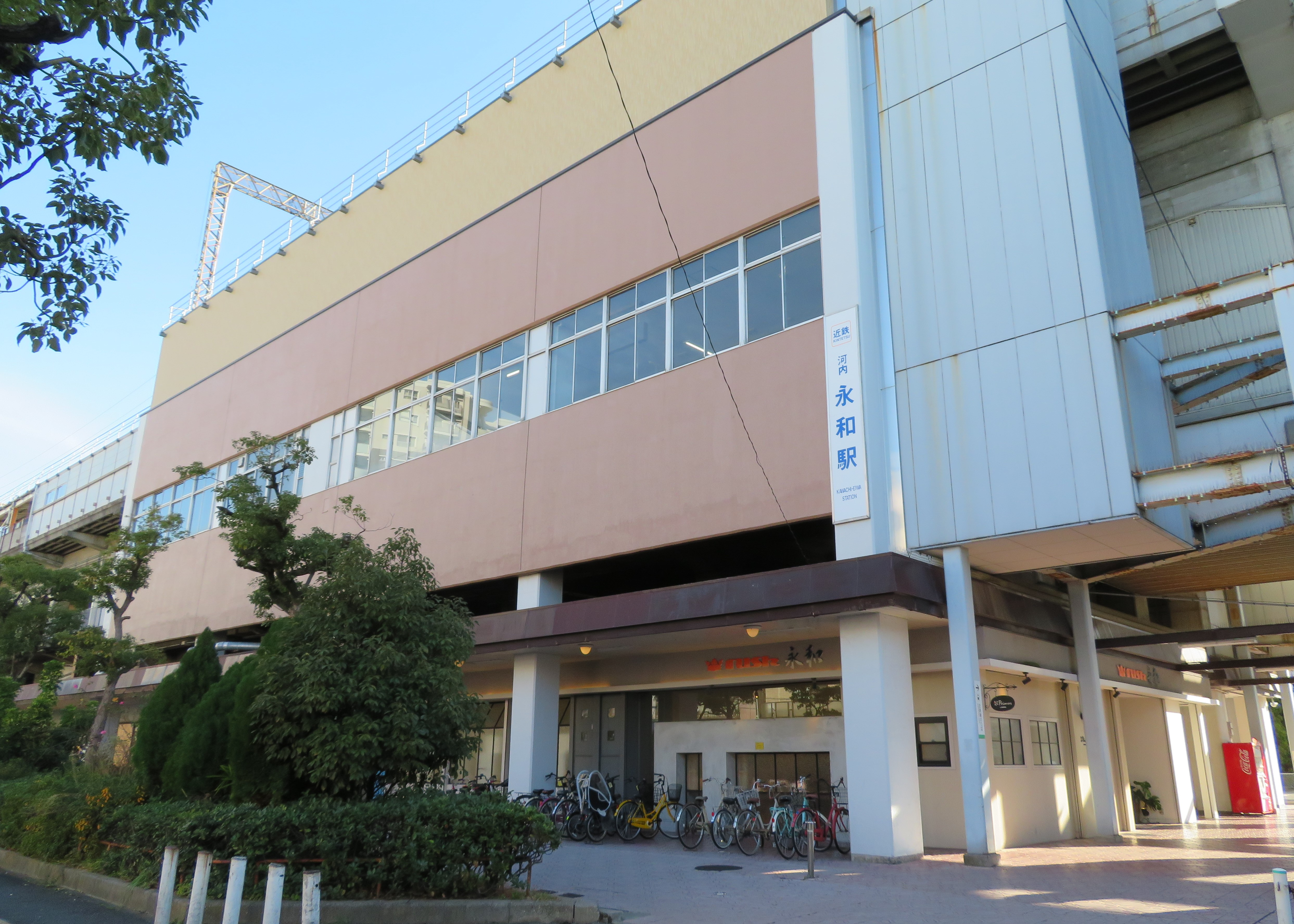
- Kintetsu Kawachi-Eiwa Station, January 2020

General information
- Location: 1-1-5 Takaida Motomachi, Higashiōsaka City, Osaka Prefecture （大阪府東大阪市高井田元町一丁目1-5） Japan
- Coordinates: 34°39′52″N 135°34′22″E
- Operator: Kintetsu Railway
- Line: Nara Line
- Distance: 0.8 km from Fuse
- Platforms: 2 side platforms
- Connections

Other information
- Station code: A07
- Website: Official website

History
- Opened: August 1, 1936

Passengers
- FY2018: 10,987 daily

Services
Preceding station	Kintetsu Railway	Following station
Fuse towards Ōsaka Uehommachi	Nara Line Local	Kawachi-Kosaka towards Kintetsu Nara
Location
- Location within Osaka Prefecture Location within Japan

Kawachi-Eiwa Station (河内永和駅, Kawachi-Eiwa-eki; station number: A07) is a passenger railway station in located in the city of Higashiōsaka, Osaka Prefecture, Japan, operated by the private railway operator Kintetsu Railway. It is perpendicular to, but not connected with, the JR West JR-Kawachi-Eiwa Station.

== Lines ==
Kawachi-Eiwa Station is served by the Nara Line, and is located 0.8 rail kilometers from the starting point of the line at Fuse Station and 6.9 kilometers from Ōsaka Namba Station.

== Station layout ==
The station consists of two opposed elevated side platforms, with the station building underneath.

=== Platforms ===
1	■ Nara Line	for Higashi-Hanazono, Ikoma, Yamato-Saidaiji, Nara and Tenri
2	■ Nara Line	for Fuse, Ōsaka Uehommachi, Ōsaka Namba and Amagasaki

== History ==
Kawachi-Eiwa Station opened on August 1, 1936 as Hitonomichi Station (人ノ道駅) on the Osaka Electric Tramway. The station was closed on April 22, 1937 and reopened as Daiki Eiwa Station (大軌永和駅) of February 1, 1938. It was renamed to its present name on March 15, 1941. In 1941 it was transferred to the Kansai Kyūkō Railway, which became part of Kintetsu in 1944.

== Passenger statistics ==
In fiscal 2018, the station was used by an average of 10,987 passengers daily.

== Surrounding area ==
- Higashi Osaka Legal Joint Government Building
- Higashi Osaka Ward Prosecutor's Office
- Osaka Legal Affairs Bureau Higashi Osaka Branch
- Higashi Osaka Simple Court
- Higashi Osaka Tax Office

== See also ==
- List of railway stations in Japan
