= Imazato Station (Kintetsu) =

Railway station in Osaka, Japan

Coordinates: 34°39′53.09″N 135°32′59.72″E

Imazato Station 今里駅
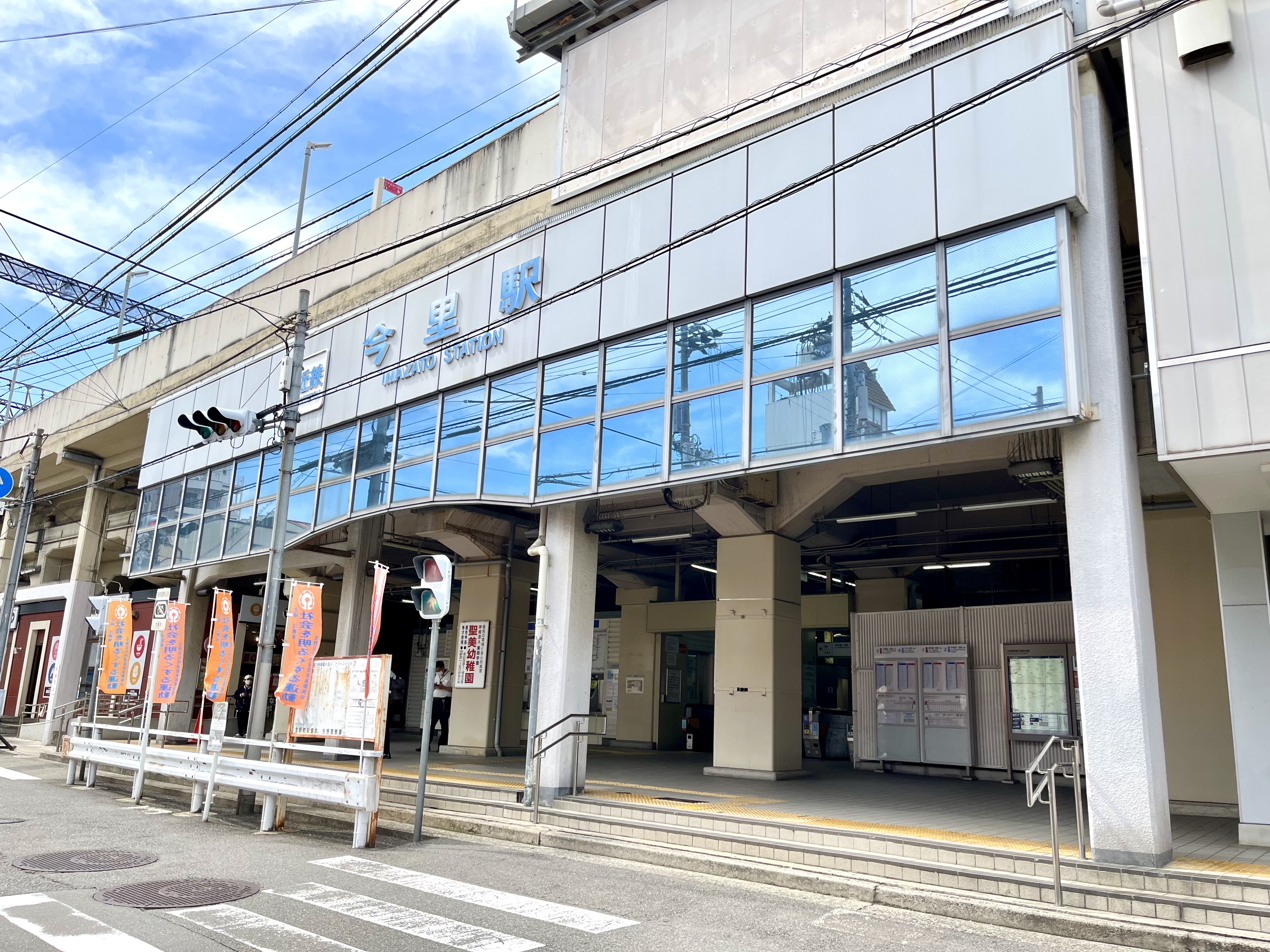

General information
- Location: 4-1-17, Shinimazato, Ikuno Ward, Osaka City, Osaka Prefecture （大阪府大阪市生野区新今里4丁目1-17） Japan
- Operator: Kintetsu Railway
- Lines: A Nara Line; D Osaka Line

Other information
- Station code: A05; D05

History
- Opened: 30 April 1914
Location

Imazato Station (今里駅) is a railway station on Kintetsu Railway's Osaka Line in Ikuno-ku, Osaka, Japan.

== Lines ==
- Kintetsu Railway
  - Osaka Line (D05)
  - Nara Line (A05)

== Layout ==
This station has an island platform serving two tracks between two side platforms serving two tracks elevated.

1	■ Nara Line	for Higashi-Hanazono, Ikoma, Yamato-Saidaiji, Nara and Tenri
2	■ Osaka Line	for Kawachi-Kokubu and Yamato-Yagi
3	■ Nara Line	for Tsuruhashi, Ōsaka Uehommachi, Ōsaka Namba, Amagasaki, Kōshien and Kōbe Sannomiya
4	■ Osaka Line	for Tsuruhashi and Ōsaka Uehommachi

== Adjacent stations ==
«	Service	»
Kintetsu
Osaka Line (D05)
Nara Line (A05)
Tsuruhashi (A04/D04)	Local	Fuse (A06/D06)
Suburban Semi-Express: Does not stop at this station
Semi-Express: Does not stop at this station
Express: Does not stop at this station
Rapid Express: Does not stop at this station
