= Hiraoka Station (Osaka) =

Railway station in Higashiōsaka, Osaka Prefecture, Japan

Hiraoka Station 枚岡駅
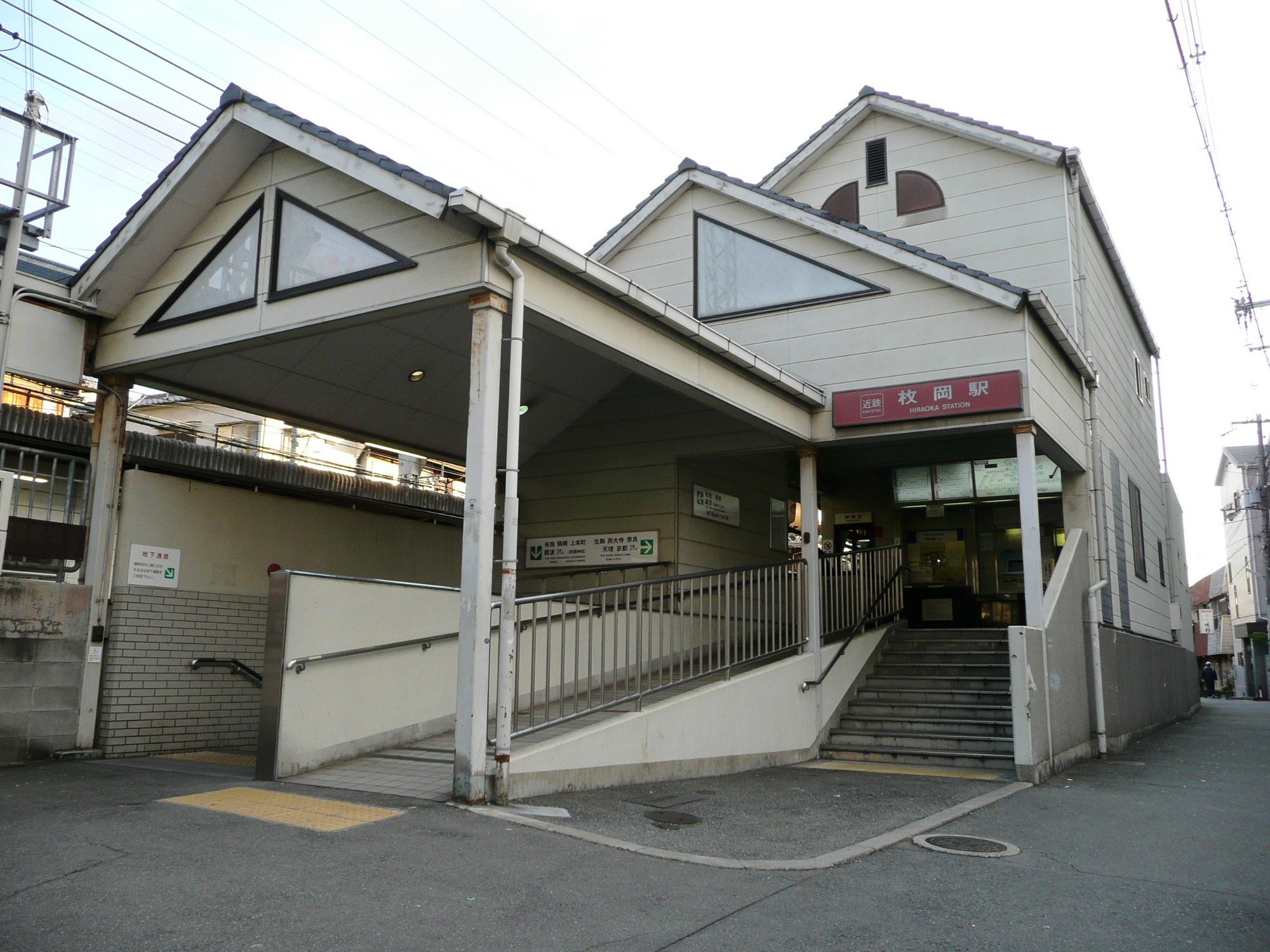
- Hiraoka Station west entrance

General information
- Location: 2-6, Izumoi-cho, Higashiōsaka City, Osaka Prefecture （大阪府東大阪市出雲井町2-6） Japan
- Coordinates: 34°40′12″N 135°38′53″E
- Operator: Kintetsu Railway
- Line: Nara Line
- Distance: 8.3 km from Fuse
- Platforms: 2 side platforms
- Connections

Other information
- Station code: A14
- Website: Official website

History
- Opened: April 30, 1914

Passengers
- FY2018: 4,799 daily

Services
Preceding station	Kintetsu Railway	Following station
Hyōtan-yama towards Ōsaka Uehommachi	Nara Line Local Suburban Semi-Express	Nukata towards Kintetsu Nara
Location
- Location within Osaka Prefecture Location within Japan

Hiraoka Station (枚岡駅, Hiraoka-eki; station number: A14) is a passenger railway station in located in the city of Higashiōsaka, Osaka Prefecture, Japan, operated by the private railway operator Kintetsu Railway.

== Lines ==
Hiroaka Station is served by the Nara Line, and is located 8.3 rail kilometers from the starting point of the line at Fuse Station and 14.4 kilometers from Ōsaka Namba Station.

== Station layout ==
The station consists of two opposed side platforms, which are not interconnected. Passengers wishing to change platforms must exit the station and re-enter from the other side.

=== Platforms ===
1	■ Nara Line	for Ikoma, Yamato-Saidaiji, Nara and Tenri
2	■ Nara Line	for Fuse, Tsuruhashi, Ōsaka Namba and Amagasaki

== History ==
Hiraoka Station opened on April 30, 1914, as a station of Osaka Electric Tramway. In 1941 it was transferred to the Kansai Kyūkō Railway, which became part of Kintetsu in 1944.

== Passenger statistics ==
In fiscal 2018, the station was used by an average of 4,799 passengers daily.

== Surrounding area ==
- Hiraoka Shrine
- National Route 308

== See also ==
- List of railway stations in Japan
