= Ishikiri Station =

Railway station in Higashiōsaka, Osaka Prefecture, Japan

Ishikiri Station 石切駅
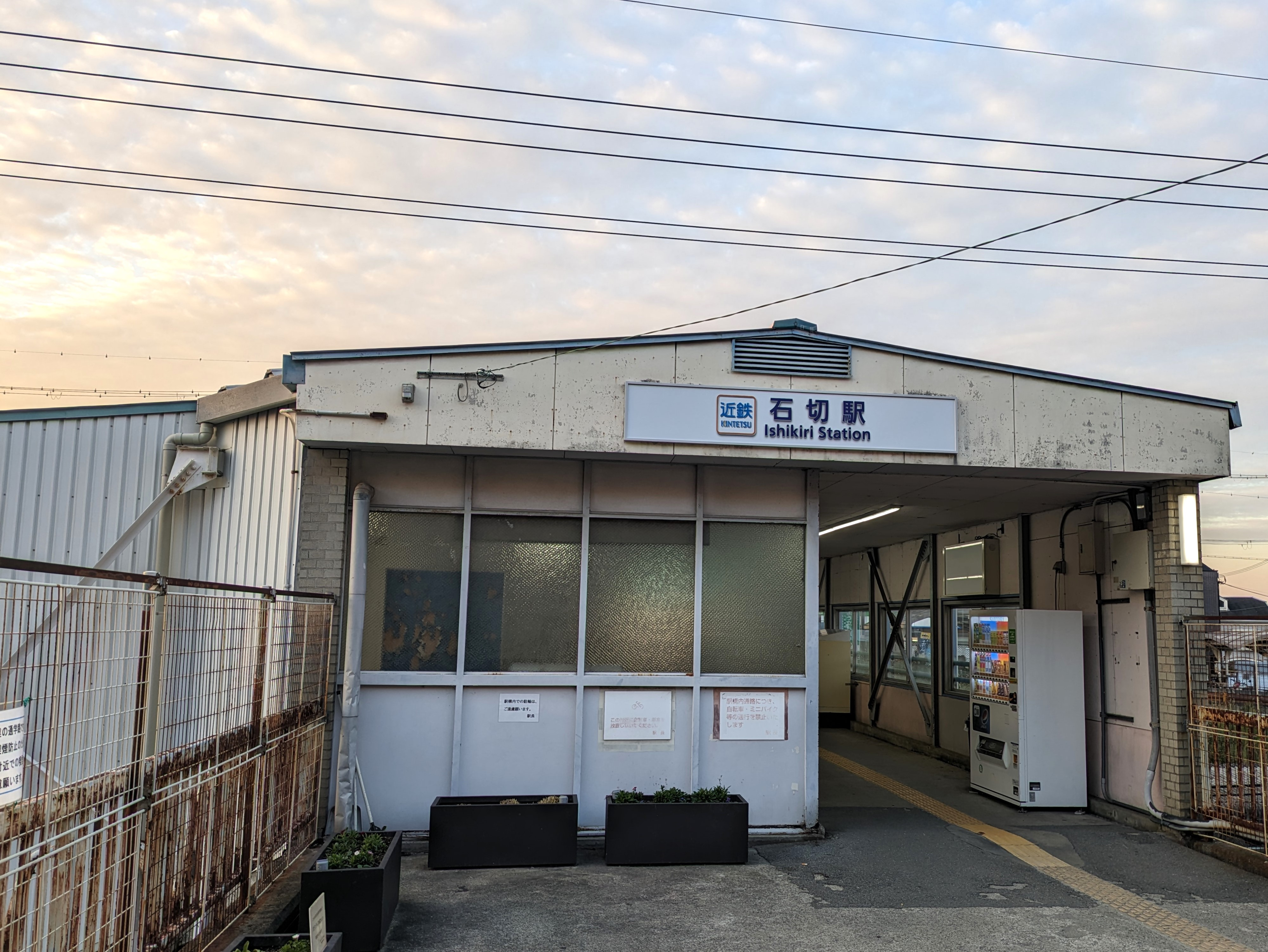
- Northeast entrance of Ishikiri Station in December 2023

General information
- Location: 2-1-6, Kamiishikiri-chō, Higashiōsaka City, Osaka Prefecture （大阪府東大阪市上石切町二丁目1-6） Japan
- Coordinates: 34°41′07″N 135°39′20″E
- Operator: Kintetsu Railway
- Line: Nara Line
- Distance: 10.1 km from Fuse
- Platforms: 2 island platforms
- Connections

Other information
- Station code: A16
- Website: Official website

History
- Opened: April 30, 1914

Passengers
- FY2018: 8,887 daily

Services
Preceding station	Kintetsu Railway	Following station
Nukata towards Ōsaka Uehommachi	Nara Line Local Suburban Semi-Express	Ikoma towards Kintetsu Nara
Higashi-Hanazono towards Ōsaka Uehommachi	Nara Line Semi-Express	Ikoma towards Kintetsu Nara
Fuse towards Ōsaka Uehommachi	Nara Line Express	Ikoma towards Kintetsu Nara
Location
- Location within Osaka Prefecture Location within Japan

Ishikiri Station (石切駅, Ishikiri-eki; station number: A16) is a passenger railway station in located in the city of Higashiōsaka, Osaka Prefecture, Japan, operated by the private railway operator Kintetsu Railway.

== Lines ==
Ishikiri Station is served by the Nara Line, and is located 10.1 rail kilometers from the starting point of the line at Fuse Station and 16.2 kilometers from Ōsaka Namba Station.

== Station layout ==
The station consists of two island platforms connected by an elevated station building.

=== Platforms ===
1	■ Nara Line	for Ikoma, Yamato-Saidaiji, Nara and Tenri returning for Ōsaka Namba and Amagasaki
2	■ Nara Line	for Ikoma, Yamato-Saidaiji, Nara and Tenri
3, 4	■ Nara Line	for Fuse, Ōsaka Uehommachi, Ōsaka Namba and Amagasaki

== History ==
Ishikiri Station opened on April 30, 1914. In 1941 it was transferred to the Kansai Kyūkō Railway, which became part of Kintetsu in 1944.

== Passenger statistics ==
In fiscal 2018, the station was used by an average of 8,887 passengers daily.

== Surrounding area ==
- Ishikiri Shrine
- Ishikiri Daibutsu
- Ishikiri Memorial Park
- Hotel Seiryu

== See also ==
- List of railway stations in Japan
