= Ayameike Station =

Railway station in Nara, Nara Prefecture, Japan

Ayameike Station 菖蒲池駅
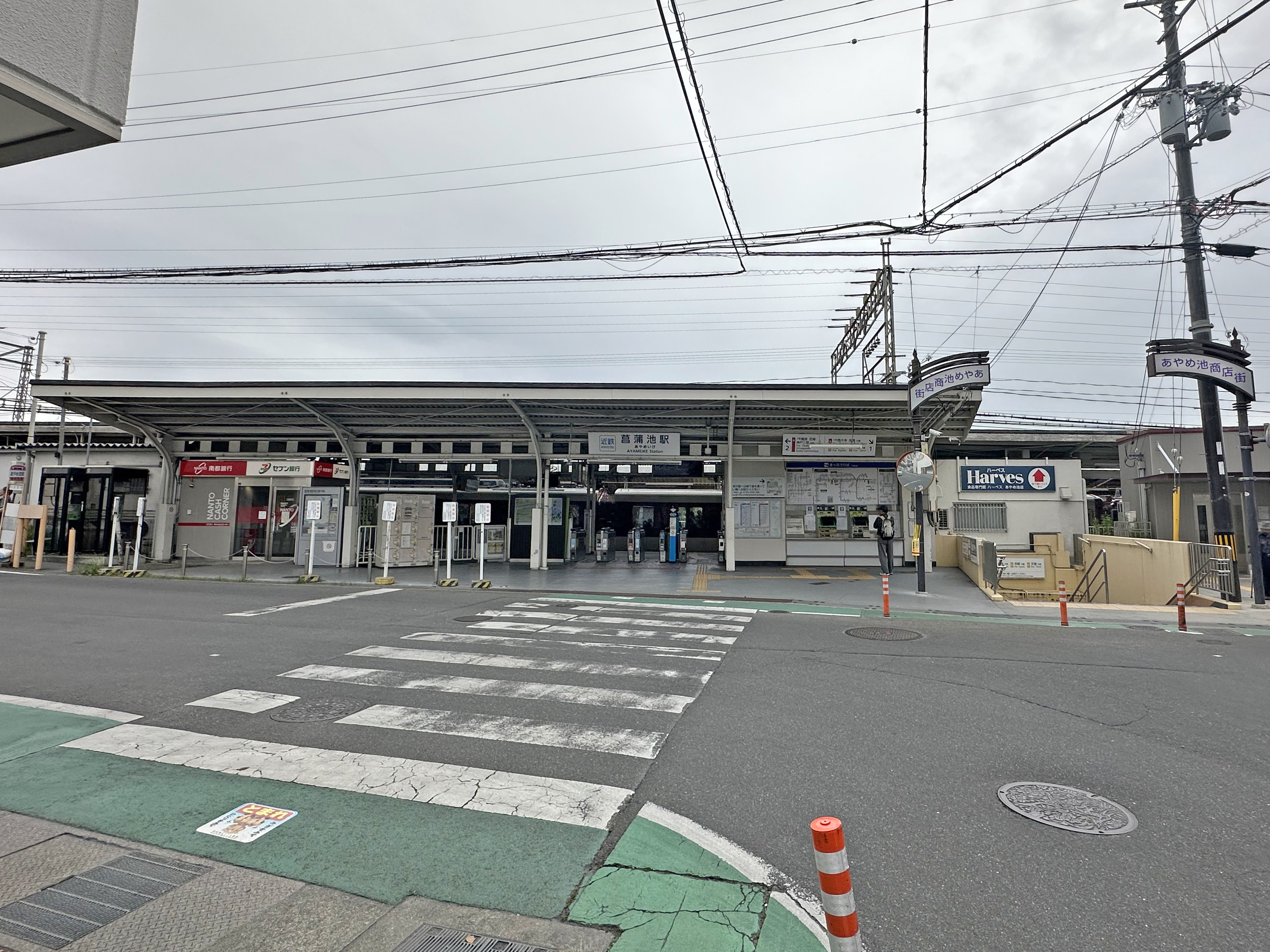
- The south entrance of Ayameike Station in May 2024

General information
- Location: 2-2-1, Ayameike-minami, Nara, Nara （奈良県奈良市あやめ池南二丁目2-1）
- Coordinates: 34°41′53.17″N 135°45′39.32″E
- System: Kintetsu Railway commuter rail station
- Owner: Kintetsu Railway
- Operator: Kintetsu Railway
- Line: Nara Line
- Distance: 20.1 km (12.5 miles) from Fuse
- Platforms: 2 side platforms
- Tracks: 2
- Train operators: Kintetsu Railway
- Connections: Bus stop

Construction
- Cycle facilities: Available
- Accessible: Yes

Other information
- Station code: A21
- Website: www.kintetsu.co.jp/station/station_info/station03020.html

History
- Opened: 9 September 1923

Passengers
- FY2022: 10,997 daily

Services
Preceding station	Kintetsu Railway	Following station
Gakuen-mae towards Ōsaka Uehommachi	Nara Line Local Suburban Semi-Express Semi-Express	Yamato-Saidaiji towards Kintetsu Nara
Location

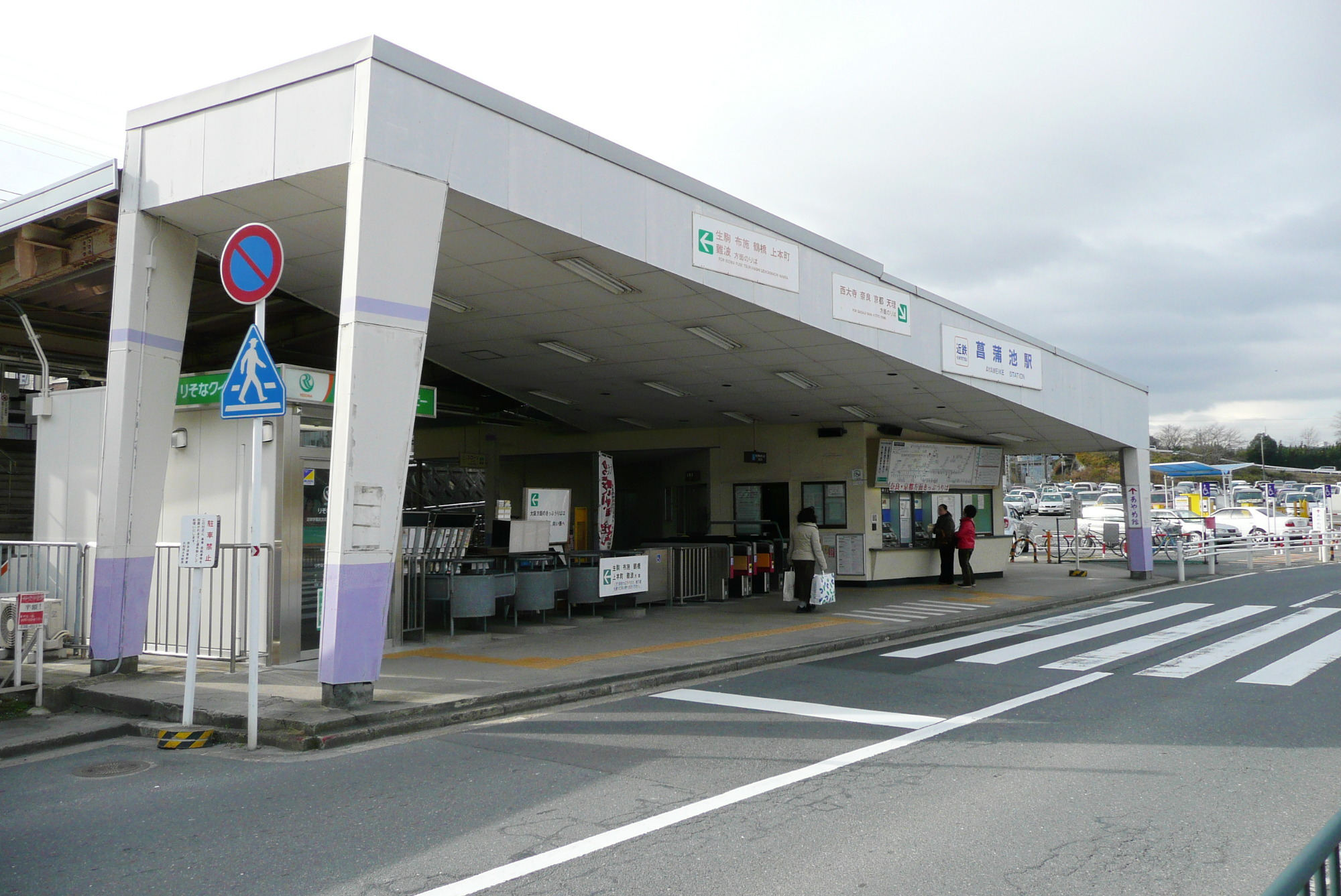
North entrance (2008)

Ayameike Station (菖蒲池駅, Ayameike-eki) is a passenger railway station located in the city of Nara, Nara Prefecture, Japan. It is operated by the private transportation company, Kintetsu Railway.

== Line ==
Ayameike Station is served by the Nara Line and is 20.1 kilometers from the starting point of the line at Fuse and 26.2 kilometers from Osaka Namba.

== Layout ==
The station is an above-ground station with two opposing side platforms and two tracks. The ticket gates are separate for each platform, and there are no connection between platforms within the premises. The station is staffed.

== Platforms ==
1	■ A Nara Line	for Yamato-Saidaiji and Nara; Change trains at Yamato-Saidaiji for Tenri and Kyoto
2	■ A Nara Line	for Gakuen-mae, Fuse, Osaka Uehommachi, Osaka Namba and Amagasaki

== History ==
Ayameike Station was opened 9 September 1923 by the Osaka Electric Tramway, and was raised to a permanent station in September 1924. It became a station on the Kansai Kyuko Railway Co. (Kankyu) in 1941.

== Passenger statistics ==
In fiscal 2022, the station was used by an average of 10,997 passengers daily (boarding passengers only).

== Surrounding area ==
- The former site of the Kintetsu Ayameike Amusement Park (closed on June 6, 2004)
- Kinki University Elementary School
- Kinki University Kindergarten
- Herves Ayameike
- Cospa Ayameike
- HANA
- Iris Water Terrace Ayameike

== See also ==
- List of railway stations in Japan
