= Shin-Ōmiya Station =

Railway station in Nara, Nara Prefecture, Japan

Shin-Ōmiya Station 新大宮駅
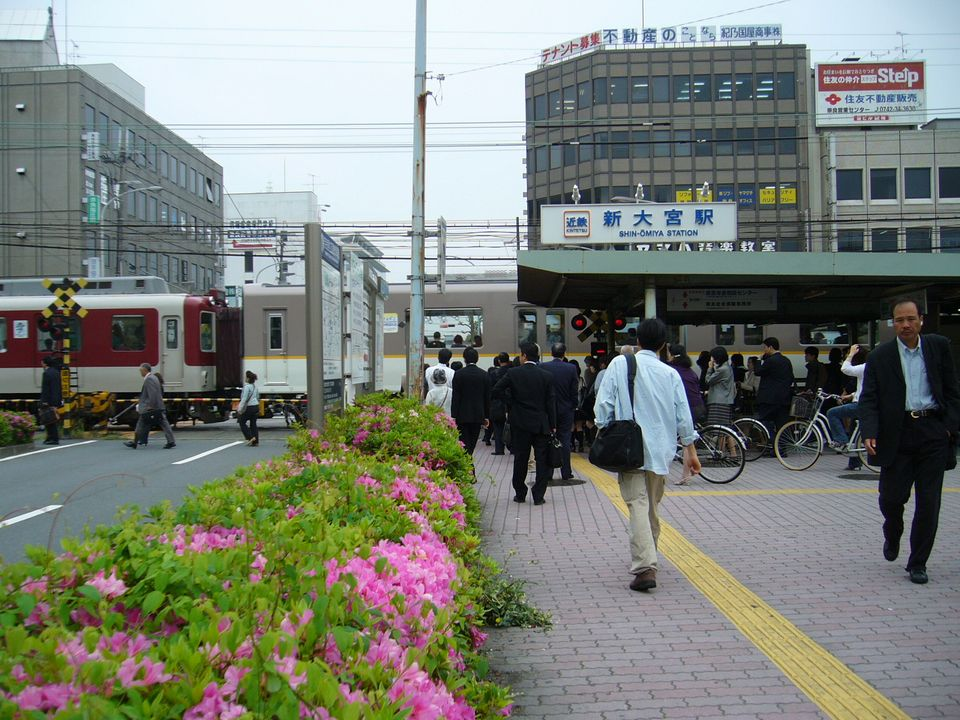
- Shin-Ōmiya Station, August 2007

General information
- Location: 4-15-5, Shibatsuji-chō, Nara, Nara （奈良県奈良市芝辻町四丁目15-5） Japan
- Coordinates: 34°41′7.63″N 135°48′41.43″E
- System: Kintetsu Railway commuter rail station
- Owner: Kintetsu Railway
- Operator: Kintetsu Railway
- Line: Nara Line
- Distance: 25.0 km (15.5 miles) from Fuse
- Platforms: 2 side platforms
- Tracks: 2
- Train operators: Kintetsu Railway
- Connections: Bus stop

Construction
- Cycle facilities: Available
- Accessible: Yes

Other information
- Station code: A27
- Website: www.kintetsu.co.jp/station/station_info/station03022.html

History
- Opened: 8 December 1969

Passengers
- FY2022: 25,098 daily

Services
Preceding station	Kintetsu Railway	Following station
Yamato-Saidaiji towards Ōsaka Uehommachi	Nara Line Local Suburban Semi-Express Semi-Express Express Rapid Express	Kintetsu Nara Terminus
Location

Shin-Ōmiya Station (新大宮駅, Shin-Ōmiya-eki) is a passenger railway station located in the city of Nara, Nara Prefecture, Japan. It is operated by the private transportation company, Kintetsu Railway.

== Line ==
Shin-Ōmiya Station is served by the Nara Line and is 25.0 kilometers from the starting point of the line at Fuse and 31.3 kilometers from Osaka Namba. Trains of the Kintetsu Kyoto Line pass through the station without stopping.

== Layout ==
The station has two opposed side platforms and two tracks. The effective length of the platform is 10 cars. The station is unattended.

== Platforms ==
1	■ A Nara Line	for Nara
2	■ A Nara Line	for Yamato-Saidaiji, Osaka Namba and Amagasaki

== History ==
Shin-Ōmiya Station opened on 8 December 1969.

== Passenger statistics ==
In fiscal 2022, the station was used by an average of 25,098 passengers daily (boarding passengers only).

== Surrounding area ==
- JR Nara Station
- Nara City Hall
- Nara Municipal Ichijo High School

== See also ==
- List of railway stations in Japan
