= Hiraoka =

Hiraoka may refer to:

- Hiraoka (surname), a Japanese surname
- Hiraoka Station (disambiguation), multiple train stations in Japan
- Hiraoka Dam, a dam in Nagano Prefecture, Japan
- Hiraoka Shrine, a Shinto shrine in Osaka Prefecture, Japan
- 11072 Hiraoka, a main-belt asteroid
