= Fusazane =

- Gender: Male

Origin
- Origin: Japanese
- Meaning: Different meanings depending on the kanji used

Fusazane (written: 房実) is a masculine Japanese given name. Notable people with the name include:

- Hiraoka Fusazane (平岡 房実) (1513–1572), Japanese samurai
- Kujō Fusazane (九条 房実) (1290–1327), Japanese kugyō
