= Imazato Station =

Imazato Station may refer to:

- Imazato Station (Kintetsu) on the Kintetsu Osaka Line in Ikuno-ku, Osaka, Japan.
- Imazato Station (Osaka Metro) on the Osaka Metro Sennichimae Line and the Imazatosuji Line in Higashinari-ku, Osaka, Japan.
