= Nara Line (Kintetsu) =

Railway line in Osaka & Nara, Japan

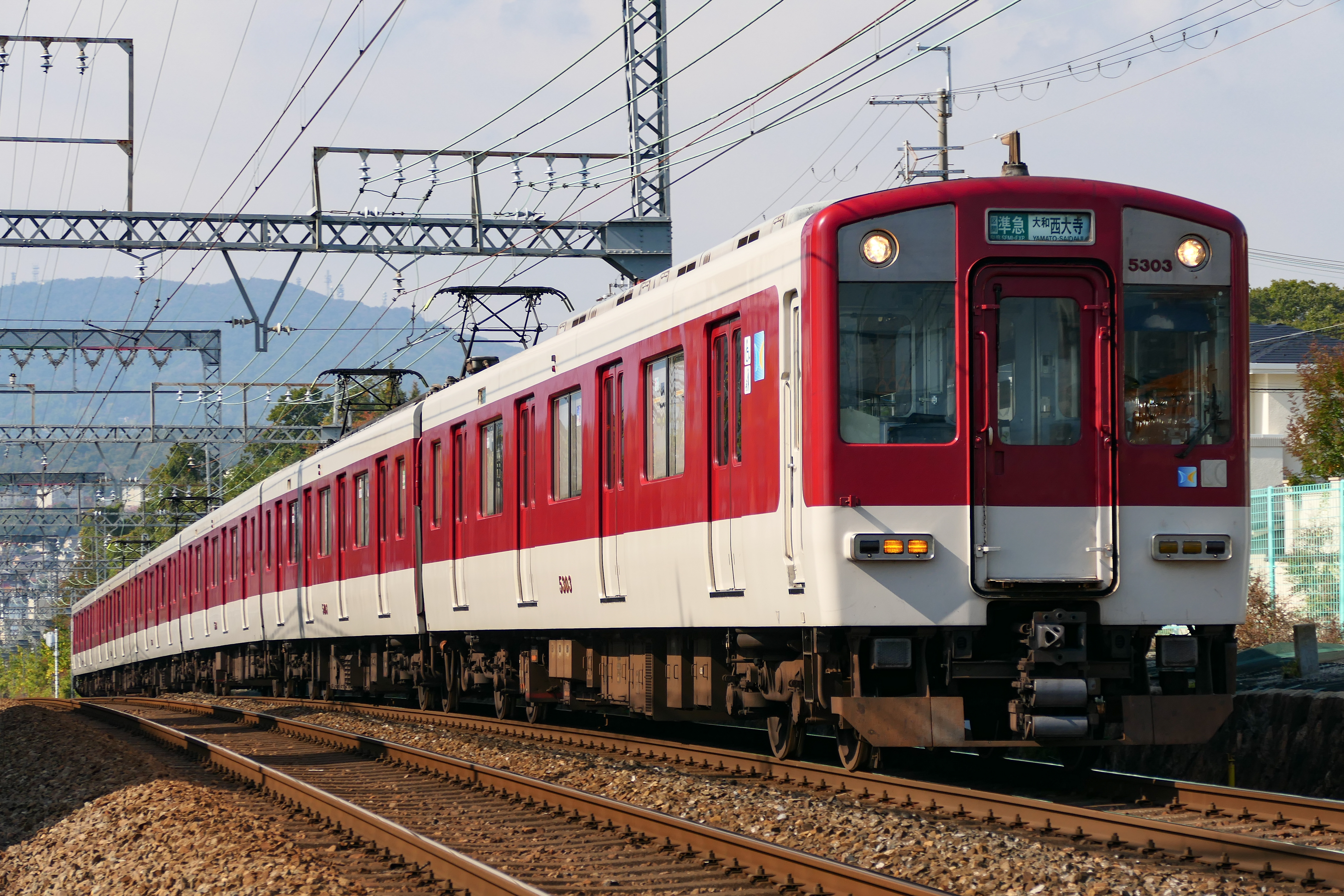
- A Kintetsu 5800 series on the Nara Line

Overview
- Native name: 奈良線
- Owner: Kintetsu Railway
- Line number: A
- Locale: Higashiosaka, Osaka, Japan; Ikoma, Nara, Japan; Nara, Nara, Japan
- Termini: Ōsaka Namba (34.6671°N 135.4989°E); Kintetsu Nara (34.6843°N 135.8274°E)
- Stations: 24 (22 as the Kintetsu Osaka Line and 2 as the Kintetsu Namba Line)
- Color on map: (#c22047)

Service
- Type: Heavy rail; Commuter rail
- System: Kintetsu Railway
- Operator(s): Kintetsu Railway
- Depot(s): Higashi-Hanazono; Saidaiji

History
- Opened: April 30, 1914; 111 years ago

Technical
- Track length: 26.7 km (16.6 mi)
- Number of tracks: Double-track
- Character: Heavy rail; Commuter rail
- Track gauge: 1,435 mm (4 ft 8 1/2 in) standard gauge
- Electrification: 1,500 V DC (Overhead lines)
- Operating speed: 105 km/h (65 mph)
- Signalling: Automatic closed block
- Train protection system: Kintetsu ATS
- Maximum incline: 3.57%

The Nara Line (奈良線, Nara sen) is a Japanese railway line owned by the Kintetsu Railway. The line connects Fuse Station in the eastern suburbs of Osaka to Kintetsu Nara Station in the historic city of Nara, though operationally, the line begins at Ōsaka Namba Station on the Namba Line. Additionally, some trains run through-services starting at Kobe Sannomiya Station on the Hanshin Railway Main Line in Kobe. Eastern satellite cities such as Higashiosaka and Ikoma are connected by the line. This line is more direct than the JR line between Osaka and Nara.

== History ==
The line was opened by Osaka Electric Railway Company (大阪電気軌道, Osaka Denki Kidō) in 1914, dual track and electrified at 600 VDC.

Whereas the JR West Yamatoji Line routes south of the Ikoma mountain range to connect Osaka and Nara, the Kintetsu Nara Line uses a 3.4 km (2.1 mi) tunnel through the Ikoma mountain range. As a result, the Kintetsu route is more direct and has allowed municipalities along the line such as Ikoma to flourish as major commuter hubs. To respond to high demand, the railway operates services with up to ten cars long during the peak hours operating as rapid and limited express services. Because of the direct routing, the Nara Line is highly regarded for being the most important commuter rail route in the Kinki region. Higher demand over the years has gradually lead to a reduction of faster midday services as Kintetsu moved to a higher frequency of limited express trains during peak hours.

In 1969 the voltage was increased to 1500 VDC, and in 1970 the Namba Line was opened, and the operational starting station of the Line moved to Kintetsu Namba Station, from Uehonmachi Station of Osaka Line.

== Operation ==
Trains run to and from the Kintetsu Namba Line and the Hanshin Namba Line, and lead to Osaka Namba Station and Amagasaki Station, and Rapid Express trains also to Kobe Sannomiya Station on the Hanshin Main Line. Between Yamato-Saidaiji and Kintetsu Nara, through trains of the Kyoto Line also run.

Local trains
Amagasaki (Hanshin) or Ōsaka Namba - Higashi-Hanazono or Yamato-Saidaiji (partly Kintetsu Nara)
in the morning and the evening:Amagasaki (Hanshin) or Ōsaka Namba - Hyotan-yama or Higashi-Ikoma
partly: Amagasaki (Hanshin) or Ōsaka Namba - Ishikiri
partly: Yamato-Saidaiji - Kintetsu Nara
only one train: Ikoma → Yamato-Saidaiji (as the last connection from the last limited express train from Osaka for Nara)
Suburban Semi-Express trains
Amagasaki (Hanshin) or Ōsaka Namba - Yamato-Saidaiji or Kintetsu Nara
Semi-Express trains
Amagasaki (Hanshin) or Ōsaka Namba - Yamato-Saidaiji or Kintetsu Nara
Express trains, Limited Express trains
Ōsaka Namba - Kintetsu Nara
Rapid Express trains
Kobe Sannomiya (Hanshin) or Amagasaki (Hanshin) or Ōsaka Namba - Kintetsu Nara

== Stations ==
- ●: Trains stop.
- |: Trains pass.
- ▲: Trains stop when the large events are held at Kintetsu Hanazono Rugby Stadium.
- ※: One rapid express train for Nara stops at Ayameike on school days for Kinki University Elementary School and Kinki University Kindergarten.
- Local trains (普通, Futsū or 各駅停車, Kakueki-teisha) stop at every station.

line name	No.	Station name	Japanese	Suburban Semi-Express	Semi-Express	Express	Rapid Express	Limited Express	Transfers	Location	
Through service to Hanshin Namba Line:				from Ōsaka Namba: Local, Suburban Semi-Express, Semi-Express: to Amagasaki on the Hanshin Namba Line; Rapid Express: to Kobe Sannomiya via Amagasaki on the Hanshin Main Line (3 trains start from Shinkaichi on the Kobe Kosoku Line on Saturdays, Sundays, and holidays.)							
Namba Line	A01	Ōsaka Namba	大阪難波	●	●	●	●	●	Hanshin Namba Line (through service); Osaka Metro (Namba); Sennichimae Line (S16); Midosuji Line; Yotsubashi Line (Y15); Nankai (NK01: Namba); Nankai Main Line; Nankai Koya Line; Q Kansai Main Line (Yamatoji Line) (JR-Q17:JR Namba)	Chūō-ku, Osaka	Osaka; Prefecture
Namba Line	A02	Kintetsu Nippombashi	近鉄日本橋	●	●	●	●	●	Osaka Metro (Nippombashi): Sennichimae Line (S17); Sakaisuji Line (K17)	Chūō-ku, Osaka	Osaka; Prefecture
Namba Line	A03	Ōsaka Uehommachi (Kintetsu Department Store Uehommachi)	大阪上本町	●	●	●	●	●	Osaka Metro (Tanimachi Kyūchōme): Sennichimae Line (S18); Tanimachi Line (T25); Tracks of the Namba Line are also connected to Osaka Line tracks.	Tennoji-ku, Osaka	Osaka; Prefecture
Osaka Line	A03	Ōsaka Uehommachi (Kintetsu Department Store Uehommachi)	大阪上本町	●	●	●	●	●	Osaka Metro (Tanimachi Kyūchōme): Sennichimae Line (S18); Tanimachi Line (T25); Tracks of the Namba Line are also connected to Osaka Line tracks.	Tennoji-ku, Osaka	Osaka; Prefecture
Osaka Line	A04	Tsuruhashi	鶴橋	●	●	●	●	|	Sennichimae Line (S19); O Osaka Loop Line (JR-O04)	Ikuno-ku, Osaka	Osaka; Prefecture
Osaka Line	A05	Imazato	今里	|	|	|	|	|		Ikuno-ku, Osaka	Osaka; Prefecture
Osaka Line	A06	Fuse	布施	●	●	●	|	|	D Osaka Line (D06)	Higashi-Osaka	Osaka; Prefecture
Nara Line	A06	Fuse	布施	●	●	●	|	|	D Osaka Line (D06)	Higashi-Osaka	Osaka; Prefecture
Nara Line	A07	Kawachi-Eiwa	河内永和	|	|	|	|	|	F Osaka Higashi Line (JR-F10: JR Kawachi-Eiwa)	Higashi-Osaka	Osaka; Prefecture
Nara Line	A08	Kawachi-Kosaka (Osaka University of Commerce, Osaka Shoin Women's University)	河内小坂	●	●	|	|	|		Higashi-Osaka	Osaka; Prefecture
Nara Line	A09	Yaenosato	八戸ノ里	|	|	|	|	|		Higashi-Osaka	Osaka; Prefecture
Nara Line	A10-1 Provisional	Uryūdō (Tentative, Planned)	瓜生堂（仮称）						Osaka Monorail Main Line (proposed extension)	Higashi-Osaka	Osaka; Prefecture
Nara Line	A10-2	Wakae-Iwata	若江岩田	|	|	|	|	|		Higashi-Osaka	Osaka; Prefecture
Nara Line	A11	Kawachi-Hanazono	河内花園	|	|	|	|	|		Higashi-Osaka	Osaka; Prefecture
Nara Line	A12	Higashi-Hanazono (Hanazono Rugby Stadium)	東花園	●	●	▲	▲	|		Higashi-Osaka	Osaka; Prefecture
Nara Line	A13	Hyōtan-yama	瓢箪山	●	|	|	|	|		Higashi-Osaka	Osaka; Prefecture
Nara Line	A14	Hiraoka	枚岡	●	|	|	|	|		Higashi-Osaka	Osaka; Prefecture
Nara Line	A15	Nukata	額田	●	|	|	|	|		Higashi-Osaka	Osaka; Prefecture
Nara Line	A16	Ishikiri	石切	●	●	●	|	|			Osaka; Prefecture
Nara Line	A17	Ikoma	生駒	●	●	●	●	●	C Keihanna Line (C27); G Ikoma Line (G17); Y Ikoma Cable Line (Y17: Toriimae)	Ikoma	Nara; Prefecture
Nara Line	A18	Higashi-Ikoma (Tezukayama University Higashi-Ikoma Campus)	東生駒	●	●	|	|	|		Ikoma	Nara; Prefecture
Nara Line	A19	Tomio	富雄	●	●	|	|	|		Nara	Nara; Prefecture
Nara Line	A20	Gakuen-mae (Tezukayama Gakuen)	学園前	●	●	●	●	|		Nara	Nara; Prefecture
Nara Line	A21	Ayameike	菖蒲池	●	●	|	※	|		Nara	Nara; Prefecture
Through service to:			From Yamato-Saidaiji: Local trains to B Kyoto Line for Kyōto (only some to Kintetsu Nara); Express trains to B Kyoto Line for Kyōto or Kyoto Municipal Subway Karasuma Line for Kokusaikaikan (all through to Kintetsu Nara)								
Nara Line	A26	Yamato-Saidaiji	大和西大寺	●	●	●	●	●	B Kyoto Line; B Kashihara Line	Nara	Nara; Prefecture
Nara Line	A27	Shin-Ōmiya	新大宮	●	●	●	●	|		Nara	Nara; Prefecture
Nara Line	A28	Kintetsu Nara	近鉄奈良	●	●	●	●	●		Nara	Nara; Prefecture

== Kintetsu Namba Line ==
Namba Line
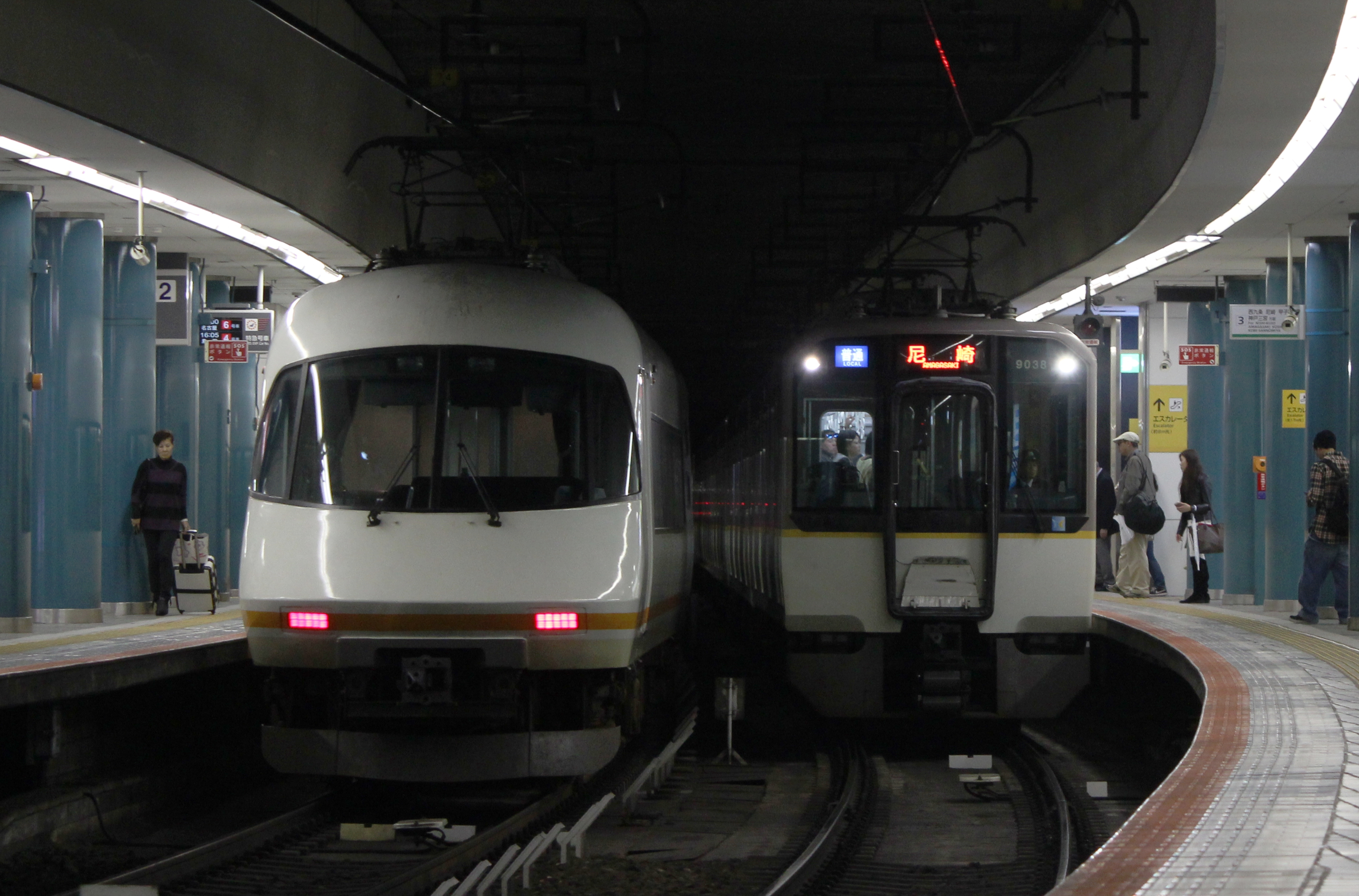

Overview
- Native name: 難波線
- Line number: A
- Locale: Osaka
- Termini: Osaka Uehommachi; Ōsaka Namba
- Stations: 3

Service
- Type: Heavy rail
- Operator(s): Kintetsu Railway

History
- Opened: March 15, 1970; 55 years ago

Technical
- Line length: 2.0 km (1.2 mi)
- Track gauge: 1,435 mm (4 ft 8 1/2 in)
- Electrification: 1,500 V DC, overhead lines
- Operating speed: 80 km/h (50 mph)

The Namba Line (難波線, Nanba Sen) is an underground railway line owned by the Kintetsu Railway in Osaka, Japan, and opened in 1970. It is an extension of the Osaka Line and the Nara Line. The line is parallel to the Osaka Municipal Subway Sennichimae Line (Namba - Tanimachi Kyuchome). Along with the commuter trains of the Nara Line and the Hanshin Namba Line, some intercity trains including the "Urban Liner" connecting Osaka and Nagoya, also run on the line.
