= Hiraoka (surname) =

Hiraoka (written: 平岡) is a Japanese surname. Notable people with the surname include:

- Hiraoka Fusazane (平岡 房実, 1513–1572), Japanese samurai
- Hideo Hiraoka (平岡 秀夫, born 1954), Japanese politician
- Hideo Hiraoka (racing driver) (平岡 英郎, born 1971), Japanese drifting driver
- Hiroaki Hiraoka (平岡 拓晃, born 1985), Japanese judoka
- Hiroaki Hiraoka (footballer) (平岡 宏章, born 1969), Japanese footballer
- Hiraoka Kimitake (平岡 公威, 1925–1970), Japanese writer, poet, playwright, actor and film director, better known as Yukio Mishima
- Naoki Hiraoka (平岡 直起, born 1973), Japanese footballer and manager
- Takashi Hiraoka (平岡 敬, born 1927), Japanese mayor
- Taku Hiraoka (平岡 卓, born 1995), Japanese snowboarder
- Tasuku Hiraoka (平岡 翼, born 1996), Japanese footballer
- Yasuhiro Hiraoka (平岡 康裕, born 1986), Japanese footballer
- Yasunari Hiraoka (平岡 靖成, born 1972), Japanese footballer
- Yūta Hiraoka (平岡 祐太, born 1984), Japanese actor
