= Hiraoka Station =

Hiraoka Station is the name of two train stations in Japan:

- Hiraoka Station (Nagano) (平岡駅)
- Hiraoka Station (Osaka) (枚岡駅)
