= Hiraoka Michiyori =

Japanese samurai

Hiraoka Michiyori (平岡 通倚; ? - ?) was a Japanese samurai of the Azuchi-Momoyama Period, who served in the campaigns of the Toyotomi clan, as a vassal to the Kono clan. His court title was Tōtōmi no kami. He inherited family headship from his father Fusazane, as well as rulership of Ebara Castle. In the invasion of Shikoku by Toyotomi Hideyoshi in 1585, Michiyori unsuccessfully defended Yuzuki castle against Kobayakawa Takakage. One year later, Michiyori was deployed to Takehara in Aki Province together with Kono Michinao. His life after this remains obscure.

His grave is at Jōruri-ji Temple in modern-day Matsuyama, Ehime.
