= Osaka Shoin Women's University =

Private Women's University in Osaka, Japan

Coordinates: 34.663102°N 135.577495°E

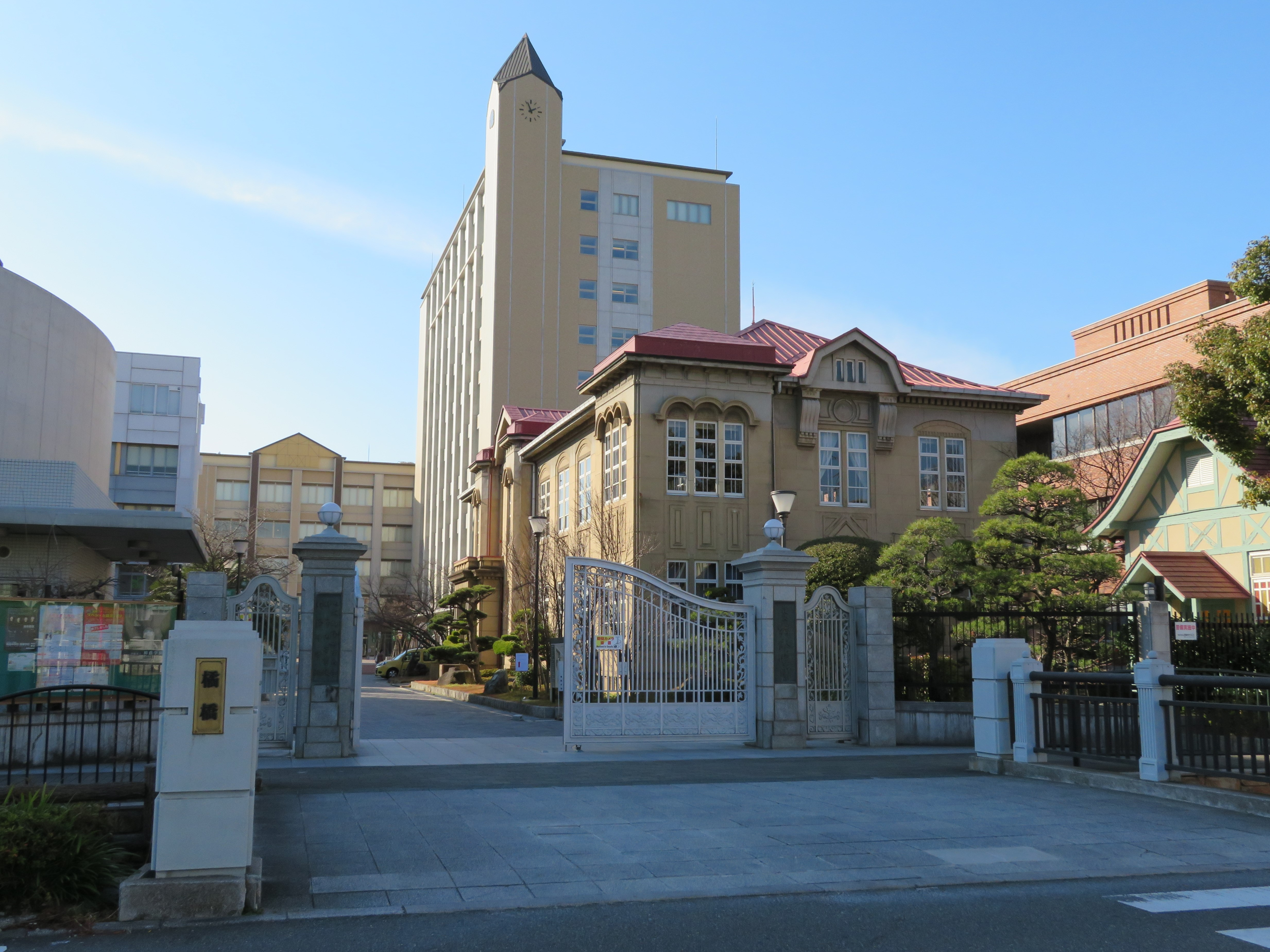
A memorial built in 1926.

Osaka Shoin Women's University (大阪樟蔭女子大学, Ōsaka shōin joshi daigaku) is a private women's college in Higashiosaka, Osaka, Japan. The predecessor of the school was founded in 1917, and it was chartered as a university in 1949.
