= Hiraoka Fusazane =

Samurai

Hiraoka Fusazane (平岡房実) (1513–1572) was a defender of the Kono house in feudal Japan, and the father of Hiraoka Michiyori.
