= Higashi-Hanazono Station =

Railway station in Higashiōsaka, Osaka Prefecture, Japan

Higashi-Hanazono Station 東花園駅
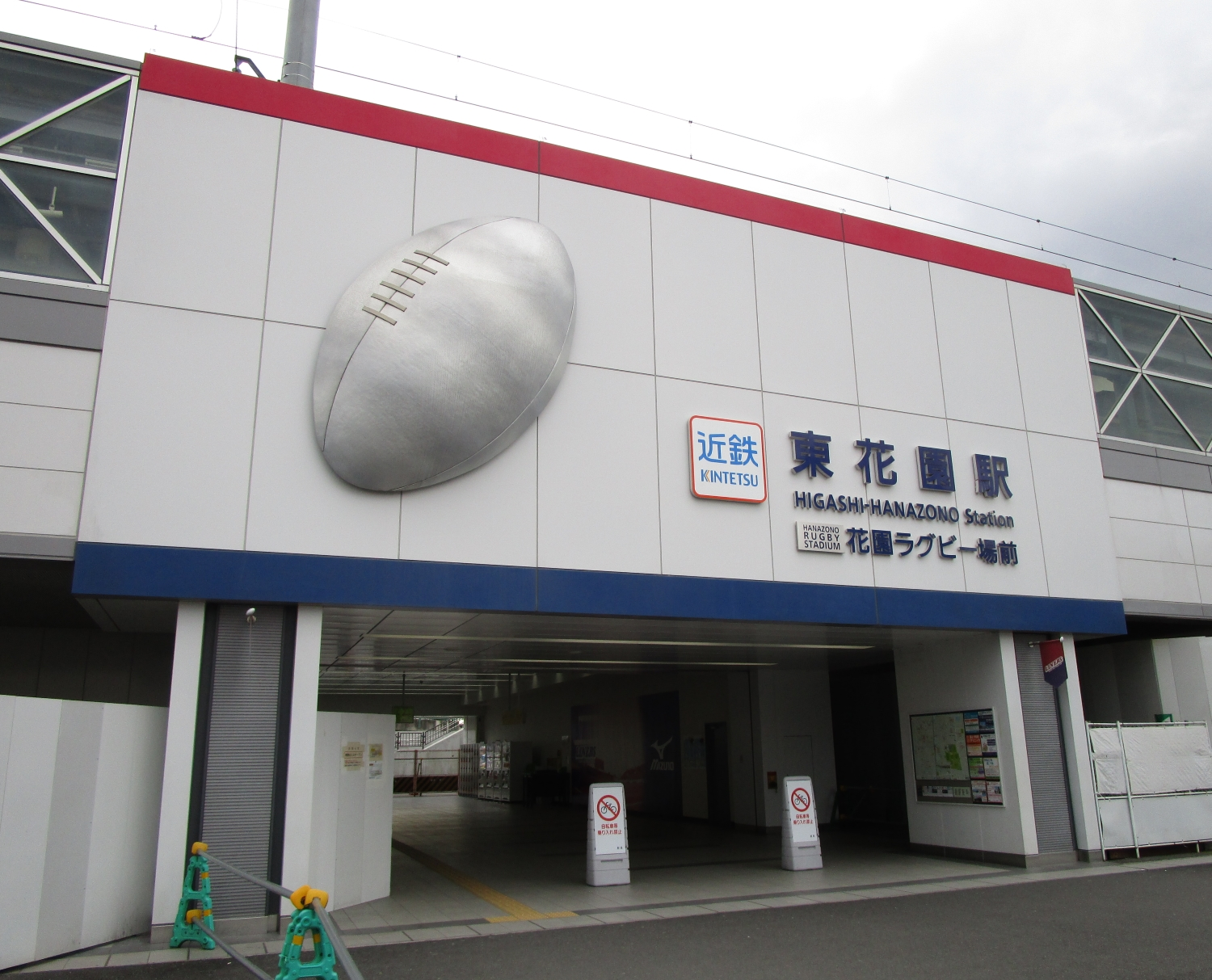
- Higashi-Hanazono Station entrance in January 2016

General information
- Location: 6-9-18, Yoshita, Higashiōsaka City, Osaka Prefecture （大阪府東大阪市吉田六丁目9-18） Japan
- Coordinates: 34°39′45.31″N 135°37′35.49″E
- Operator: Kintetsu Railway
- Line: Nara Line
- Distance: 5.8 km from Fuse
- Platforms: 2 island platforms

Other information
- Station code: A12
- Website: Official website

History
- Opened: 22 November 1929
- Former names: Rugby Undojo-mae; Rugby-jo-mae (until 1965)

Passengers
- FY2018: 19,107 daily
Location
- Location within Osaka Prefecture Location within Japan

Higashi-Hanazono Station (東花園駅, Higashi-Hanazono-eki; station number: A12) is a passenger railway station in located in the city of Higashiōsaka, Osaka Prefecture, Japan, operated by the private railway operator Kintetsu Railway. It is the nearest station to Higashi Osaka Hanazono Rugby Stadium.

== Lines ==
Higashi-Hanazono Station is served by the Nara Line, and is located 5.8 rail kilometers from the starting point of the line at Fuse Station and 11.9 kilometers from Ōsaka Namba Station.

== Station layout ==
The station consists of two elevated 10-car length island platforms serving four tracks, with the station building underneath. Higashi-Hanazono Inspection Depot is connected from the siding tracks numbered 1 and 3.

=== Platforms ===
1, 2	■ Nara Line	for Ikoma, Yamato-Saidaiji, Nara and Tenri
3, 4	■ Nara Line	for Fuse, Ōsaka Uehommachi, Ōsaka Namba, (Hanshin Namba Line) Amagasaki, Koshien and Kobe Sannomiya

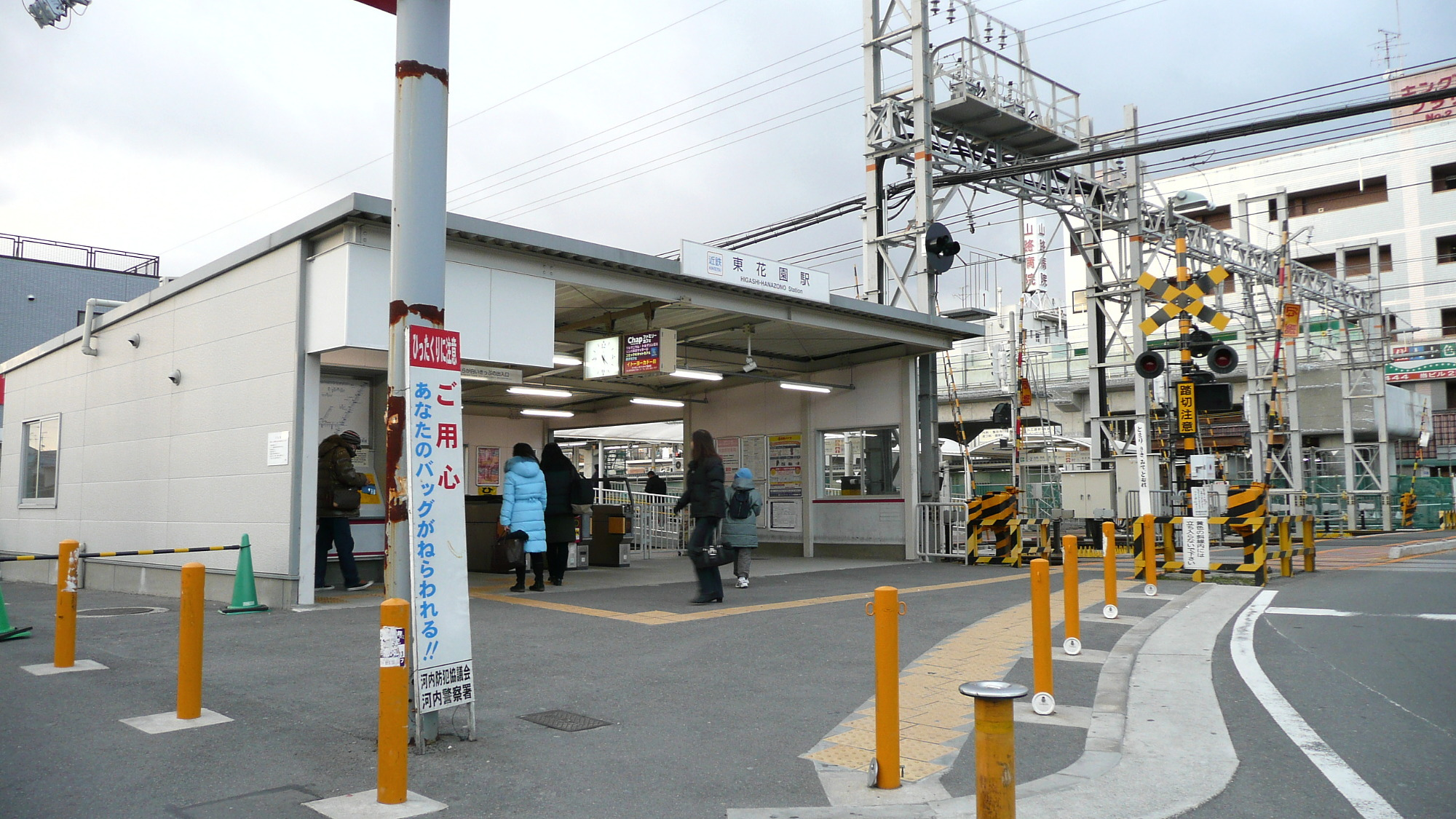
The south building during elevation work

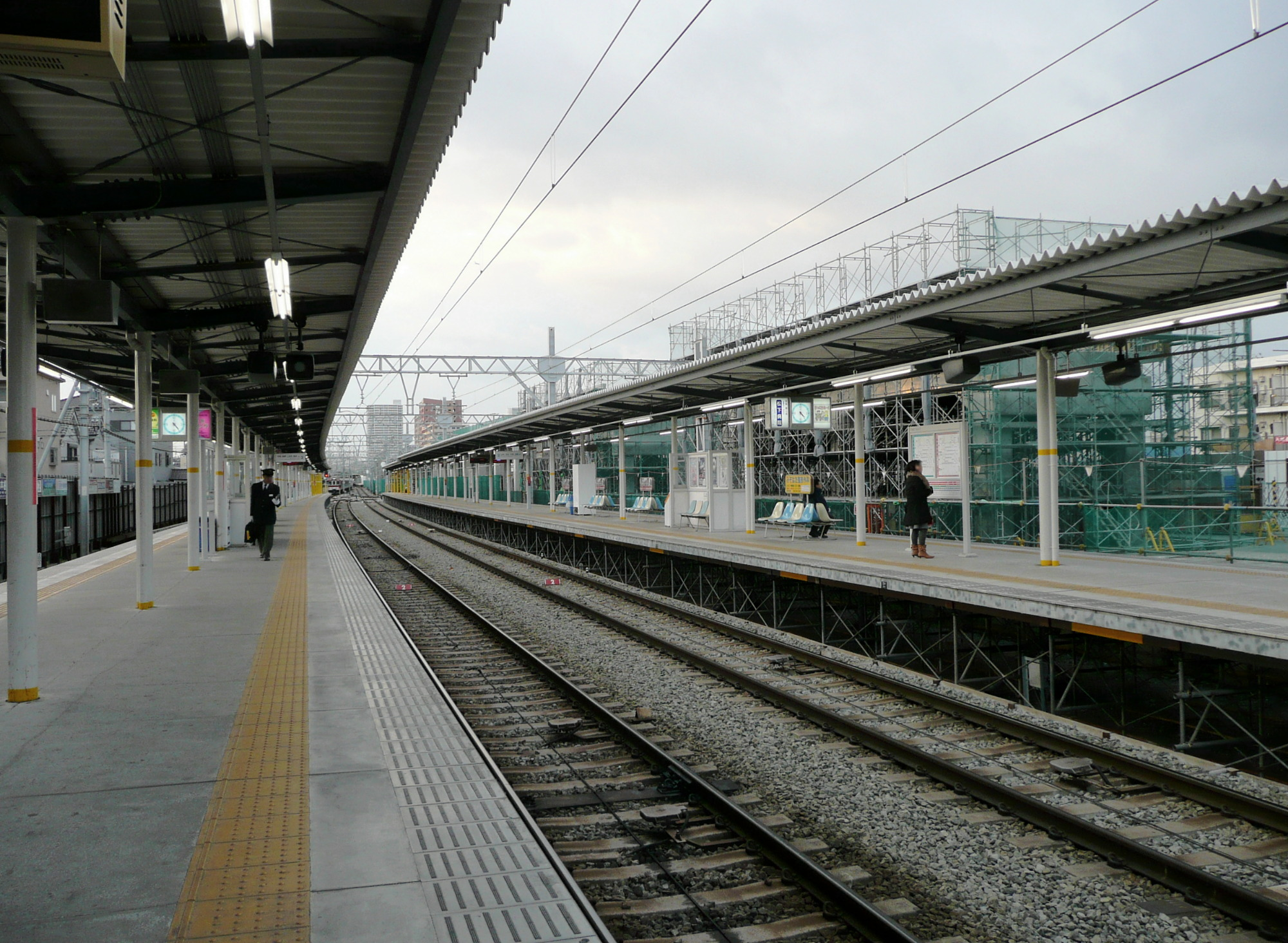
The platforms during elevation work

== Adjacent stations ==
«	Service	»
Nara Line (A12)
Express: Does not stop at this station
Rapid Express: Does not stop at this station
Limited Express: Does not stop at this station
Kawachi-Hanazono (A11)	Local	Hyotan-yama (A13)
Kawachi-Kosaka (A08)	Suburban Semi-Express	Hyotan-yama (A13)
Kawachi-Kosaka (A08)	Semi-Express	Ishikiri (A16)

When major events are held at Higashi Osaka Hanazono Rugby Stadium, some express trains and some rapid express trains stop at the station.

== History ==
The station opened on 22 November 1929, at the same time as Hanazono Rugby Stadium. The station at the time was only used during the rugby game season, and was named Rugby-Undoujō-mae Station (ラグビー運動場前駅).

In 1941, Osaka Electric Tramway merged with Sangu Kyuko Electric Railway and became a station of Kansai Kyuko Electric Railway. In 1944, Kankyu became Kintetsu and the station became part of Kintetsu. On 10 December 1950, the station was renamed Rugby-Jō-mae Station (ラグビー場前駅). In 1967, the station was renamed Higashi-Hanazono. Also in 1967, Higashi-Hanazono Depot was completed.

In 2010, the platform grade separation for "down" trains (towards Kintetsu Nara) was completed. In 2014, the platform grade separation for "up" trains (towards Ōsaka Namba) was completed.

== Passenger statistics ==
In fiscal 2018, the station was used by an average of 19,107 passengers daily.

== Surrounding area ==
- Higashi Osaka Hanazono Rugby Stadium
- Hanazono Central Park
- Higashi-Hanazono Inspection Depot

== See also ==
- List of railway stations in Japan
