= Fuse Station =

Railway station in Higashiōsaka, Osaka Prefecture, Japan

Fuse Station 布施駅
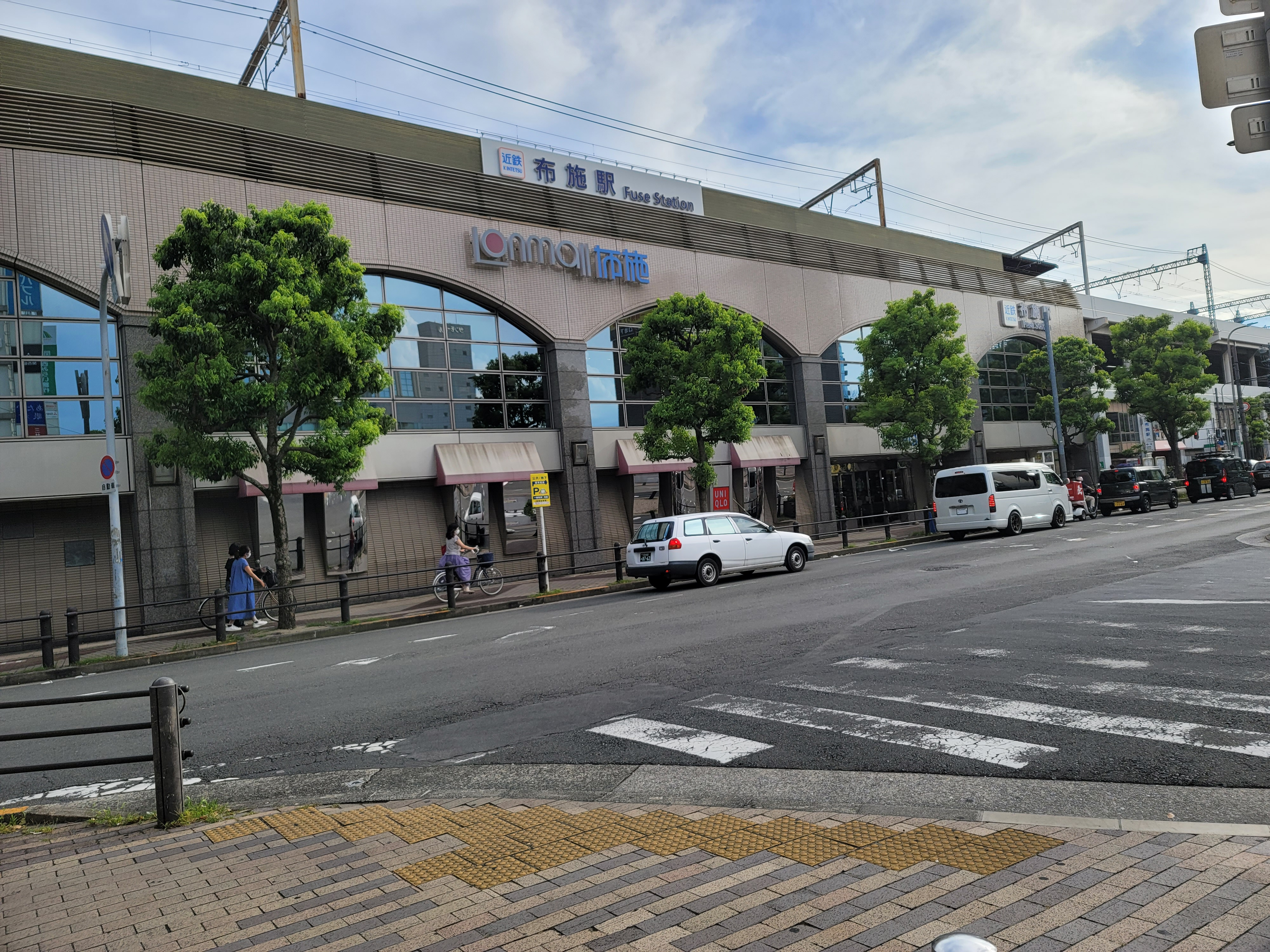
- Fuse Station, North Exit, August 2021

General information
- Location: 1-1-18, Chodo, Higashiōsaka City, Osaka Prefecture （大阪府東大阪市長堂一丁目1-18） Japan
- Coordinates: 34°39′50.82″N 135°33′47.56″E
- Operator: Kintetsu Railway
- Lines: D Osaka Line; A Nara Line
- Platforms: 2 island platforms
- Tracks: 8 (4 bypass)

Construction
- Structure type: Elevated

Other information
- Station code: A06; D06
- Website: Official website

History
- Opened: 30 April 1914; 112 years ago
- Former names: Fukae; Ajiro (until 1925)

Passengers
- FY2021: 32,374 daily
Track layout
Nara Line (4th level)
Osaka Line (3rd level)
Location
- Location within Osaka Prefecture Location within Kansai region Location within Japan

Fuse Station (布施駅, Fuse-eki) is an interchange passenger railway station located in the city of Higashiōsaka, Osaka Prefecture, Japan, operated by the private railway operator Kintetsu Railway.

== Lines ==
Fuse Station is served by the Osaka Line, and is located 4.1 rail kilometers from the starting point of the line at Ōsaka Uehommachi Station. It is also the nominal terminus of the Nara Line and is 26.7 kilometers from the opposing terminus at Kintetsu Nara Station.

== Station layout ==
The station has four levels; the first two levels are Kintetsu Department Store, the third level is for the Osaka Line, and the fourth level is for the Nara Line. There is an island platform serving 2 tracks between 2 passing tracks each on the third level and the fourth levels.

3rd level

| 2 | ■ Osaka Line | for Kawachi-Kokubu, Yamato-Yagi and Ise-Nakagawa |
| 3 | ■ Osaka Line | for Ōsaka Uehommachi |

4th level

| 6 | ■ Nara Line | for Higashi-Hanazono, Ikoma, Yamato-Saidaiji and Nara |
| 7 | ■ Nara Line | for Ōsaka Namba, Amagasaki and Kōbe Sannomiya |

== Adjacent stations ==
| « | Service | » |
Kintetsu Osaka Line (D06)
| Imazato (D05) | Local | Shuntokumichi (D07) |
| Tsuruhashi (D04) | Semi-Express; Suburban Semi-Express | Kintetsu Yao (D11) |
| Tsuruhashi (D04) | Express | Kawachi-Kokubu (D18) |
Rapid Express: Does not stop at this station
| Tsuruhashi (D04) | Limited Express (Ōsaka Uehommachi - Ujiyamada or Toba, from 9 a.m. until 5 p.m.) | Yamato-Yagi |
Limited Express (others): Does not stop at this station
Kintetsu Nara Line (A06)
| Imazato (A05) | Local | Kawachi-Eiwa (A07) |
| Tsuruhashi (A04) | Semi-Express; Suburban Semi-Express | Kawachi-Kosaka (A08) |
| Tsuruhashi (A04) | Express | Ishikiri (A16) |
Rapid Express: Does not stop at this station
Limited Express: Does not stop at this station

=== Bus ===
North
Osaka Municipal Transportation Bureau (Fuse-ekimae)
- Route 12 for Abenobashi
- Route 86 for Kami-Shinjo-ekimae
Osaka Bus Co., Ltd. (Higashi-Osaka Fuse)
- for Kyoto
- for Nagoya
- for Tokyo
South
Kintetsu Bus Co., Ltd. (Fuse-ekimae)
- Bus stop 1
  - Route 92 (Fuse Route) for JR Hanaten-ekimae
- Bus stop 2
  - Route 40 (Kami Route) for Hirano-ekimae
- Bus stop 3
  - Route 54 (Kami-Kosaka Route) for Shoinhigashi-mae (only 1 bus on Saturday mornings)

== History ==
Fuse Station opened on April 30, 1914, as Fukae Station (深江駅) of the Osaka Electric Railway Co. (Daiki). In March 1922 it was renamed Ajiro Station (足代駅), and renamed again to its present name in September 1925. In 1941, Daiki merged with Sangu Kyuko Electric Railway Co. and Fuse Station became a train station of Kansai Kyuko Electric Railway Co. (Kankyu), which became part of Kintetsu in 1944.

== Passenger statistics ==
In fiscal 2018, the station was used by an average of 39,370 passengers daily.

== Surrounding area ==
- Kintetsu Department Store Higashiosaka

== See also ==
- List of railway stations in Japan
