= Yamato-Saidaiji Station =

Railway station in Nara, Nara Prefecture, Japan

Yamato-Saidaiji Station 大和西大寺駅
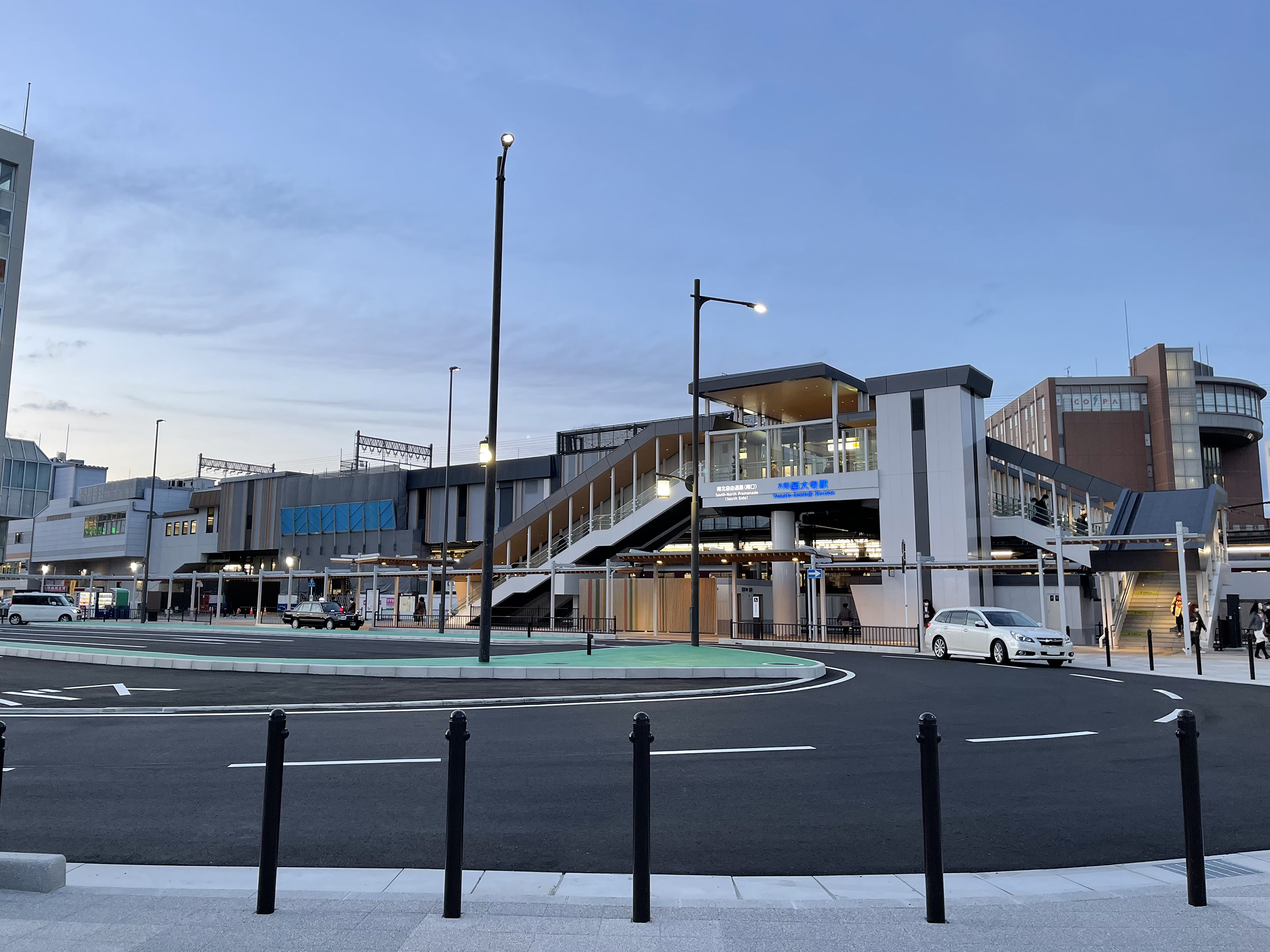

General information
- Location: 1-1-1, Saidaiji-Kunimichō, Nara, Nara （奈良県奈良市西大寺国見町一丁目1-1） Japan
- Coordinates: 34°41′38″N 135°46′58″E
- System: Kintetsu Railway commuter rail station
- Owner: Kintetsu Railway
- Operator: Kintetsu Railway
- Lines: A Nara Line; B Kyoto Line; B Kashihara Line
- Platforms: 3 island platforms
- Tracks: 6
- Train operators: Kintetsu Railway
- Connections: Bus terminal

Construction
- Cycle facilities: Available
- Accessible: Yes

Other information
- Station code: A26 , B26 , B26
- Website: www.kintetsu.co.jp/station/station_info/station03021.html

History
- Opened: 30 April 1914
- Former names: Saidaiji; Daiki Saidaiji (until 1941)

Passengers
- FY2022: 42,850 daily
Location

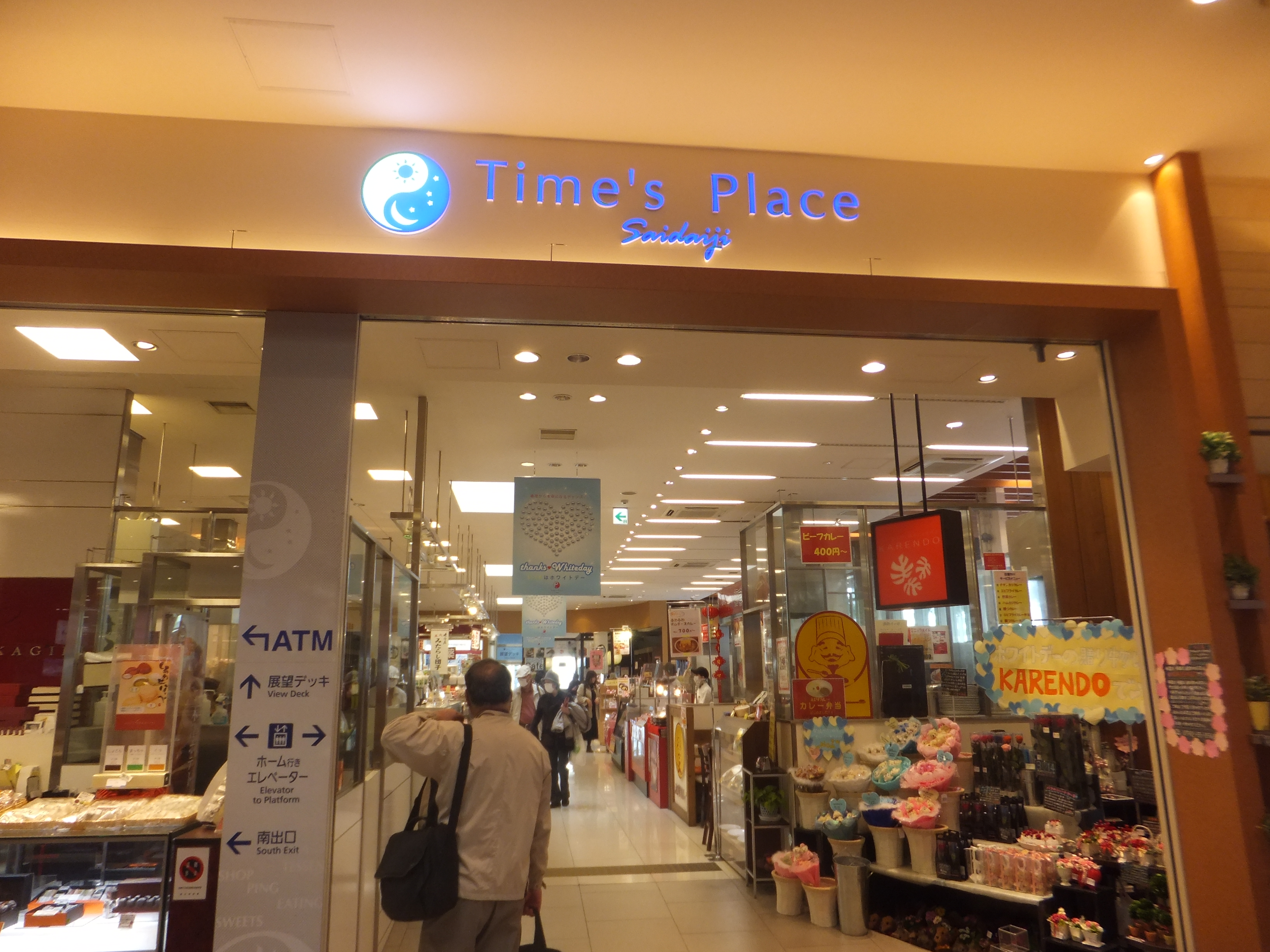
Time's Place Saidaiji

Yamato-Saidaiji Station (大和西大寺駅, Yamato Saidaiji-eki) is a junction passenger railway station located in the city of Nara, Nara Prefecture, Japan. It is operated by the private transportation company, Kintetsu Railway. The station is also referred to as Kintetsu Saidaiji Station (近鉄西大寺駅) or Saidaiji Station (西大寺駅).

== Lines ==
Yamato-Saidaiji Station is a junction of lines coming from four directions: the Nara line from Osaka in the west and Nara in the east, the Kyoto line from Kyoto in the north, and the Kashihara Line from Kashihara in the south. It is 22.3 kilometers from the starting point of the Nara Line at Fuse and 28.4 kilometers from Osaka Namba and is 24.6 kilometers from the starting point of the Kyoto Line. It is also the northern terminus of the 28.3 kilometer Kashihara Line to Kashiharajingū-mae.

== Layout ==
The station consists of three island platforms and five tracks. Each platform is connected to the elevated station building by an underground passageway, and the platforms are numbered to Platform 6 as Platforms 4 and 5 share the same track. Each platform has a usable length of 10 cars. The station is staffed.

== Platforms ==
1, 2	■ Nara Line	A for Nara
1, 2	■ Kashihara Line	B for Yamato-Yagi and Kashiharajingu-mae / H for Tenri; M for Ise-Shima; E Change trains at Yamato-Yagi for Nagoya; F Change trains at Kashiharajingu-mae for Yoshino
3, 4, 5	■ Nara Line	A for Gakuen-mae, Fuse, Ōsaka Namba, Amagasaki, Koshien and Kobe Sannomiya
3, 4, 5	■ Kyōto Line	B for Takanohara, Tambabashi, Kyōto and Kokusaikaikan
6	■ Kashihara Line	B starting for Yamato-Yagi and Kashiharajingu-mae; H starting for Tenri (mainly local trains)
6	■ Nara Line	A local trains and semi-express trains for Ōsaka Namba (only a few trains)

Track layout of Yamato-Saidaiji Station
	Kyoto Line to Kyoto
Nara Line to Ōsaka Namba		Nara Line to Kintetsu Nara
	Kashihara Line to Kashiharajingū-mae

== Adjacent stations ==
«	Service	»
Kintetsu Railway
Nara Line (A26)
Ayameike (A21)	Local	Shin-Ōmiya (A27)
Ayameike (A21)	Suburban Semi-Express	Shin-Ōmiya (A27)
Ayameike (A21)	Semi-Express	Shin-Ōmiya (A27)
Gakuen-mae (A20)	Express	Shin-Ōmiya (A27)
Gakuen-mae (A20)	Rapid Express	Shin-Ōmiya (A27)
Gakuen-mae (A20)	Limited Express (Ōsaka - Nara)	Kintetsu Nara (A28)
Kyoto Line (B26)
Heijo (B25)	Local	Amagatsuji (B27: Kashihara Line)
Takanohara (B24)	Express	Shin-Omiya (A27: Nara Line); Nishinokyo(B28: Kashihara Line) /Kintetsu Koriyama
Kintetsu Tambabashi (B07); Takanohara (B24) (northbound: first train - 9:40 a.m.) (southbound: departing from Kyōto after 3 p.m.)	Limited Express (Kyōto - Nara, Kashihara)	Kintetsu Nara (A28: Nara Line); Kashihara Line
Kintetsu Tambabashi (B07); Takanohara (B24) (northbound: 1 in the morning) (southbound: 2 after 3 p.m.)	Limited Express (Kyōto - Ise)	Yamato-Yagi (B39: Kashihara Line)
Kintetsu Tambabashi (B07)	Limited Express "Shimakaze"	Yamato-Yagi (B39: Kashihara Line)
Kashihara Line (B26)
Heijo (B25: Kyoto Line)	Local	Amagatsuji (B27)
Takanohara (B24: Kyoto Line)	Express	Nishinokyō (B28) (non-rush hour); Kintetsu Kōriyama (B30)
Kyoto Line	Limited Express (Kyōto - Kashihara)	Nishinokyō (B28) (non-rush hour); Yamato-Yagi (B39)
Kyoto Line	Limited Express (Kyōto - Ise)	Yamato-Yagi (B39)
Kintetsu Tambabashi (B07: Kyoto Line)	Limited Express "Shimakaze"	Yamato-Yagi (B39)

== History ==
Yamato-Saidaiji Station was opened 30 April 1914 as Saidaiji Station (西大寺駅) by the Osaka Electric Tramway. With the opening of the Unebi Line, it was moved about 150 meters west from its original location. The station was connected to the Nara Electric Railway in November 1928, and renamed Daiki-Saidaiji Station (大軌西大寺駅) in December 1932. The Osaka Electric Tramway merged with Sangu Express Railway on March 15, 1941, and the station was renamed Yamato Saidaiji Station (大和西大寺駅). The station was moved back to its original location in March 1965.

=== Incidents ===
On 8 July 2022, the area near the north entrance of the station became a crime scene when former Japanese Prime Minister Shinzo Abe was assassinated while campaigning around the vicinity.

== Passenger statistics ==
In fiscal 2022, the station was used by an average of 42,850 passengers daily (boarding passengers only).

== Surrounding area ==
=== North ===
- NaRaFamily
  - Kintetsu Department Store Nara
  - ÆON Nara
- Sanwa City Saidaiji
- Akishino-dera
- Place Heijō Palace used to be

=== South ===
- Kintetsu Saidaiji Building
  - Kintetsu Saidaiji Shopping Center
    - SupermarketKINSHO Saidaiji
- Kintetsu Daini Saidaiji Building
  - Saidaiji Daini Shopping Center
- Saidai-ji
- Saidaiji Police Box
- Kintetsu Saidaiji Inspection Depot

=== Bus stops ===
Buses are operated by Nara Kotsu Bus Lines Co., Ltd.

- Bus stop 1
  - Route 11 for Ichijo Senior High School
  - Route 12 for JR Nara Station via Hokkeji, Ichijo Senior High School and Kintetsu Nara Station
  - Route 14 for JR Nara Station via JASDF Nara Base, Hokkeji, Ichijo Senior High School and Kintetsu Nara Station
  - Route 73 for Utahimecho
- Bus stop 2
  - Route 72 for Oshikuma

== See also ==
- List of railway stations in Japan
