= Ōsaka Namba Station =

Railway station in Osaka, Japan

Osaka Namba Station 大阪難波駅
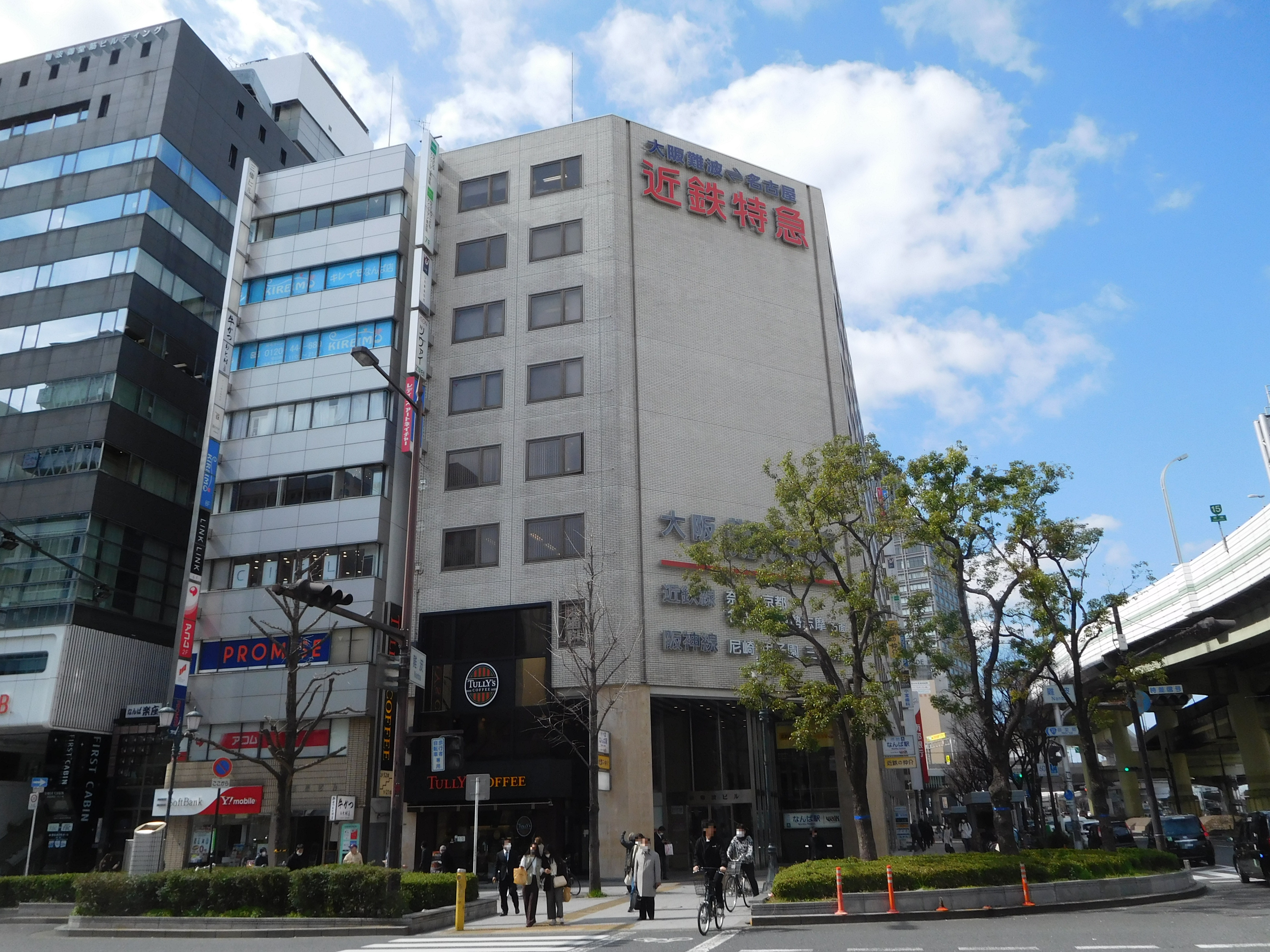
- Kintetsu Namba Building (Ōsaka Namba Station is located under this building)

General information
- Location: 4-1-17 Namba, Chūō-ku, Osaka, Osaka Prefecture （大阪府大阪市中央区難波四丁目1-17） Japan
- Coordinates: 34°40′02″N 135°29′57″E
- Operator: Kintetsu Railway; Hanshin Electric Railway
- Lines: Kintetsu Namba Line; Hanshin Namba Line
- Connections: Bus terminal

Other information
- Station code: ■A01 (Kintetsu) ■HS 41 (Hanshin)

History
- Opened: March 15, 1970
- Former names: Kintetsu Namba (until 2009)

Services
Preceding station	Kintetsu Railway	Following station
through to Hanshin Namba Line	Kintetsu Namba Line Local Semi-Express Suburban Semi-Express Rapid Express	Kintetsu Nippombashi towards Ōsaka Uehommachi
Terminus	Kintetsu Namba Line Express	Kintetsu Nippombashi towards Ōsaka Uehommachi
Terminus	Kintetsu Namba Line Kintetsu Limited Express	Ōsaka Uehommachi Terminus
Preceding station	Hanshin	Following station
through to Kintetsu Namba Line	Hanshin Namba Line Local Semi-Express Suburban Semi-Express Rapid Express	Sakuragawa towards Amagasaki
Location
- Location within Japan

Ōsaka Namba Station (大阪難波駅, Ōsaka-Nanba-eki) is a major railway station on the Kintetsu Namba Line and Hanshin Namba Line in the Namba district of Chūō-ku, Osaka, Japan. It is adjacent to Namba Station and JR Namba Station. Trains of the Nara Line depart from and arrive at the station.

== Lines ==
Ōsaka Namba Station is served by the following two lines.

- Kintetsu Namba Line
- Hanshin Namba Line

== Station layout ==
The station has an island platform and a side platform with three tracks on the third basement level, parallel to Namba Station on the Osaka Metro Sennichimae Line. There is a returning track in the west of the platforms between the two tracks of the Hanshin Namba Line.

=== Platforms ===
1, 2	■ Kintetsu Namba Line, Nara Line	for Osaka Uehommachi, Higashi-Hanazono, Yamato-Saidaiji and Nara for Tenri / for Nagoya / for Ise-Shima
3	■ Hanshin Namba Line	for Nishikujō, Amagasaki, Kōshien, and Kōbe Sannomiya

== History ==
The station was first named Kintetsu Namba Station (近鉄難波駅, Kintetsu-Nanba-eki) on March 15, 1970, when Kintetsu's Namba Line opened. It was renamed to the present name on March 20, 2009, the date of opening of the Hanshin Namba Line.

== Surrounding area ==
- Kintetsu Namba Building
- Midosuji Grand Building
- Dōtonbori
- Osaka City Air Terminal (OCAT)
- Minatomachi River Place (including FM OSAKA)
- Namba Parks, a shopping center and office complex
