= Kintetsu Nara Station =

Railway station in Nara, Nara Prefecture, Japan

Kintetsu Nara Station 近鉄奈良駅
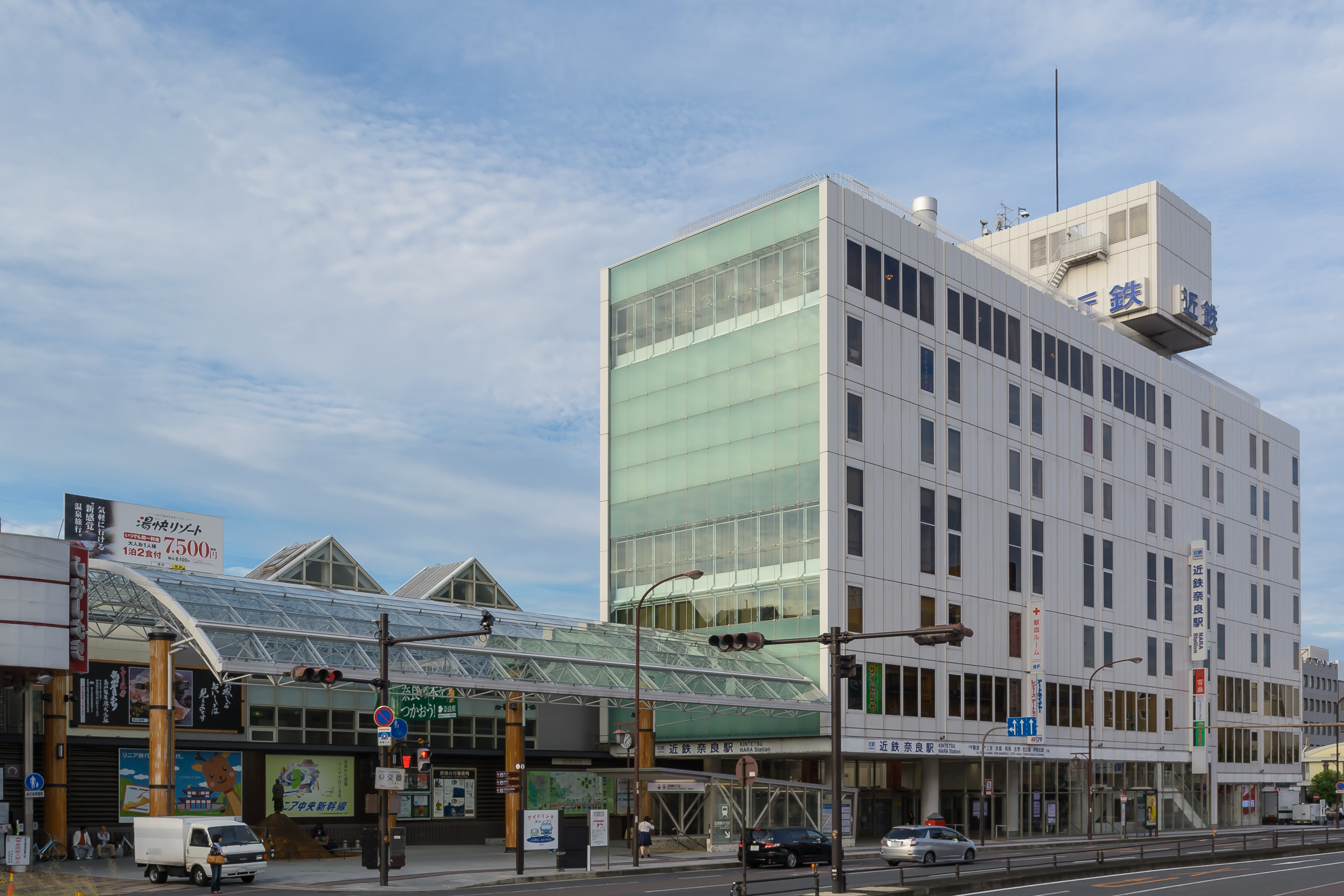
- Kintetsu Nara Station Building, September 2014

General information
- Location: 29 Higashimuki-Nakamachi, Nara, Nara （奈良県奈良市東向中町29） Japan
- Coordinates: 34°41′3.97″N 135°49′38.71″E
- Operator: Kintetsu Railway
- Line: Nara Line
- Connections: Bus terminal

Other information
- Station code: A28

History
- Opened: 30 April 1914
- Former names: Nara; Daiki Nara Station; Kankyu Nara Station; Kinki Nippon Nara (until 1970)

Passengers
- 2012: 51,147 daily
Location

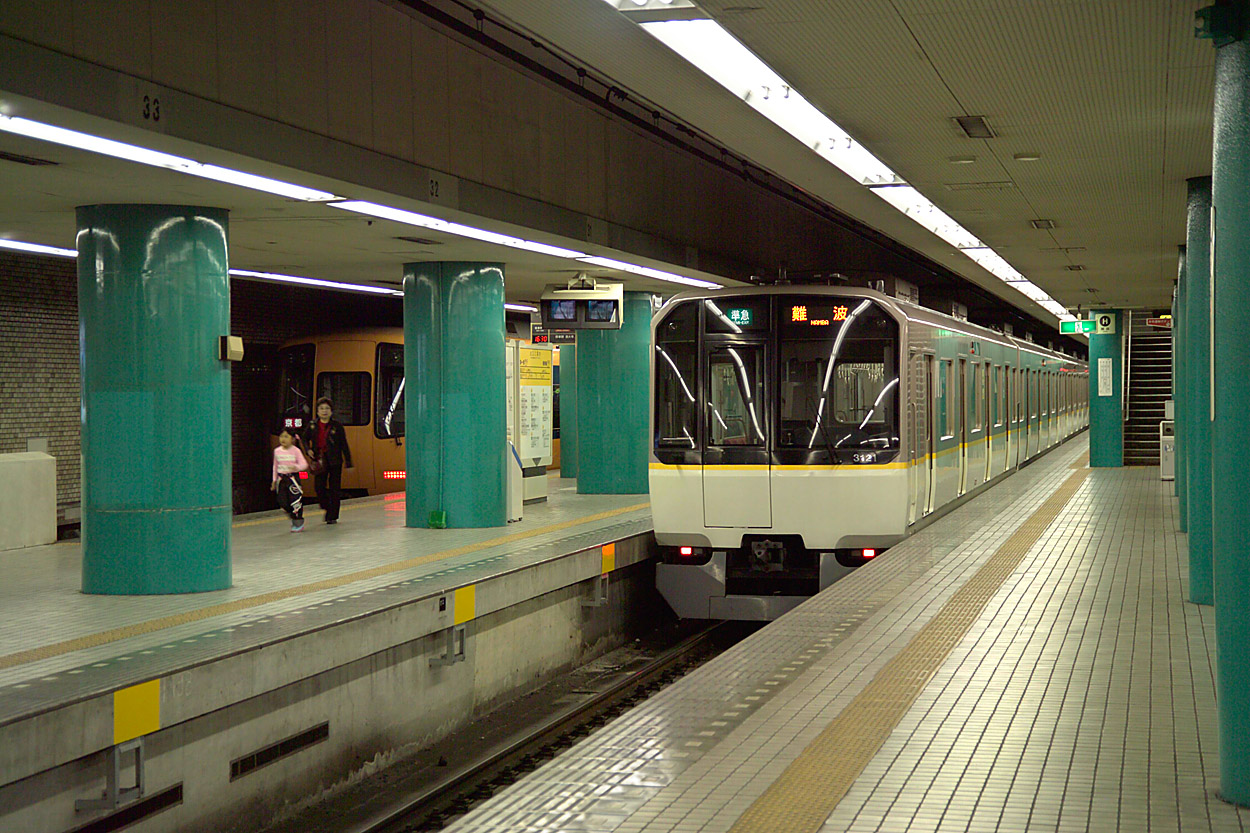
Kintetsu Nara platform, June 2005

Kintetsu Nara Station (近鉄奈良駅, Kintetsu-Nara-eki) is a railway station on the Nara Line in Nara, Japan, operated by the private railway operator Kintetsu Railway.

== Lines ==
The station is the terminal station on the Nara Line. Kintetsu operates through expresses and limited expresses from Kyoto Station and Ōsaka Namba Station in Osaka. Passengers taking non through trains from Kyoto on the Kyoto Line have to change trains at Yamato-Saidaiji Station to get to Kintetsu Nara.

== Station layout ==
The station consists of four platforms with four tracks on the second basement level.

=== Platforms ===
1 - 4	■ Nara Line	for Yamato-Saidaiji, Ōsaka Namba, Amagasaki, Koshien, and Kobe Sannomiya
1 - 4	■ Kyoto Line through trains	for Kyoto and Kokusaikaikan

== Adjacent stations ==
«	Service	»
Nara Line (A28)
Including Kyoto Line through trains
Shin-Ōmiya (A27)	Local	Terminus
Shin-Ōmiya (A27)	Semi-Express; Suburban Semi-Express	Terminus
Shin-Ōmiya (A27)	Express	Terminus
Shin-Omiya (A27)	Rapid Express	Terminus
Yamato-Saidaiji (A26/B26)	Limited Express	Terminus

== History ==
The station opened on 30 April 1914, initially named Nara Station (奈良駅). It was renamed Daiki Nara Station (大軌奈良駅) in August 1928, Kankyu Nara Station (関急奈良駅) on 15 March 1941, and Kinki Nippon Nara (近畿日本奈良駅) on 1 June 1944, before becoming Kintetsu Nara Station on 1 March 1970.

== Passenger statistics ==
In 2010, the station was used by an average of 67,761 passengers daily.

== Surrounding area ==
The station is located next to Kōfuku-ji and Nara Park; it is also possible to walk to the UNESCO World Heritage Sites of Tōdai-ji, and the Kasuga Shrine. Outside the station, passengers can also connect to buses and taxis.

Nara Station on the JR West Lines is located approximately 15 minutes to the southwest.
