= Kintetsu (disambiguation) =

Kintetsu is a Japanese railway corporation.

Kintetsu may also refer to:

== Kintetsu Railway ==
- Kintetsu Group Holdings, the holding corporation of the Kintetsu Railway
- Kintetsu Bus, a bus company and a subsidiary of Kintetsu Group Holdings
- Kintetsu Department Store, a department store chain and a subsidiary of Kintetsu Group Holdings
- Kintetsu World Express, a logistics service provider and a subsidiary of Kintetsu Group Holdings

== Sports organizations ==
- Kintetsu Liners, a rugby union football team belonging to theTop League in Japan
- Osaka Kintetsu Buffaloes, a former professional baseball team belonging to the Pacific League of Nippon Professional Baseball
  - Kintetsu Buffaloes, the previous name of Osaka Kintetsu Buffaloes
  - Kintetsu Pearls, the previous name of Osaka Buffaloes

== Train types ==
- Kintetsu 6820 series
- Kintetsu 7000 series
- Kintetsu 7020 series
- Kintetsu 9020 series
- Kintetsu 9820 series
- Kintetsu 15400 series
- Kintetsu 16600 series
- Kintetsu 22000 series
- Kintetsu 22600 series
- Kintetsu 23000 series
- Kintetsu 50000 series
