= Laurel Prize =

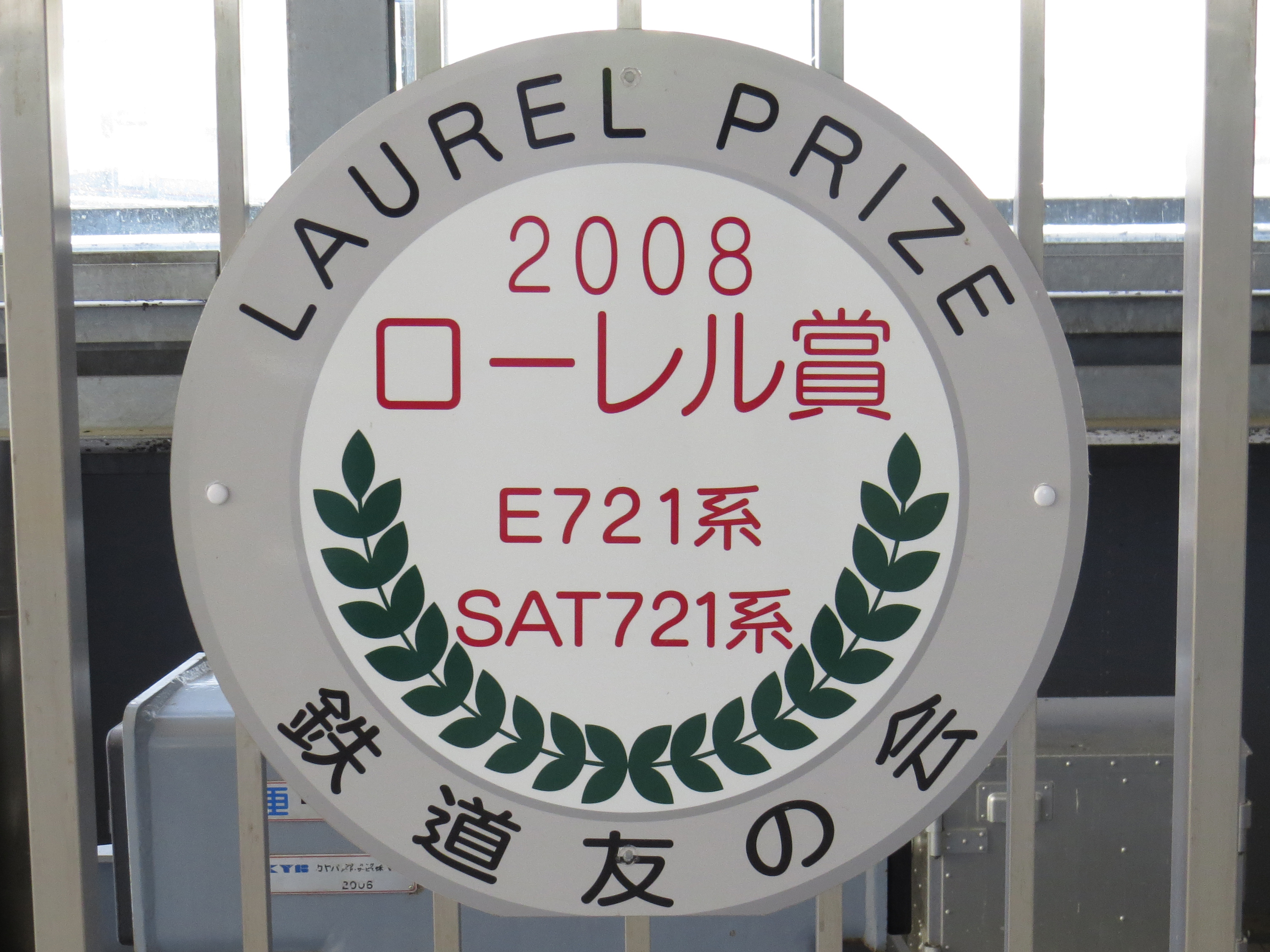
- Headmark panel commemorating the 48th Laurel Prize of JR East E721 series train
- Awarded for: Best railway-vehicle in terms of production intention, technology and design features, which was newly introduced in the previous year
- Date: February 18, 1961
- Country: Japan
- Presented by: Japan Railfan Club
- First award: 1961
- Currently held by: Tobu 80000 series; Iyotetsu 7000 series

Highlights
- Most awards: JR East
- Website: https://www.jrc.gr.jp/e/award/bl
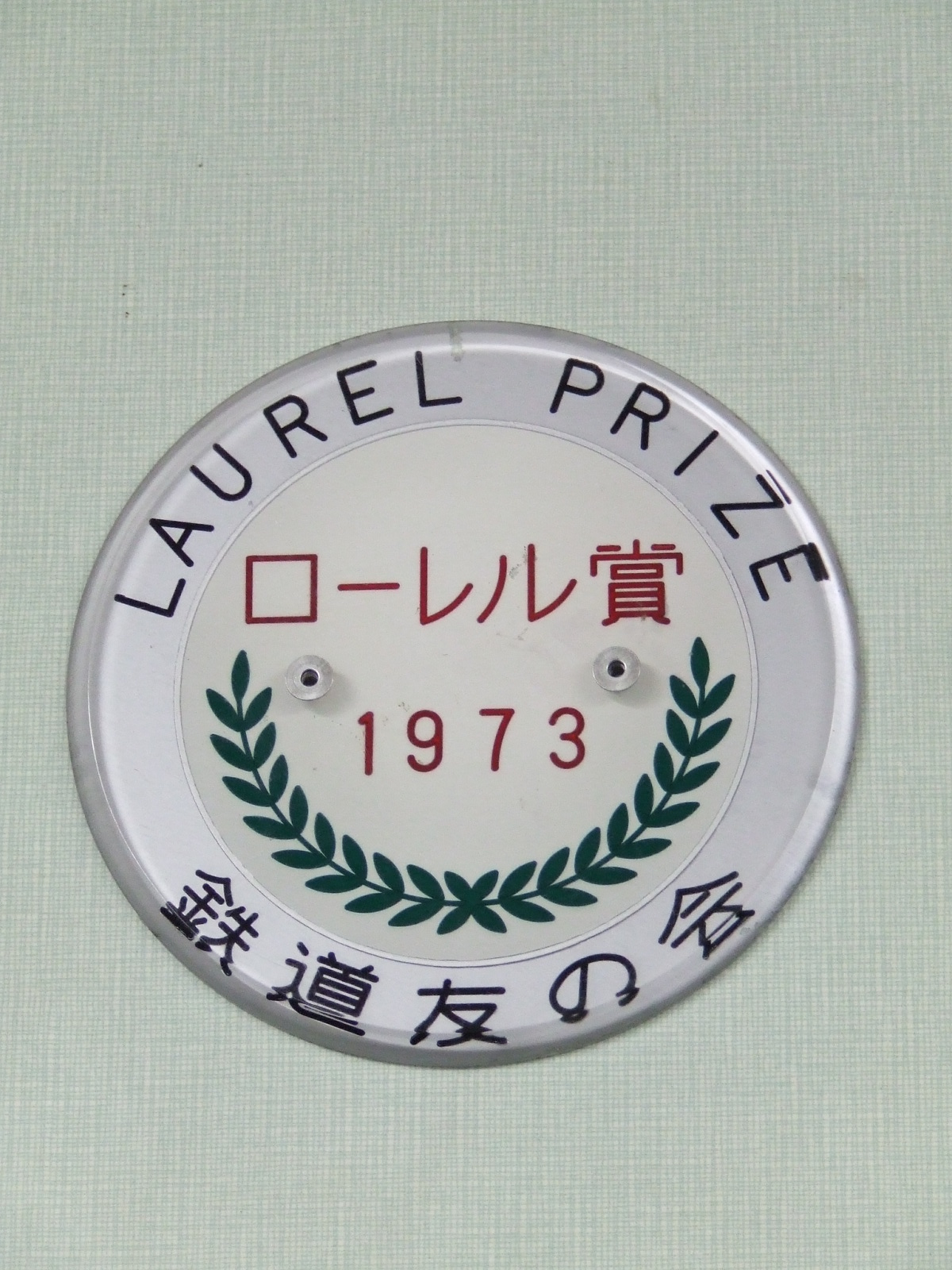
- 1973 Laurel Prize plaque inside an Odakyu 9000 series EMU train

The Laurel Prize (ローレル賞, Rōreru Shō) is an award presented annually in Japan since 1961 by the Japan Railfan Club. It is awarded for railway vehicles that entered service in the previous year and voted by the selection committee as having the most outstanding functional and design features.

== Award winners ==
The list of award winners since 1961 is as follows.

Award	Year	Train	Operator	Image
1	1961	2000 series EMU	Hankyu Railway	
1	1961	2300 series EMU	Hankyu Railway	
2	1962	401/421 series EMU	JNR	
3	1963	3000 series EMU	Keio Corporation	
4	1964	5000 series EMU	Keio Corporation	
5	1965	3000 series EMU	Sanyo Electric Railway	
6	1966	A830 series tramcar	Sapporo Streetcar	
7	1967	0 series OS Car EMU	Nagano Electric Railway	
8	1968	Not awarded	—N/a	
9	1969	6000 series EMU	Toei	
10	1970	60 series EMU	Osaka Municipal Subway	
11	1971	Mo 600 series tramcar	Nagoya Railroad	
12	1972	6000 series EMU	TRTA (now Tokyo Metro)	
13	1973	9000 series EMU	Odakyu Electric Railway	
14	1974	2000 series EMU	Nishi-Nippon Railroad	
15	1975	24/25 series coach	JNR	
15	1975	EH Class electric locomotive	Kurobe Gorge Railway	
16	1976	KiHa 66/67 DMU	JNR	
16	1976	8500 series EMU	Tokyu Corporation	
16	1976	5000 series EMU	Fujikyu	
17	1977	1000 series EMU	Joshin Electric Railway	
17	1977	6000 series EMU	Sapporo Municipal Subway	
18	1978	7000 series tramcar	Toei	
18	1978	1000 series EMU	Kobe Municipal Subway	
19	1979	800 series EMU	Keikyu Corporation	
19	1979	50 series coach	JNR	
20	1980	100 series EMU	Nagoya Railroad	
20	1980	7000 series EMU	Hokusō Railway	
20	1980	14760 series EMU	Toyama Chihō Railway	
21	1981	117 series EMU	JNR	
21	1981	2000 series tramcar	Nagasaki Tramway	
22	1982	1000 series EMU	Fukuoka City Transportation Bureau	
23	1983	200 Series Shinkansen	JNR	
23	1983	8200 series	Kumamoto City Transportation Bureau	
24	1984	6000 series EMU	Keihan Electric Railway	
25	1985	01 series	TRTA (now Tokyo Metro)	
25	1985	HaIMo 180 DMU	Tarumi Railway	
26	1986	10000 series EMU	Nankai Electric Railway	
26	1986	100 Series Shinkansen	JNR	
27	1987	8000 series EMU	Kita-Osaka Kyuko Railway	
27	1987	7000 series EMU	Kintetsu	
27	1987	KiHa 185 series DMU	JNR	
28	1988	1000 series EMU	Sendai City Transportation Bureau	
29	1989	783 series Hyper Saloon EMU	JR Kyushu	
30	1990	221 series EMU	JR West	
30	1990	2000 series "TSE" DMU	JR Shikoku	
31	1991	251 series EMU	JR East	
31	1991	70 series EMU	Osaka Municipal Subway	
32	1992	253 series Narita Express EMU	JR East	
32	1992	KiHa 200 series DMU	JR Kyushu	
33	1993	300 Series Shinkansen	JR Central	
33	1993	Class EF200 electric locomotive	JR Freight	
34	1994	Class DF200 "Eco-Power Red Bear" diesel locomotive	JR Freight	
35	1995	KiHa 281 series DMU	JR Hokkaido	
36	1996	383 series EMU	JR Central	
36	1996	KoKi 71 "Car Rack System" freight wagon	JR Freight	
37	1997	731 series EMU	JR Hokkaido	
38	1998	9700 series tramcar	Kumamoto City Transportation Bureau	
38	1998	900 series Kirara EMU	Eizan Electric Railway	
38	1998	5800 series EMU	Kintetsu	
39	1999	Skyrail 200 series	Skyrail Service	
40	2000	5000 series Green Mover tramcar	Hiroden	
40	2000	700 Series Shinkansen	JR Central/JR West	
40	2000	209-950 series (now E231-900 series) EMU	JR East	
41	2001	Mo 800 tramcar	Nagoya Railroad	
41	2001	3220 series "Series-21" EMU	Kintetsu	
41	2001	5820 series "Series-21" EMU	Kintetsu	
41	2001	9020 series "Series-21" EMU	Kintetsu	
42	2002	KiHa 187 series DMU	JR West	
43	2003	9200 series "Momo" tramcar	Okayama Electric Tramway	
43	2003	1000 series "U-tram" tramcar	Kagoshima City Transportation Bureau	
44	2004	Not awarded	—N/a	
45	2005	800 Series Shinkansen	JR Kyushu	
45	2005	3000 series tramcar	Nagasaki Electric Tramway	
46	2006	2000 series μSky EMU	Nagoya Railroad	
46	2006	100 series Linimo	Aichi Rapid Transit	
46	2006	5100 series Green Mover Max tramcar	Hiroshima Electric Railway	
46	2006	3000 series EMU	Fukuoka City Transportation Bureau	
47	2007	E233 series EMU	JR East	
47	2007	3000 series EMU	Nishi-Nippon Railroad	
48	2008	E721 series/SAT721 EMU	JR East/Sendai Airport Transit	
48	2008	KiHa E200 DMU	JR East	
49	2009	T1000 series tramcar	Toyohashi Railroad	
49	2009	3000 series Comfort Saloon EMU	Keihan Electric Railway	
50	2010	22600 series Ace EMU	Kintetsu	
51	2011	16000 series EMU	Tokyo Metro	
52	2012	Class HD300-900 hybrid locomotive	JR Freight	
53	2013	Not awarded	—N/a	
54	2014	E6 Series Shinkansen	JR East	
54	2014	F1000 series "Fukuram" tramcar	Fukui Railway	
55	2015	EV-E301 series battery EMU	JR East	
55	2015	3000 series EMU	Hakone Tozan Railway	
56	2016	HB-E210 series hybrid DMU	JR East	
56	2016	New 260 series EMU	Yokkaichi Asunarou Railway	
57	2017	E235 series EMU	JR East	
57	2017	ET122-1000 "Setsugekka" DMU	Echigo Tokimeki Railway	
57	2017	A3000 series EMU	Shizuoka Railway	
58	2018	E353 series EMU	JR East	
58	2018	500 series "Revaty" EMU	Tobu Railway	
58	2018	7500 series "U-Tram III" EMU	Kagoshima City Tram	
59	2019	20000 series EMU	Sagami Railway	
59	2019	Eizan Deo-730 railcar	Eizan Electric Railway	
60	2020	2700 series DMU	JR Shikoku	
61	2021	E261 series EMU	JR East	
61	2021	N700S Series Shinkansen	JR Central	
62	2022	17000 series EMU	Tokyo Metro	
62	2022	18000 series EMU	Tokyo Metro	
62	2022	3000 series "Premium Car"	Keihan Electric Railway	
63	2023	20 series EMU	Kyoto Municipal Subway	
64	2024	400 series EMU	Osaka Metro	
64	2024	HU300 series tramcar	Utsunomiya Light Rail	
65	2025	4000 series EMU	Fukuoka City Transportation Bureau	
65	2025	8A series EMU	Kintetsu	
66	2026	80000 series EMU	Tobu Railway	
66	2026	7000 series EMU	Iyotetsu	

== See also ==
- List of motor vehicle awards
- Blue Ribbon Award (railway)
