= Kintetsu 5800 series =

Japanese train type

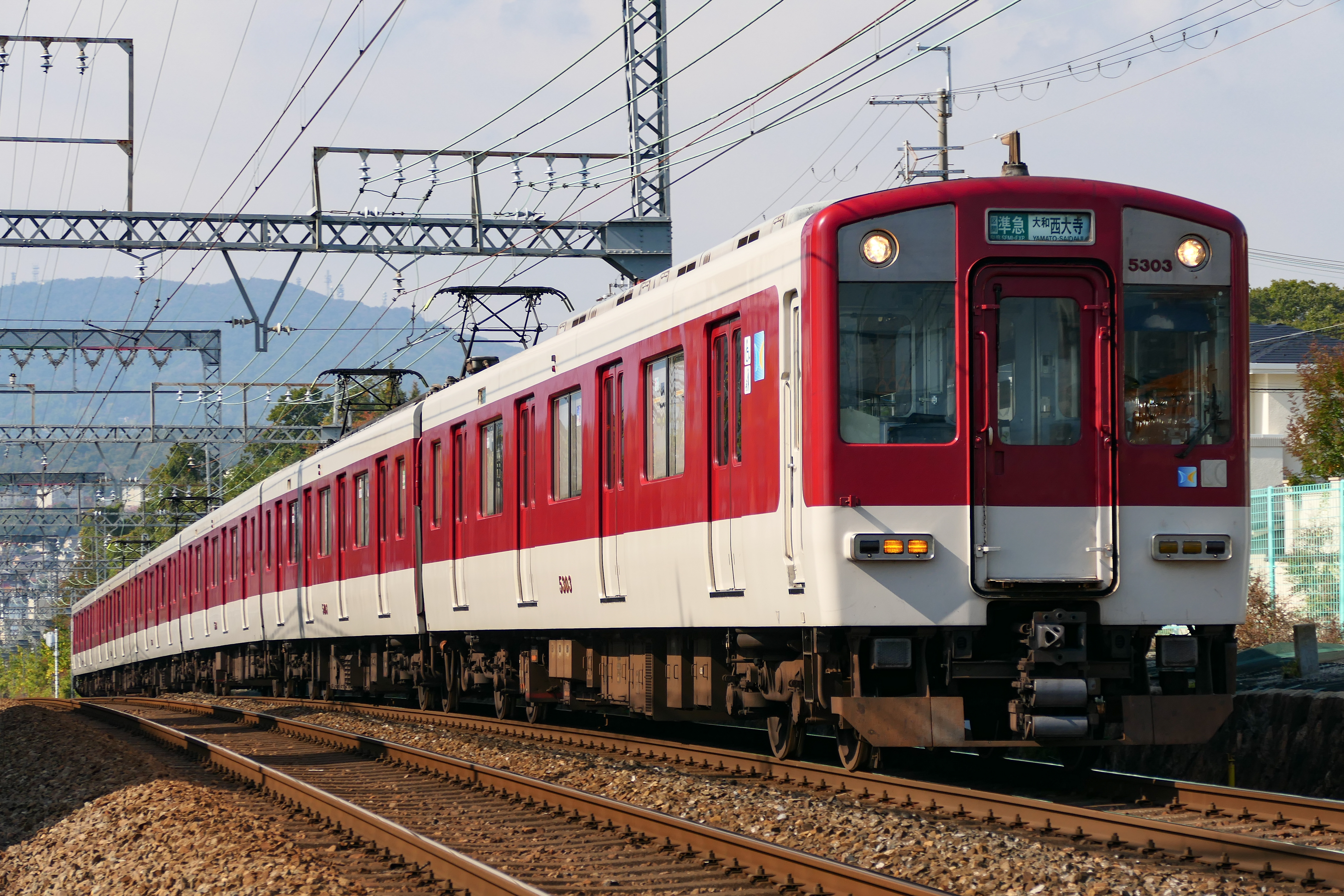
- A 5800 series trainset
- In service: 1998–present
- Manufacturer: Kinki Sharyo
- Number built: 46 vehicles (8 sets)
- Number in service: 46 vehicles (8 sets)
- Formation: 4/6 cars per trainset
- Fleet numbers: DH01–DH05, DF11, DG12, DF13
- Operators: Kintetsu Railway
- Depots: Saidaiji, Takayasu, Tomiyoshi
- Lines served: A Kintetsu Namba Line; A Kintetsu Nara Line; B Kintetsu Kyoto Line; B Kintetsu Kashihara Line; H Kintetsu Tenri Line; D Kintetsu Osaka Line; E Kintetsu Nagoya Line; M Kintetsu Yamada Line; M Kintetsu Toba Line; Hanshin Main Line; Hanshin Namba Line

Specifications
- Car body construction: Aluminum alloy
- Car length: 20,720 mm (68 ft 0 in)
- Width: 2,800 mm (9 ft 2 in)
- Height: 4,150 mm (13 ft 7 in)
- Doors: 4 pairs per side
- Maximum speed: 110 km/h (68 mph)
- Traction system: Mitsubishi Electric
- Power output: 165 kW per motor
- Acceleration: 2.6 km/(h⋅s) (1.6 mph/s)
- Deceleration: 4.0 km/(h⋅s) (2.5 mph/s)
- Electric system(s): 1,500 V DC, overhead line
- Current collector(s): Pantograph
- Multiple working: 9820 series
- Track gauge: 1,435 mm (4 ft 8 1/2 in)

The Kintetsu 5800 series (近鉄5800系), nicknamed the "L/C car", is an electric multiple unit (EMU) train type operated by the private railway operator Kintetsu Railway on standard gauge (1,435 mm (4 ft 8 1/2 in)) commuter services in the Kansai area since 1998.

The series won the Laurel Prize in 1998 by the Japan Railfan Club for having the most innovative features for trains entering service that year.

== Overview ==
Perpendicular seating has long been provided on long-distance services on the Osaka and Nagoya lines. In previous Kintetsu 2600 series trainsets and related counterparts, fixed perpendicular seats were a common feature on these services. However, passengers complained about their lack of comfort.

In the early to mid-1990s, the railway began experimenting with seats that could change between longitudinal (perimeter) and transverse (row) seating configurations. In January 1996, A 4-car 2600 series set would be retrofitted with rotating seats. During peak hours, the seats would be configured in the transverse configuration and then switch to longitudinal configuration during off-peak hours. By March of that year, the experiment was deemed a success and the feature would be implemented onto trains being ordered for the long-distance services.

The 5800 series trainsets would enter service in 1998 on the Osaka and Nagoya lines. One 4-car train and seven 6-car trains would be produced. These would also be the last trainsets to feature the signature conventional body design introduced in 1984, as Kintetsu would switch to a new body and livery starting with the 21 series introduced in 2000.

The series is the first to be delivered with rotating longitudinal/transverse seating. Other private railways such as Tobu, Keikyu, Keio, and Seibu would later implement rotating longitudinal/transverse seating on future rolling stock additions.

As of 2021, the seat configuration on all Kintetsu trains equipped with rotating seats is dependent on the line and time of day.

== Formations ==
As of 1 April 2016, the fleet consists of seven six-car sets and one four-car set, formed as follows.

=== Four-car set ===
The lone four-car set is allocated to Tomiyoshi Depot.

Designation	Mc	T-	M	Tc
Numbering	Mo 5800	Sa 5710	Mo 5600	Ku 5300

=== Six-car sets ===
Six-car sets are allocated to Koan Depot and Saidaiji Depot, each with three sets.

Designation	Mc	T-	M	T-	M	Tc
Numbering	Mo 5800	Sa 5700	Mo 5600	Sa 5500	Mo 5400	Ku 5300

== Interior ==
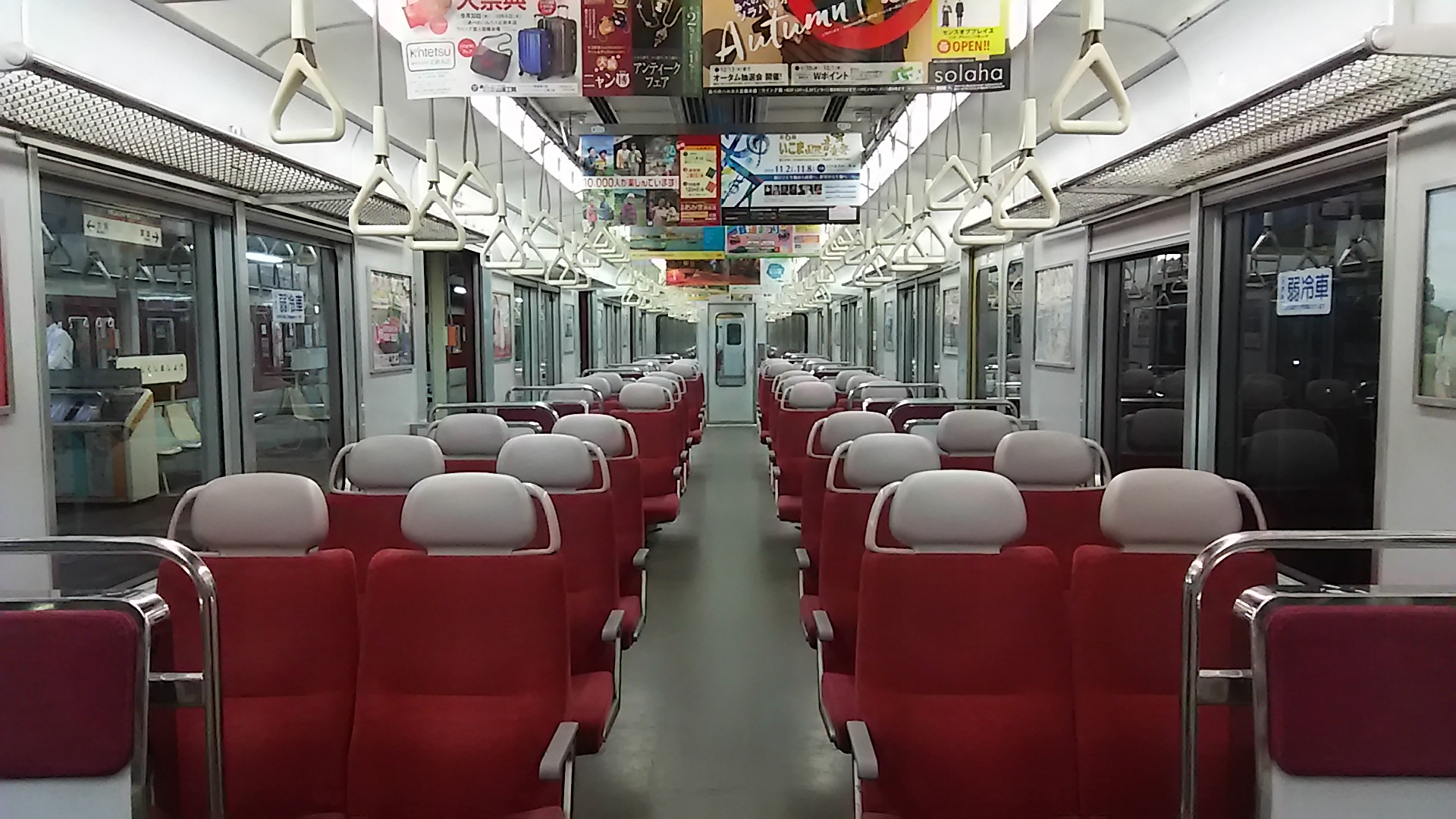
Current perpendicular seating configuration

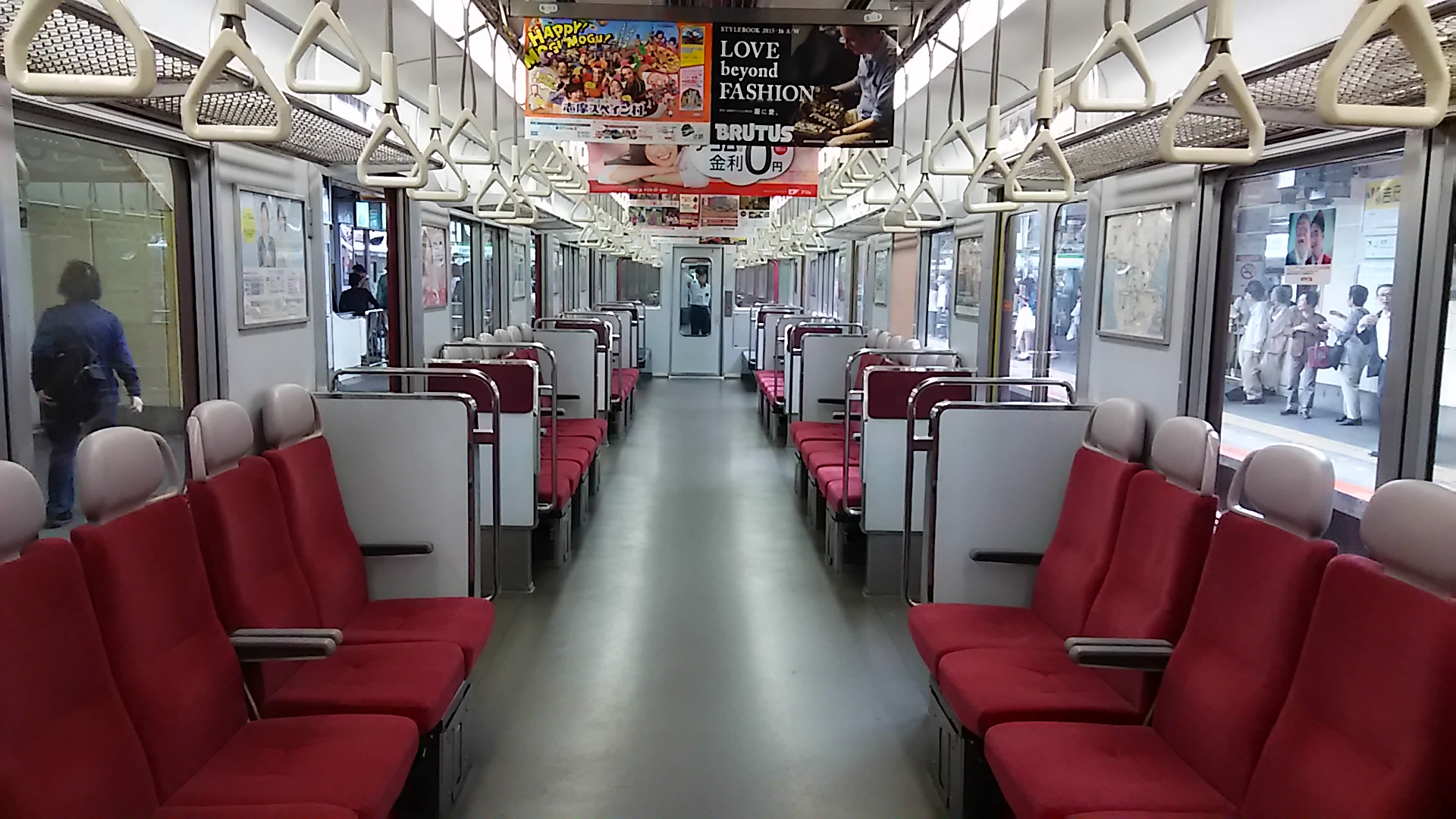
Current longitudinal seating configuration

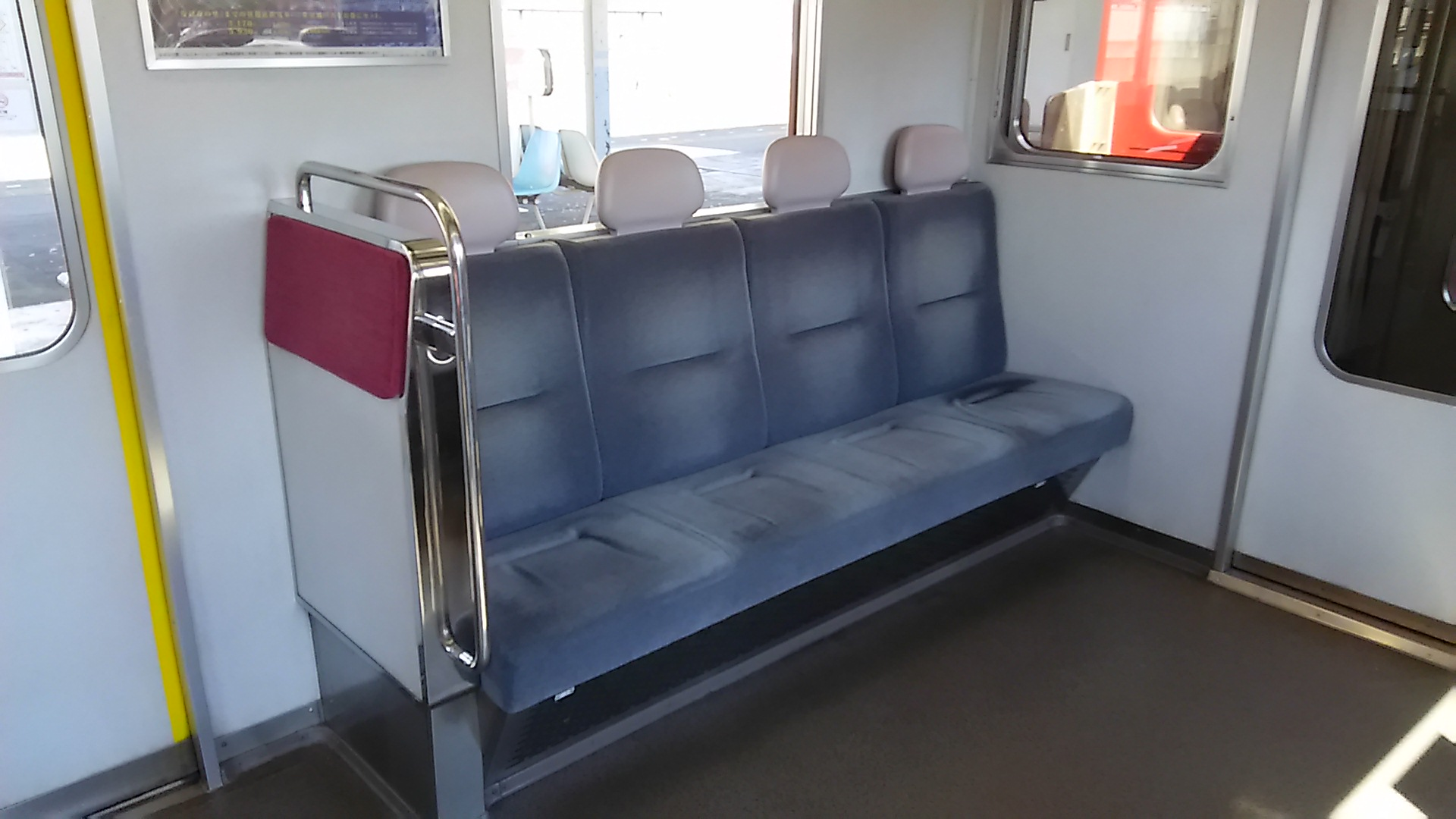
Perpendicular seating configuration located at the car end

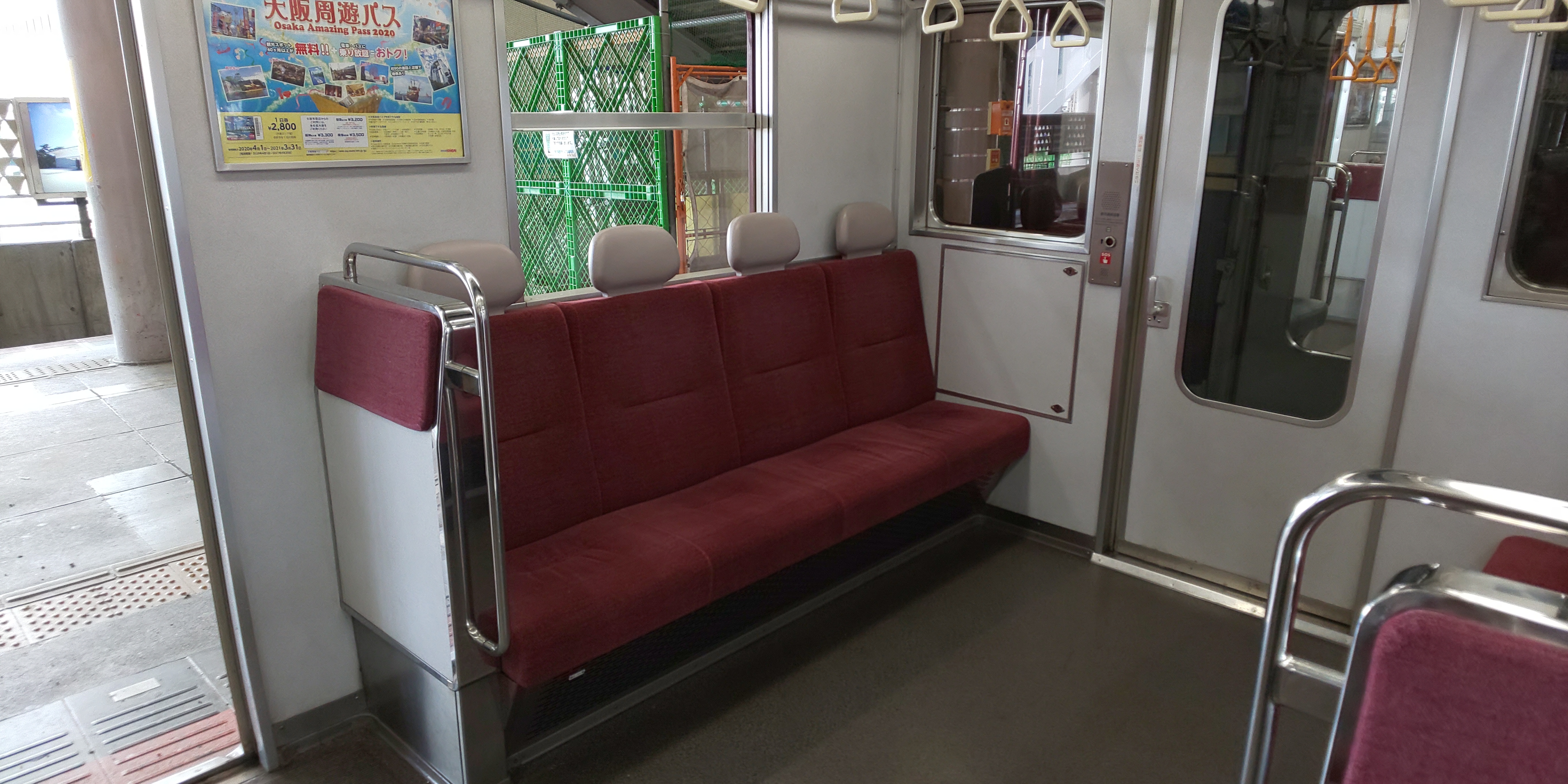
Rotating seats located at the car end

== Special liveries ==
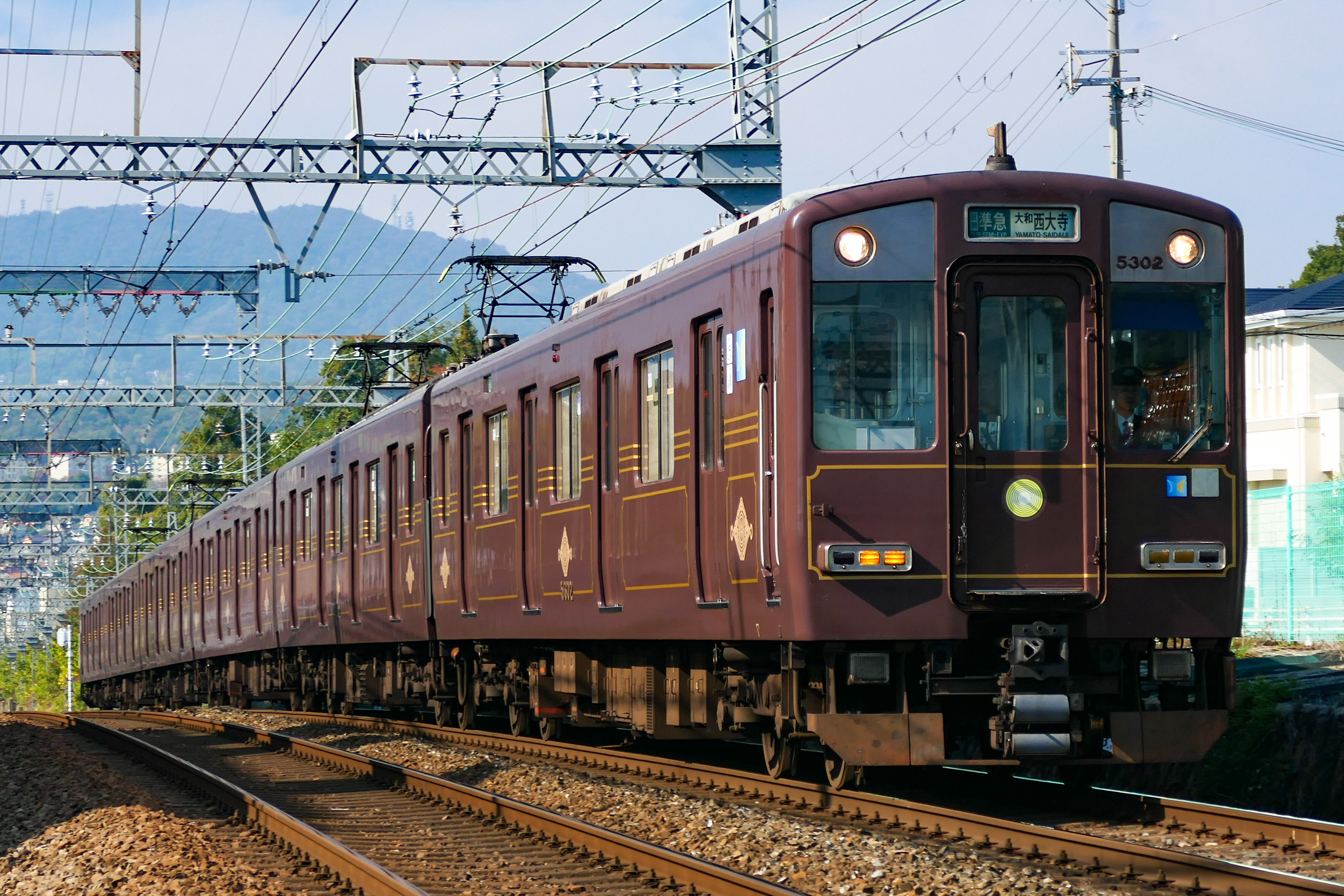
Set DH02 in DeBo 1-inspired "History Train" livery, November 2023

In 2014, to commemorate the 100th anniversary of the Nara Line's opening, set DH02 received a "History Train" livery inspired by the DeBo 1 series railcars originally used on the line. It carried this livery until February 2025.

== See also ==
- Seibu 40000 series, a Seibu Railway commuter EMU type that also features rotating longitudinal/transverse seating (some sets only)
- Tobu 50090 series and 70090 series, Tobu Railway commuter EMU types that also feature rotating longitudinal/transverse seating
- Keikyu 2100 series, a Keikyu commuter EMU type that also features transverse seating
- Keikyu N1000 series, another Keikyu commuter EMU type that also features rotating transverse seating (batches 20 and 21 only)
- Kintetsu 5820 series, a similar type with changing seat configurations operating for Kintetsu Railway, the curators of the design
