= Kintetsu 5820 series =

Japanese electric multiple unit train type

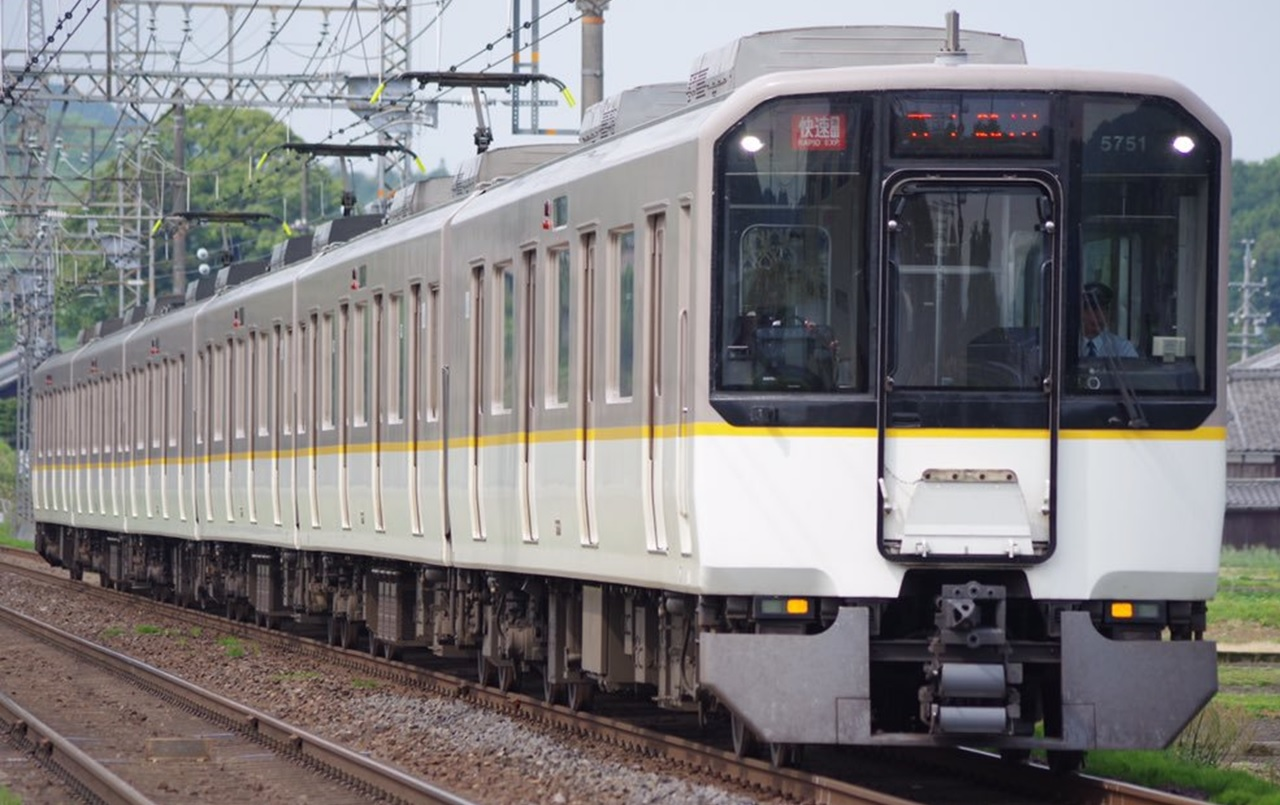
- A 5820 series on the Osaka Line
- Manufacturer: Kinki Sharyo
- Family name: Series 21
- Constructed: 2000–2003
- Entered service: 2000
- Number built: 42 vehicles (7 sets)
- Number in service: 42 vehicles (7 sets)
- Formation: 6 cars per trainset
- Fleet numbers: DH21 – DH25, DF51 – DF52
- Operators: Kintetsu Railway
- Depots: Saidaiji, Takayasu
- Lines served: A Nara Line; A Namba Line; B Kyoto Line; B Kashihara Line; H Tenri Line; D Osaka Line; M Yamada Line; M Toba Line; Hanshin Main Line; Hanshin Namba Line

Specifications
- Car body construction: Aluminium
- Car length: 20,720 mm (68 ft 0 in)
- Width: 2,800 mm (9 ft 2 in)
- Height: 4,150 mm (13 ft 7 in)
- Doors: 4 pairs per side
- Maximum speed: 110 km/h (70 mph)
- Traction system: Variable frequency (IGBT)
- Power output: 185 kW per motor
- Acceleration: 2.5 km/(h⋅s) (1.6 mph/s); 3.0 km/(h⋅s) (1.9 mph/s)
- Deceleration: 4.0 km/(h⋅s) (2.5 mph/s)
- Electric system(s): 1,500 V DC overhead line
- Current collection: Pantograph
- Bogies: KD-311
- Braking system(s): Electronically controlled pneumatic brakes
- Safety system(s): Kintetsu ATS (old/new); Hanshin ATS
- Track gauge: 1,435 mm (4 ft 8 1/2 in)

The Kintetsu 5820 series (近鉄5820系) is an electric multiple unit (EMU) commuter train type operated by the private railway operator Kintetsu Railway since 2000.

== Operations ==
The 5820 series sets mainly operate on Nara Line services, including through-running to and from Hanshin Electric Railway lines. In addition, two of these sets are set aside for operations on the Osaka Line.

== Formations ==
As of 1 April 2012, the fleet consists of seven six-car sets, with five sets based at Saidaiji Depot for Nara Line services, and two sets based at Takayasu Depot for use on Osaka Line services.

=== Saidaiji Depot sets ===
As of 1 April 2012, there are five six-car sets, based at Saidaiji Depot, formed as follows, with three motored (M) cars and three non-powered trailer (T) cars, and the 5720 car at the Namba/Kyoto end.

Designation	Tc	M		T	M	Tc
Numbering	Ku 5720	Mo 5820	Mo 5620	Sa 5520	Mo 5420	Ku 5320

The motored cars are each fitted with one cross-arm or single-arm pantograph.

=== Takayasu Depot sets ===
The two six-car Osaka Line sets are formed as follows, with three motored (M) cars and three non-powered trailer (T) cars, and the 5350 car at the Osaka end.

Designation	Tc	M	T	M		Tc
Numbering	Ku 5350	Mo 5450	Sa 5550	Mo 5650	Mo 5850	Ku 5750

The motored cars are each fitted with one cross-arm or single-arm pantograph.

== Interior ==
Passenger accommodation consists of longitudinal bench seating on the ends of each car. The sections between the doors can be rotated into either a 2+2 perpendicular configuration or a six-seat longitudinal configuration.

A western-style toilet is installed on the Osaka Line sets.

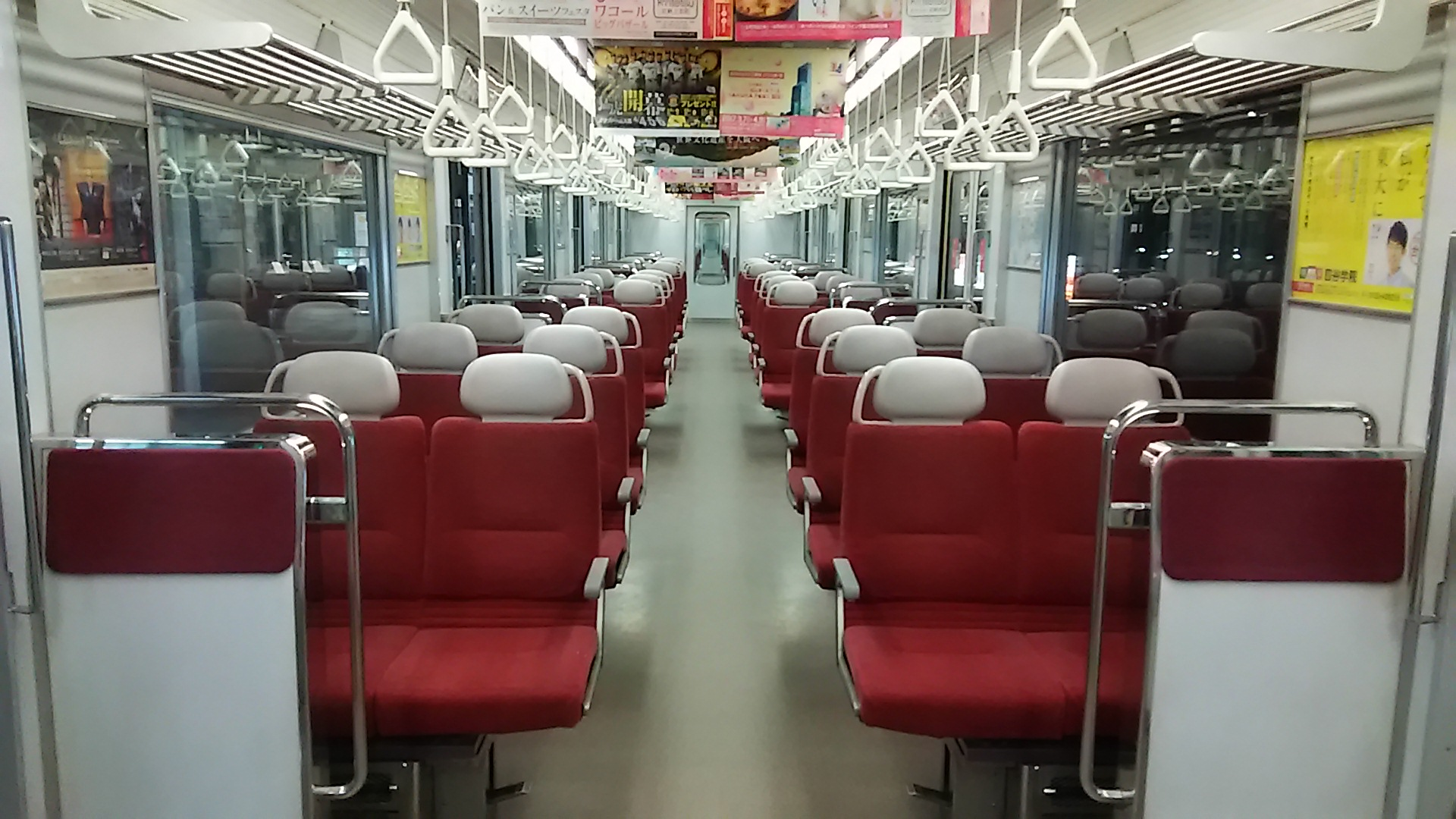
2+2 perpendicular configuration

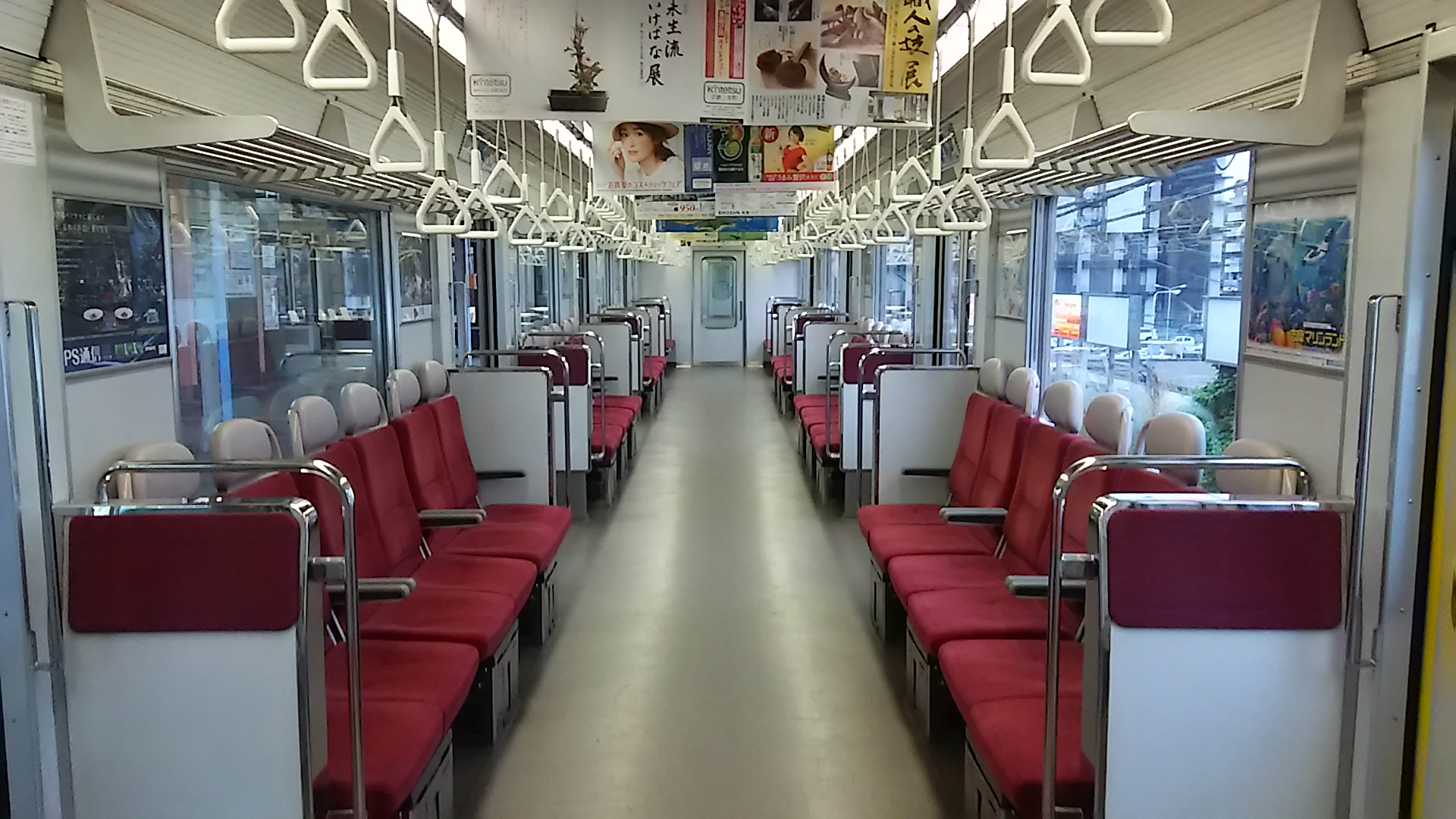
Longitudinal configuration

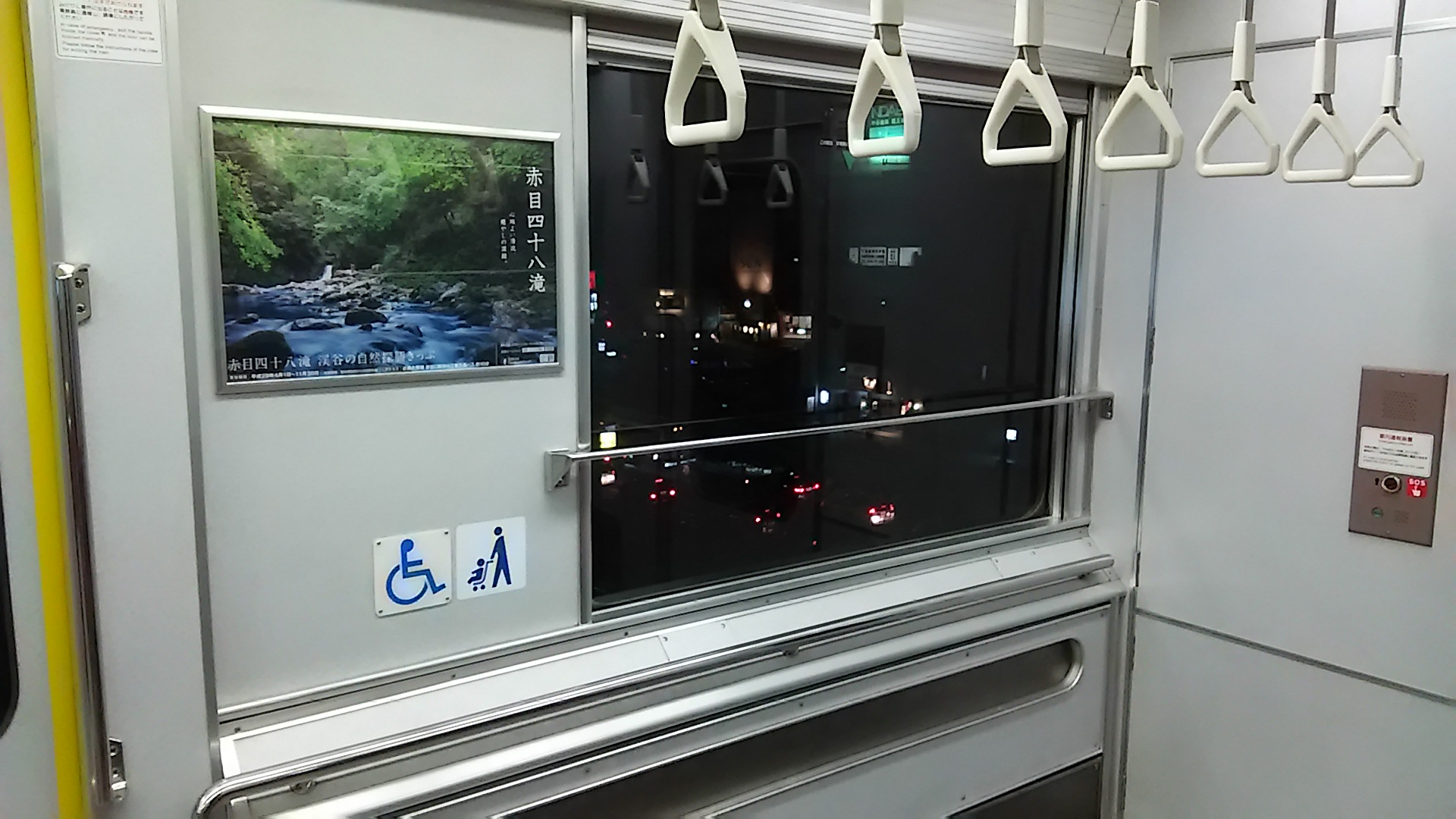
Wheelchair space at the end of the car

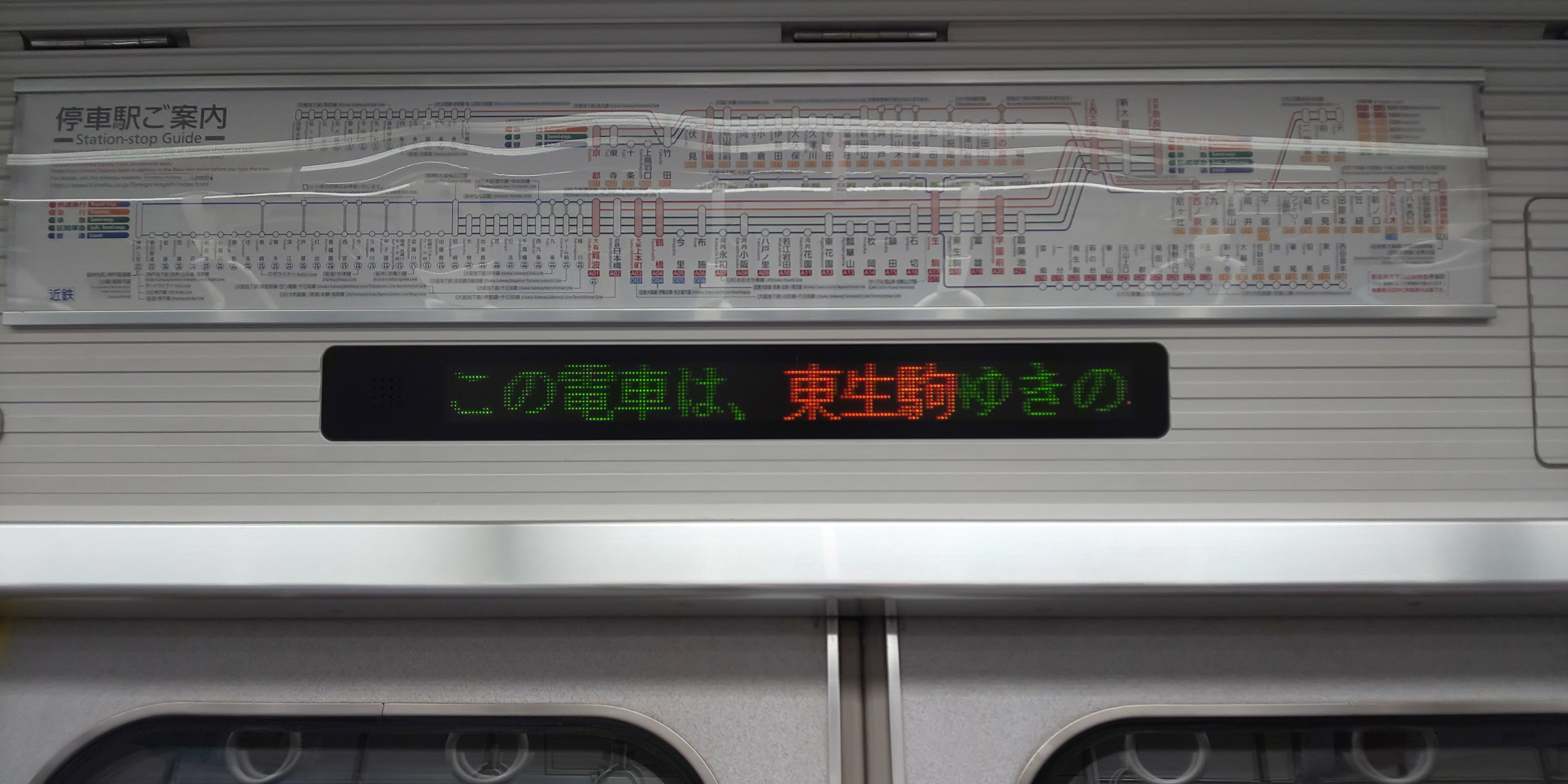
Passenger info display

== See also ==
=== Kansai ===
- Kintetsu 6820 series, a narrow-gauge 2-car derivative of the 9020 series
- Kintetsu 9020 series, similar two-car sets
- Kintetsu 9820 series, similar six-car sets with permanent longitudinal seating throughout
- Kintetsu 3220 series

=== Kanto ===
- Tobu 50090 series and 70090 series, Tobu Railway commuter EMU types that also features rotating longitudinal/transverse seating
- Keio 5000 series, a Keio commuter EMU type that also features rotating longitudinal/transverse seating
- Keikyu 2100 series, a Keikyu commuter EMU type that also features transverse seating
- Keikyu 1000 series, another Keikyu commuter EMU type also features rotating transverse seating (batch 20 only)
