= 3220 =

3220 may refer to:

- A.D. 3220, a year in the 4th millennium CE
- 3220 BC, a year in the 4th millennium BCE
- 3220, a number in the 3000 (number) range

== Products ==
- ALFA-PROJ Model 3220, a handgun
- Kintetsu 3220 series, an electric multiple unit train class
- Nokia 3220, a cellphone

== Roads numbered 3220 ==
- Louisiana Highway 3220, a state highway
- Texas Farm to Market Road 3220, a state highway
- A3220 road, a road in London, England, UK

== Other uses ==
- 3220 Murayama, an asteroid in the Asteroid Belt, the 3220th asteroid registered

== See also ==
- USS West Gambo (ID-3220), a WWI U.S. Navy cargo ship
