= Kintetsu 3220 series =

Japanese electric multiple unit train type

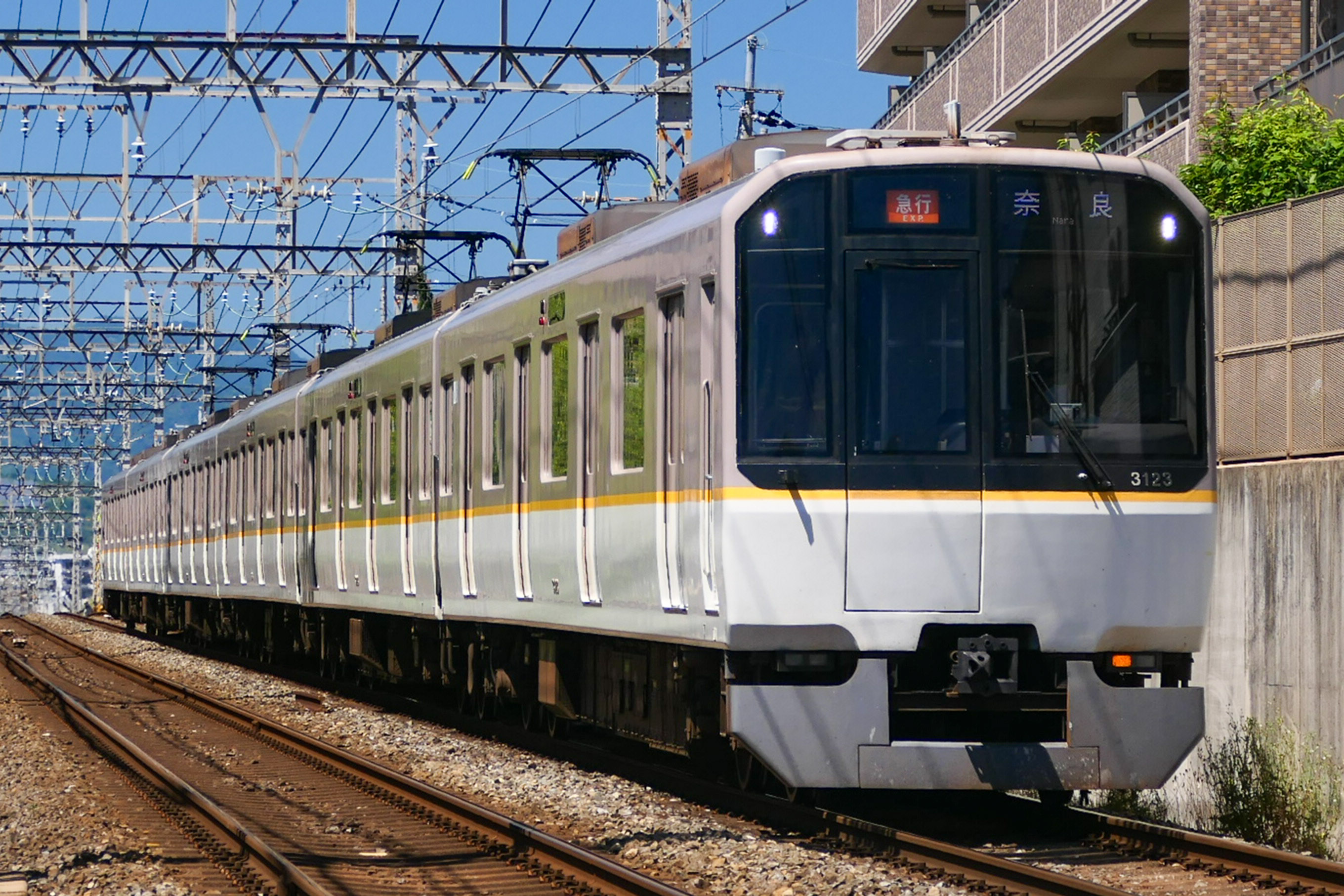
- A 3220 series on a service to Nara
- Manufacturer: Kinki Sharyo
- Family name: Series 21
- Constructed: 2000
- Entered service: 2000
- Number built: 18 vehicles (3 sets)
- Number in service: 18 vehicles (3 sets)
- Formation: 6 cars per trainset
- Fleet numbers: KL21 – KL23
- Operator: Kintetsu Railway
- Depot: Saidaiji
- Lines served: A Nara Line; A Namba Line; B Kyoto Line; B Kashihara Line; H Tenri Line; D Osaka Line; Karasuma Line

Specifications
- Car body construction: Aluminium
- Car length: 20,500 mm (67 ft 3 in)
- Width: 2,800 mm (9 ft 2 in)
- Height: 4,110 mm (13 ft 6 in)
- Doors: 4 pairs per side
- Maximum speed: 105 km/h (65 mph); 75 km/h (45 mph) (Karasuma Line)
- Traction system: MB-5085A
- Power output: 185 kW per motor
- Electric system: 1,500 V DC overhead line
- Current collection: Pantograph
- Bogies: Bolsterless: KD311 (powered); KD311A (unpowered)
- Braking system: Electronically controlled air brakes
- Safety system: Kintetsu ATS
- Track gauge: 1,435 mm (4 ft 8 1/2 in)

The Kintetsu 3220 series (近鉄3220系) is an electric multiple unit (EMU) commuter train type operated by the private railway operator Kintetsu Railway since 2000.

== Background ==
The 3220 series is the first member of Kintetsu's Series 21 (シリーズ21) commuter train lineup, the concept of which was to be a human-friendly, environmentally conscious, and reduced-cost train that was intended to "set the standard for the 21st century". The 3220 series was designed for use on Karasuma Subway Line inter-running services, and like the 3200 series trains that are also used on these services, feature left-offset front-end emergency exits. Kintetsu has since introduced further Series 21 variants, including the two-car 9020 series; the six-car 5820 series, which features rotating transverse seating; and the 6820 series, which operates on the narrow-gauge Minami Osaka Line.

== Operations ==
Entering service on 15 March 2000, the 3220 series sets mainly operate on Kyoto Line services, including through-running to and from the Karasuma Subway Line. Operation is limited to east of Sakuragawa Station on Nara/Namba line services as the trains lack the safety devices required on the Hanshin Line.

== Formations ==
As of April 2019, the fleet consists of three six-car sets, with all sets based at Saidaiji Depot mainly for Kyoto Line services. The sets are formed with three motored (M) cars and three non-powered trailer (T) cars, and the 3720 car at the Namba/Kyoto end.

Designation	Tc	M	M	T	M	Tc
Numbering	Ku 3720	Mo 3820	Mo 3620	Sa 3520	Mo 3220	Ku 3120
Weight (t)	32.0	35.0	35.0	27.0	35.0	32.0
Capacity (total)	141/40	155/48	155/48	155/48	155/48	141/40

The Mo 3220 car is fitted with two cross-arm pantographs while the rest of the M cars are fitted with one single-arm pantograph.

== Special liveries ==
Since their introduction into service, 3220 series sets KL22 and KL23 were wrapped in a "Kyoto-Nara" livery to promote the commencement of through services onto the Karasuma Subway Line. Set KL22 carried the livery until April 2011, and set KL23 until July of that year.

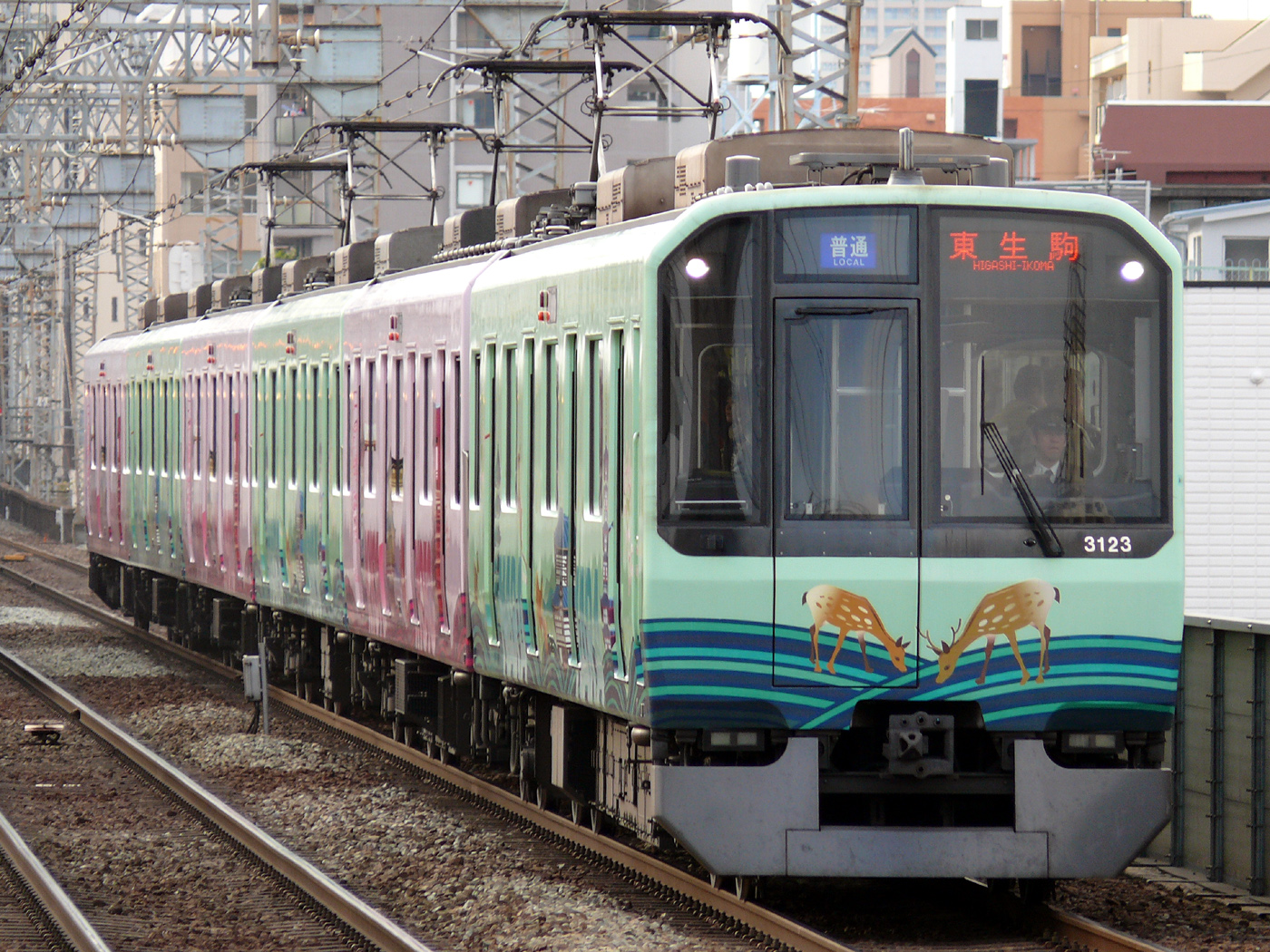
Set KL23 wrapped in a commemorative wrap to promote the start of thru-services onto the Karasuma Subway Line

== Gallery ==
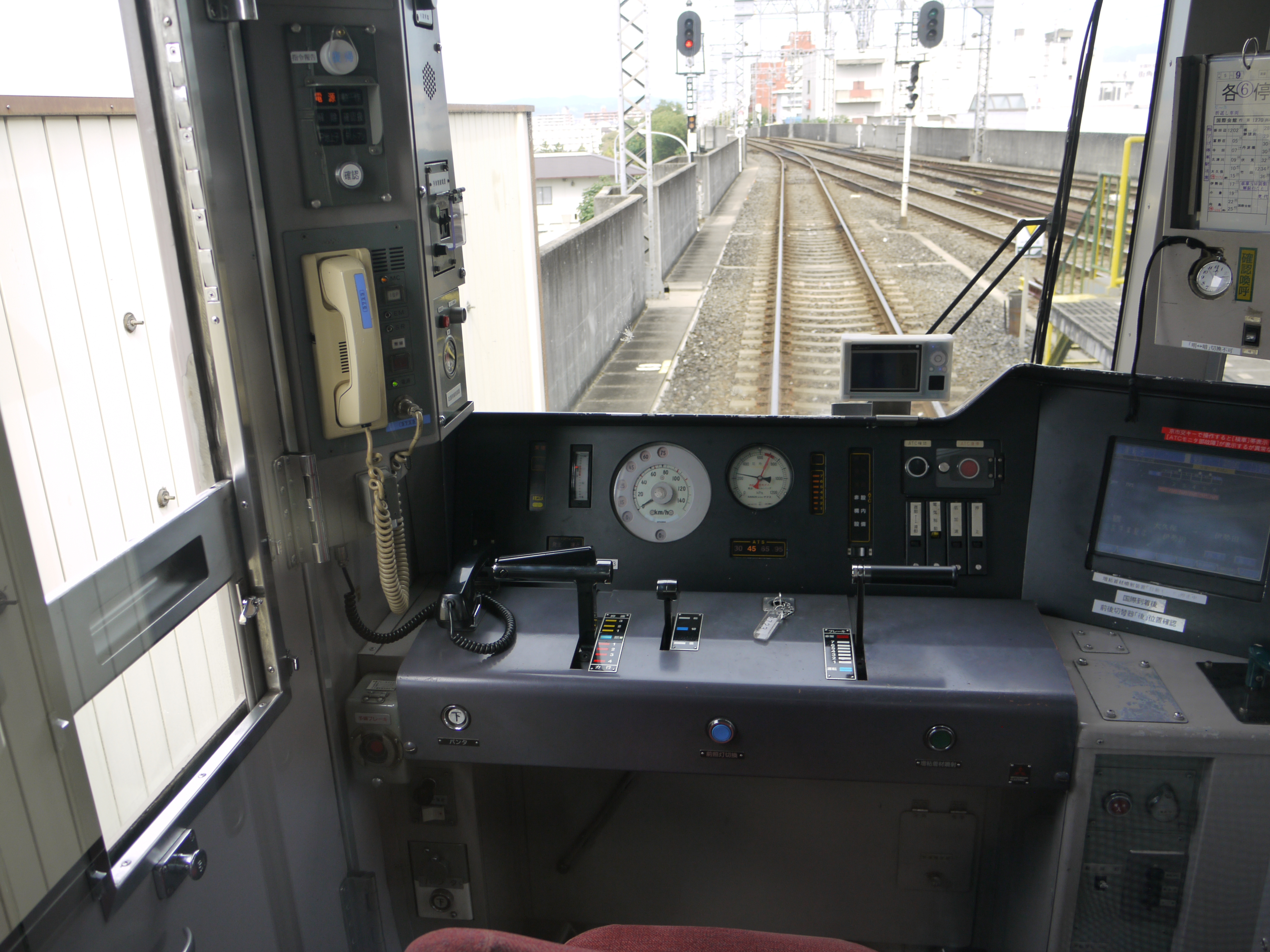
Cab view of 3723

== See also ==
- Kintetsu 5820 series, a similar 6-car derivative capable of rotating seat formations
- Kintetsu 6820 series, a narrow-gauge 2-car derivative of the 9020 series
- Kintetsu 9020 series, similar two-car sets
- Kintetsu 9820 series, similar six-car sets with permanent longitudinal seating throughout
