= Sanyo 3000 series =

Japanese train type

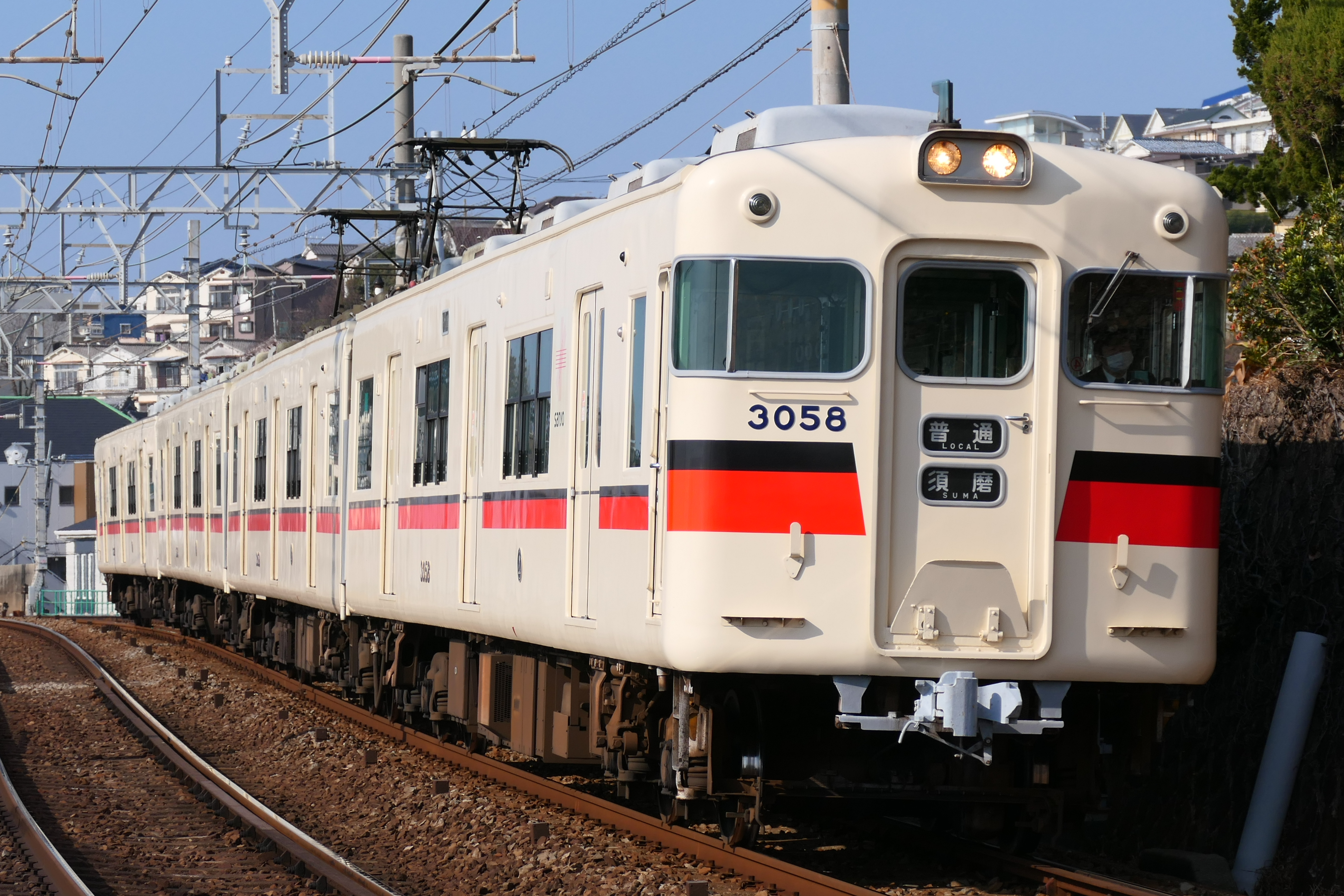
- Set 3058 in January 2021
- Manufacturer: Kawasaki Sharyō
- Constructed: 1964–1985
- Entered service: 1964
- Refurbished: 2005–2016 (for selected trains)
- Scrapped: 2016–
- Number built: 133 vehicles
- Formation: 3 & 4 cars per trainset
- Operator: Sanyo Electric Railway

Specifications
- Car body construction: Aluminium, steel
- Doors: 3 pairs per side
- Electric system: 1,500 V DC overhead lines
- Current collection: Pantograph
- Track gauge: 1,435 mm (4 ft 8 1/2 in)

The Sanyo Electric Railway 3000 series (山陽電鉄3000系, San'yō Dentetsu 3000-kei) is an electric multiple unit (EMU) train type operated by the private railway operator Sanyo Electric Railway in Japan since 1964. The 3000 series also includes the 3050 series (3050系), and the 3200 series (3200系).

== Formation ==
The trains are formed as three-car and four-car sets.

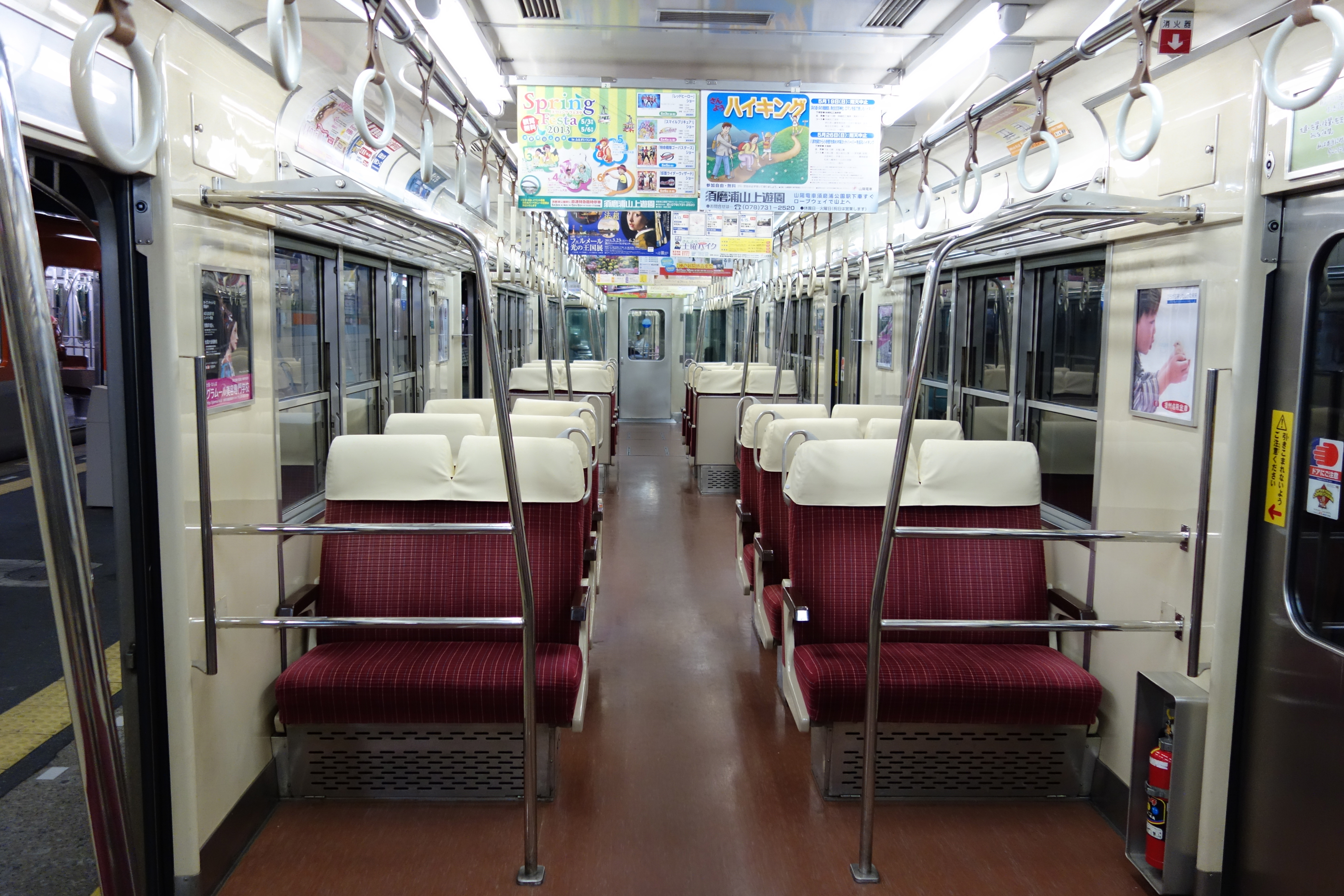
Interior with transverse seating

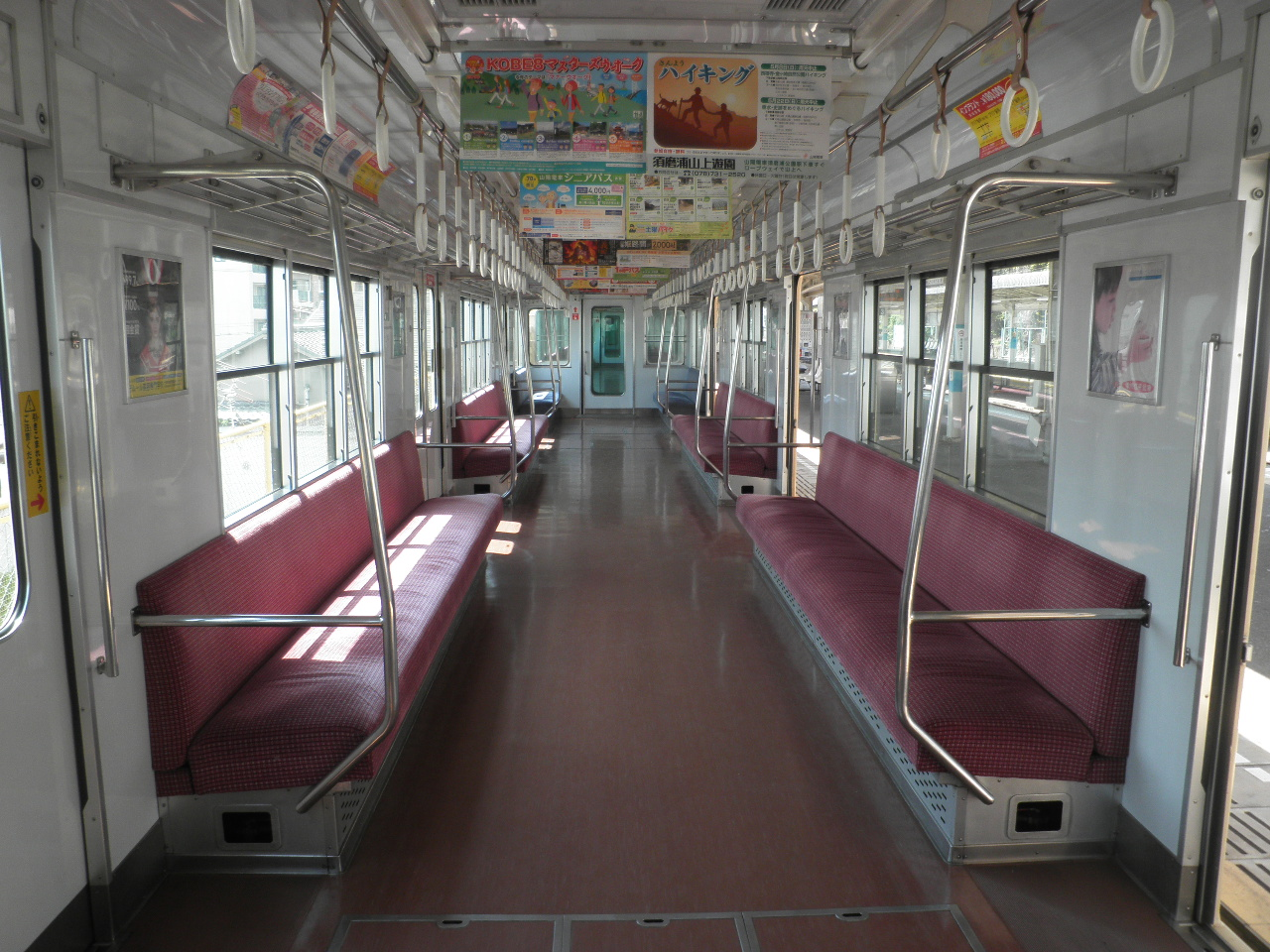
Interior with longitudinal seating

== Technical specifications ==
The trains have aluminium and steel car bodies. Steel-bodied trains had a cream and blue two-tone livery, and now carry an ivory livery with a black and red stripe. Most cars with aluminium bodies were unpainted with a red stripe. Aluminium cars which ran together with steel-bodied cars carried a livery.

== History ==
The trains entered service in 1964, and were the recipient of the 1965 Laurel Prize. 133 cars were built until 1985. They are being gradually replaced by 6000 series trains.

A special "Sayonara No. 3000" event was held for the withdrawal of set 3000 on November 23, 2017. The set, consisting of cars 3000, 3001 and 3600, entered service in 1965, and was withdrawn from regular service on November 22, followed by special runs on November 23, 2017. During its 53 years in service it ran a distance of about 6.42 million kilometers. Cars 3001 and 3600 were removed from Higashi-Futami depot for scrapping in March 2018.

Set 3030 was repainted into its original two-tone livery in 2019. It is scheduled to carry this livery until its planned withdrawal from service in 2021.

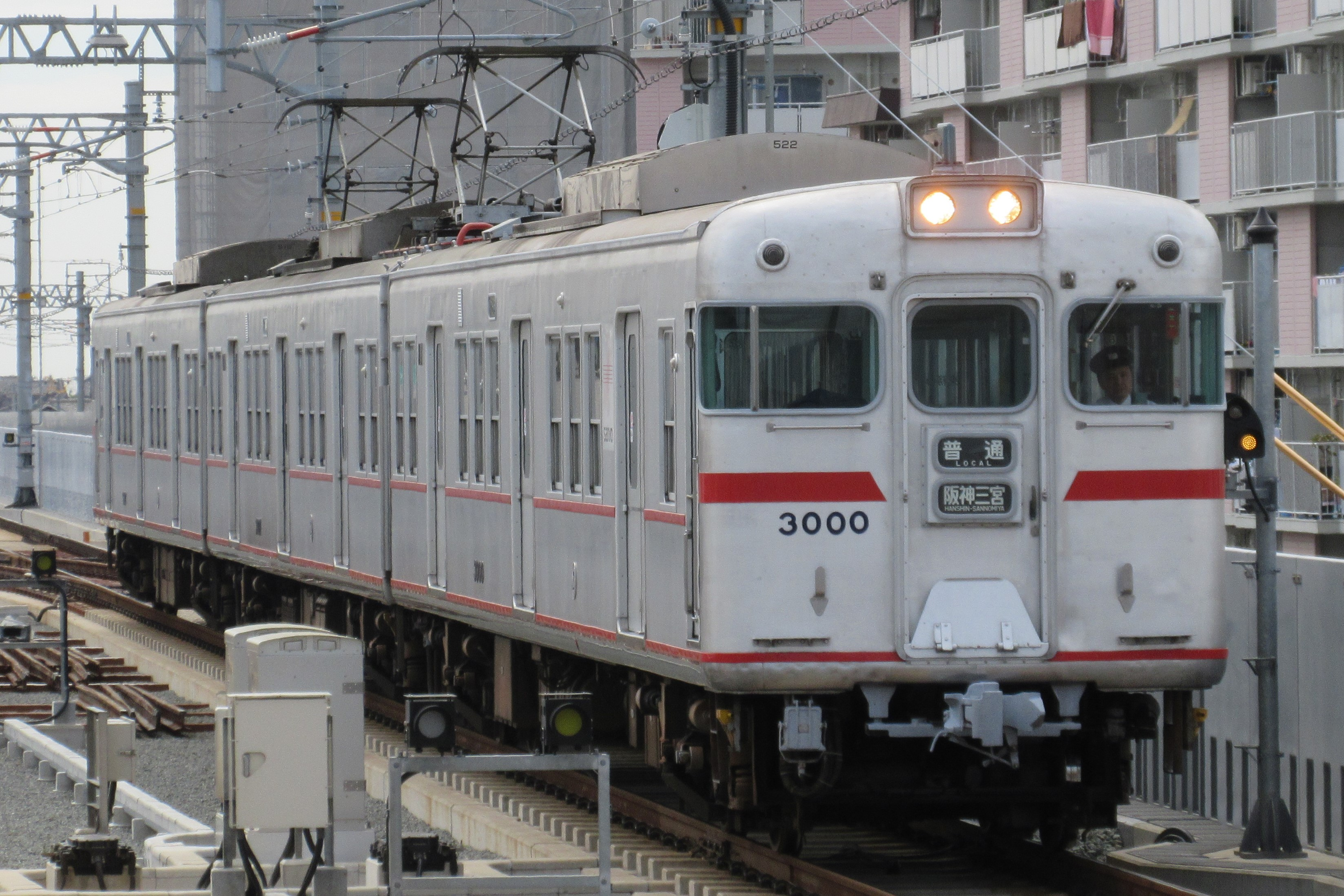
3000 in May 2017

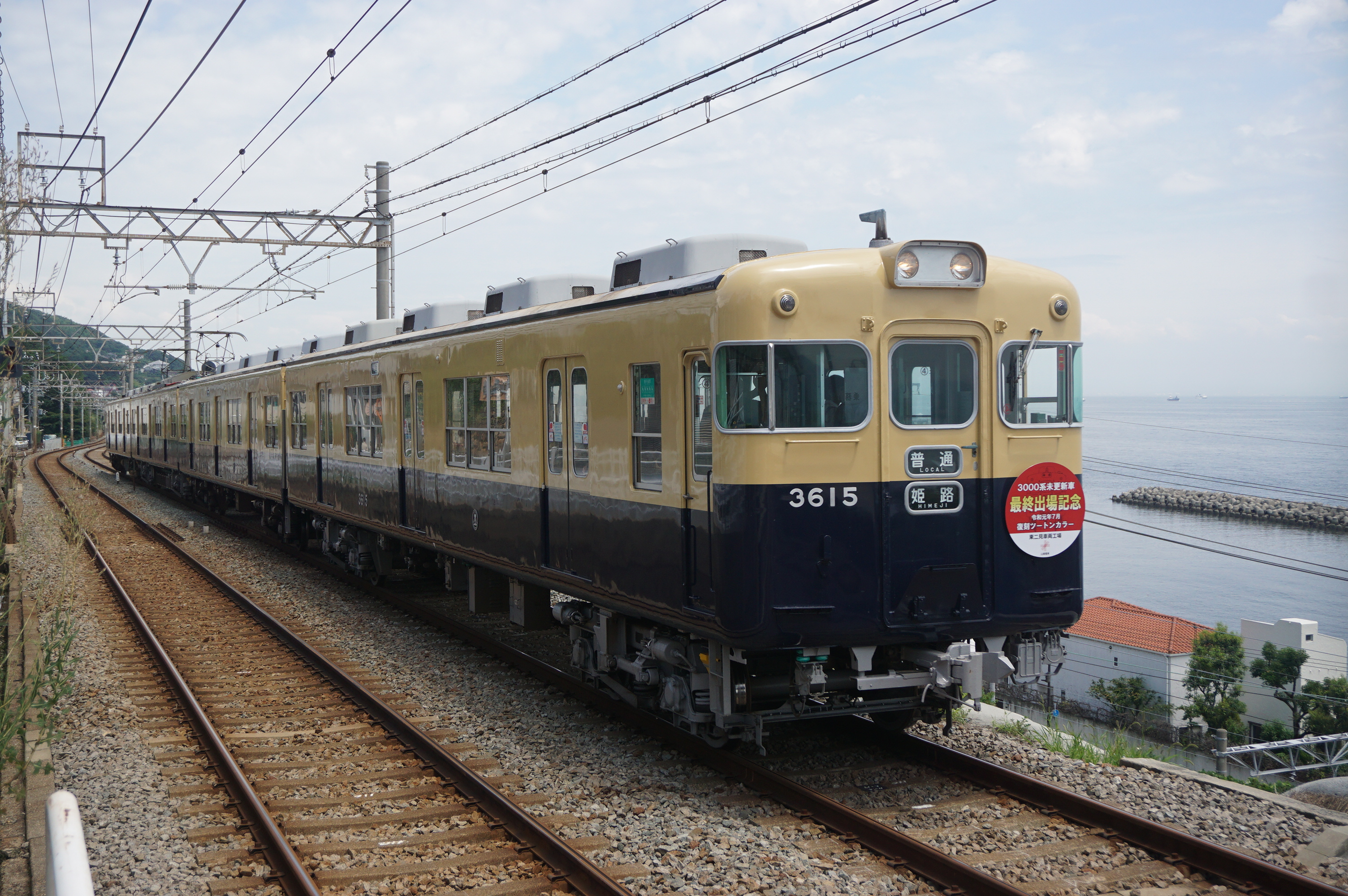
Set 3030 in July 2019
