= Sapporo Municipal Subway 6000 series =

Japanese train type

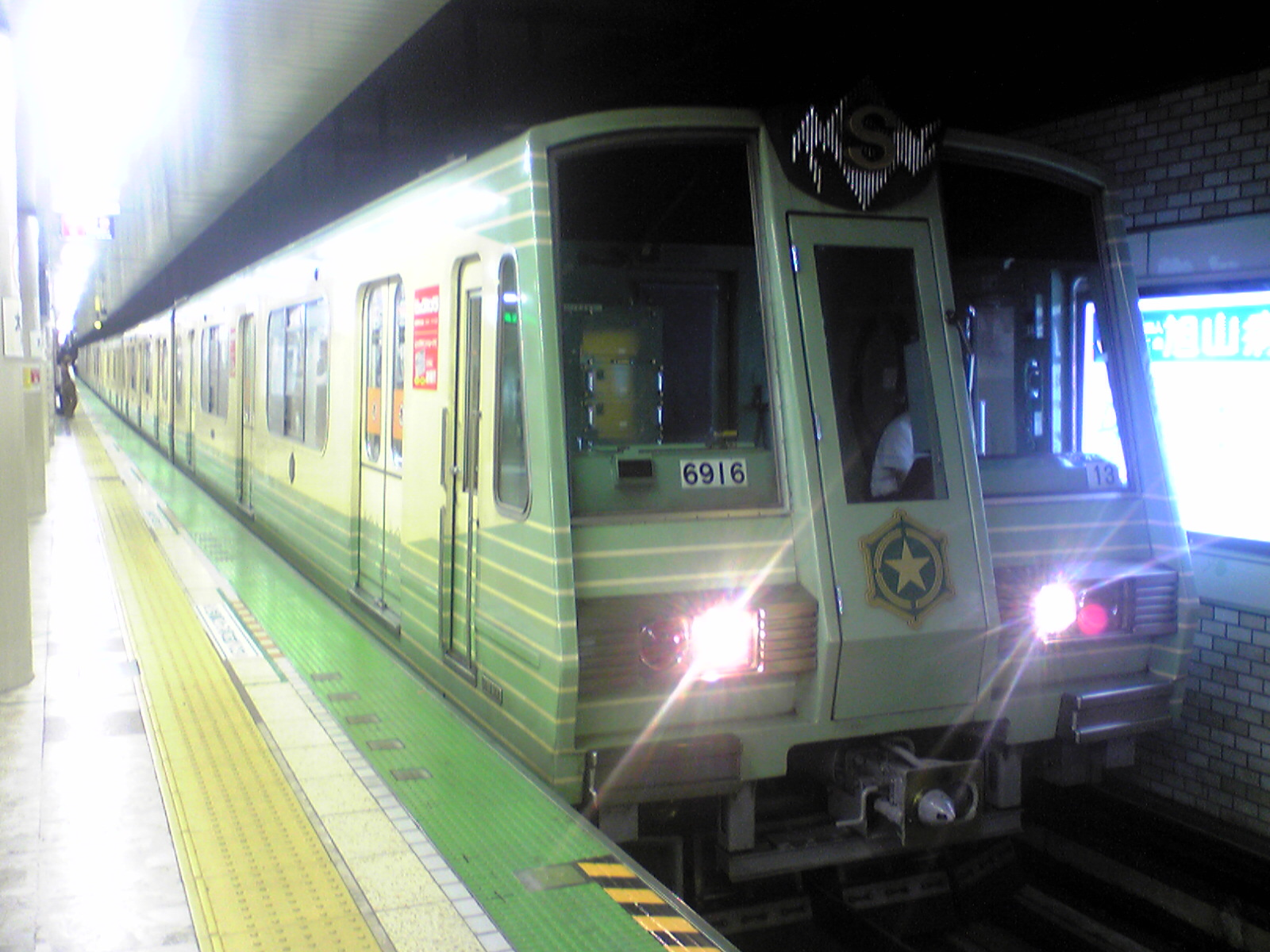
- Set 6016 in July 2008
- In service: June 1976 – August 2008
- Manufacturer: Kawasaki Heavy Industries
- Constructed: 1975 – 1982
- Entered service: 10 June 1976
- Scrapped: 2002 – 2008
- Number built: 168 vehicles (24 sets)
- Number in service: 24 vehicles (8300 series)
- Number scrapped: 144 vehicles
- Formation: 7 cars per trainset
- Fleet numbers: 6101-6124
- Capacity: 870 (346 seated)
- Operators: Sapporo Municipal Subway
- Lines served: Tōzai Line

Specifications
- Train length: 180 m (590 ft 7 in)
- Width: 3.08 m (10 ft 1 in)
- Height: 4.055 m (13 ft 3.6 in) (61xx cars); 3.915 m (12 ft 10.1 in) (62xx/64xx/69xx cars); 4.065 m (13 ft 4.0 in) (63xx/66xx/83xx cars)
- Floor height: 1.33 m (4 ft 4 in)
- Doors: 3 pairs per side
- Maximum speed: 70 km/h (43.5 mph)
- Traction system: Chopper control + Reverse conducting thyristor Variable frequency (IGBT) (83xx cars)
- Acceleration: 3.5 km/(h⋅s) (2.2 mph/s)
- Deceleration: 4.0 km/(h⋅s) (2.5 mph/s) (service); 4.8 km/(h⋅s) (3.0 mph/s) (emergency)
- Electric system(s): 1,500 V DC overhead conductor rail
- Current collection: Pantograph
- UIC classification: Bo'Bo'+2'2'+2'2'+Bo'Bo'+Bo'Bo'+2'2'+Bo'Bo'
- Braking system(s): Regenerative braking
- Safety system(s): ATC
- Track gauge: (Rubber tyre)

The Sapporo Municipal Subway 6000 series (札幌市交通局6000形) was a DC electric multiple unit (EMU) rubber-tyred metro train type operated by Sapporo Municipal Subway on the Tōzai Line in the city of Sapporo, Japan, from June 1976 to August 2008.

== Design ==
The trains are built by Kawasaki Heavy Industries and use chopper control with a reverse conducting thyristor. The 8300 series cars that were inserted later used a variable-frequency drive, provided by either Mitsubishi or Hitachi. Due to the use of both chopper-controlled and variable frequency drive-controlled cars in the 6000 series, this gave the 6000 series a unique sound on propulsion.

== Formations ==
The 6000 series trains are formed as seven-car sets as shown below.

Car No.	1	2	3	4	5	6	7
Designation	Mc2	Tc2	T	M	M2'	Tc1	Mc1
Numbering	6100	6200	6300	6400	8300	6600	6900
Weight (t)	25.5	23.2	23.5		27.3	23.5	25.3
Capacity (total/seated)	116/44	126/50	126/52		134/52	126/52	116/44

== Interior ==
Passenger accommodation consists of longitudinal bench seating throughout, with a wheelchair space in each car. The 8300 series cars that were introduced later have an interior that is very similar to that of the 8000 series cars.

== History ==
The first prototype cars were manufactured in 1975, and had a shape remarkably similar to that of the older 2000 series, followed by 20 more full-production sets in 1976. The trains began operation on 10 June 1976 with the opening of the stretch between Kotoni Station and Shiroishi Station and originally operated as four-car sets; however, when the stretch between Shiraishi and Shin-Sapporo Station opened on 21 March 1982, four more sets were delivered, this time as six-car sets, with the rest of the 4-car sets having additional cars added to make up a 6-car consist.

A seventh car known as the 8300 series was added to all sets starting from March 1999; the 8300 series were designed as such so that they could continue to be useful even when the 6000 series was completely withdrawn. This would prove true as the 6000 series would slowly be retired from 2002 onwards, as the new 8000 series cars began to replace them. The last remaining set, 6116, remained in service until 30 August 2008, after which it was retired. The 8300 series cars were later modified and fitted into various 8000 series sets and are still being used today.

The 6000 series was one of the two recipients of the 1977 Laurel Prize.

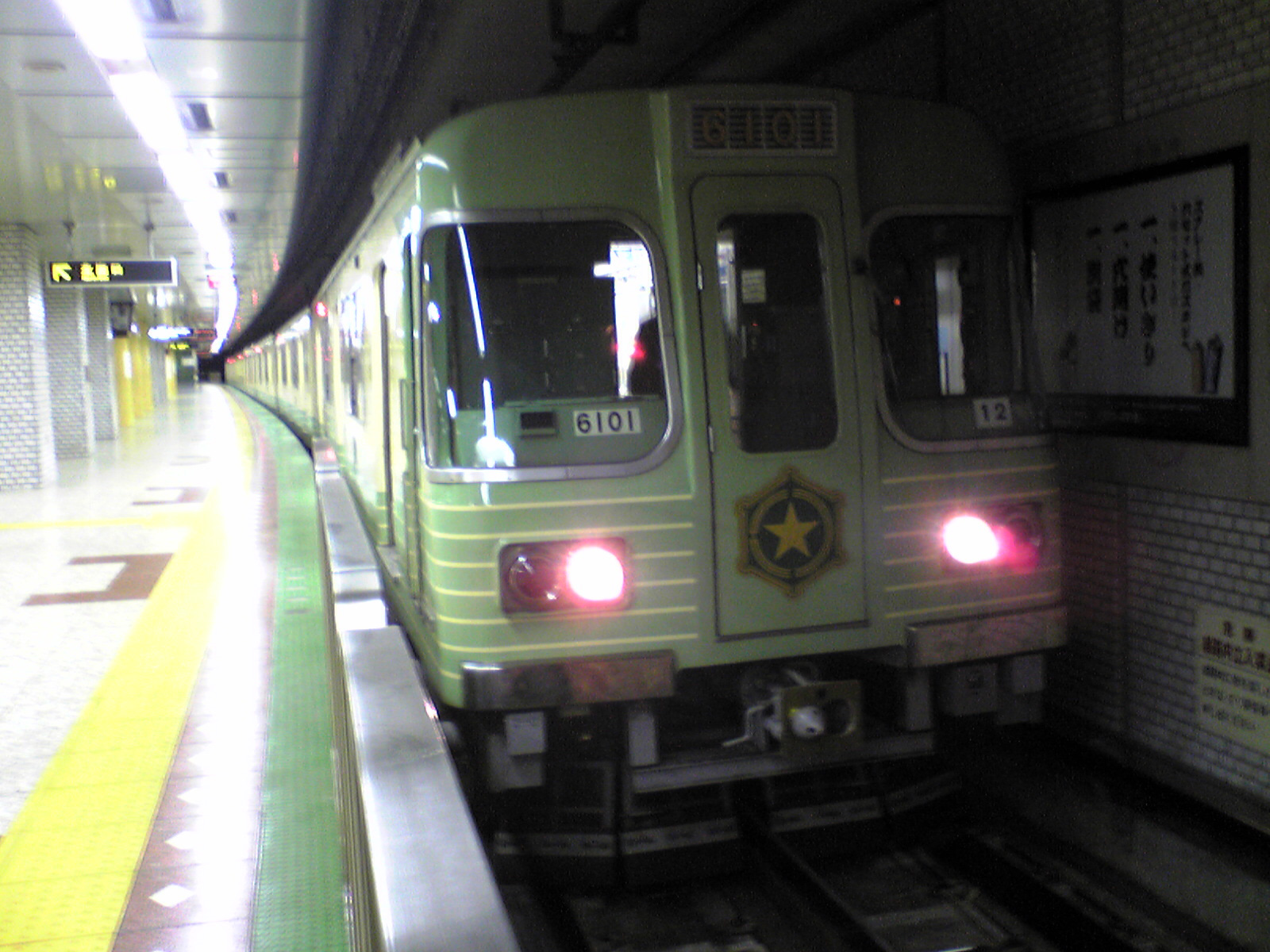
Prototype set 6101 in September 2007
