= Kintetsu 7000 series =

Japanese train type

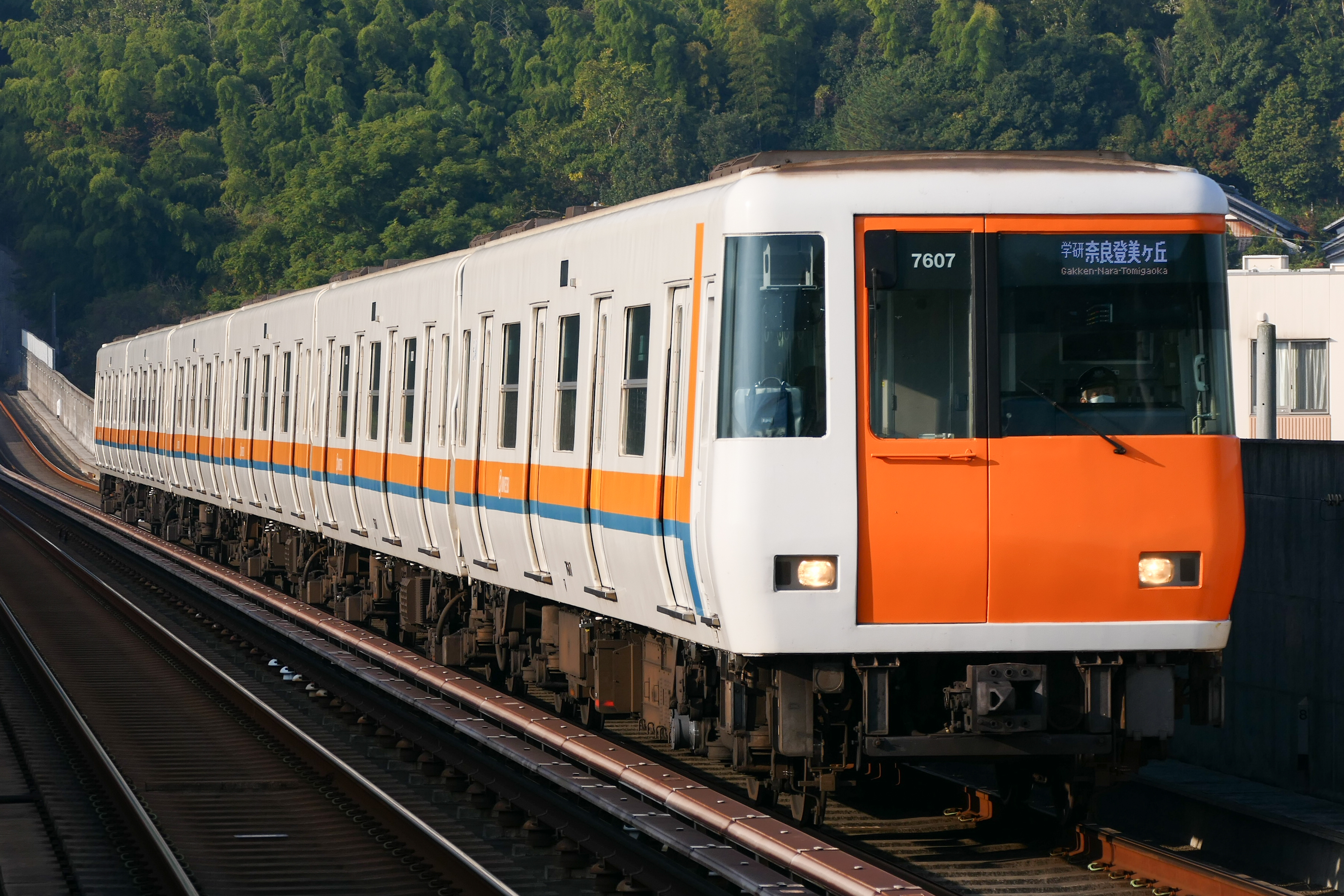
- A 7000 series train, November 2023
- In service: 1986–
- Manufacturer: Kinki Sharyo
- Family name: Super Electronic Commuter
- Constructed: 1984–1989
- Entered service: 1 October 1986
- Refurbished: 2004
- Number built: 54 vehicles (9 sets)
- Number in service: 54 vehicles (9 sets)
- Formation: 6 cars per trainset
- Fleet numbers: HL01 – HL09
- Operator: Kintetsu Railway
- Depot: Higashihanazono
- Lines served: C Kintetsu Keihanna Line; Osaka Metro Chūō Line

Specifications
- Car body construction: Steel
- Car length: 19,000 mm (62 ft 4 in)
- Width: 2,900 mm (9 ft 6 in)
- Doors: 4 pairs per side
- Maximum speed: 95 km/h (59 mph) on the Kintetsu Keihanna Line; 70 km/h (43 mph) on the Osaka Municipal Subway Chuo Line
- Traction system: Variable frequency (GTO) (except Set 7008); Variable frequency (IGBT) (Set 7008)
- Power output: 140 kW per motor
- Acceleration: 3.0 km/(h⋅s) (1.9 mph/s)
- Electric system: 750 V DC
- Current collection: Third rail
- Bogies: KD-92
- Braking system: Electronically controlled pneumatic brakes
- Safety system: ATC
- Track gauge: 1,435 mm (4 ft 8 1/2 in)

The Kintetsu 7000 series (近鉄7000系) is a commuter electric multiple unit (EMU) train type operated by the private railway operator Kintetsu Railway since 1986. In 1987, it was awarded the Laurel Prize, presented annually by the Japan Railfan Club.

== Operations ==
The 7000 series sets operate on Keihanna Line service, including through-running to and from the Osaka Metro Chūō Line.

== Formations ==
| Designation | Tc | M | T | M | M | Tc |
| Numbering | Ku 7100 | Mo 7200 | Sa 7300 | Mo 7400 | Mo 7500 | Ku 7600 |

== Interior ==
Passenger accommodation consists of longitudinal bench seating throughout.
