= Kintetsu 6820 series =

Japanese train type

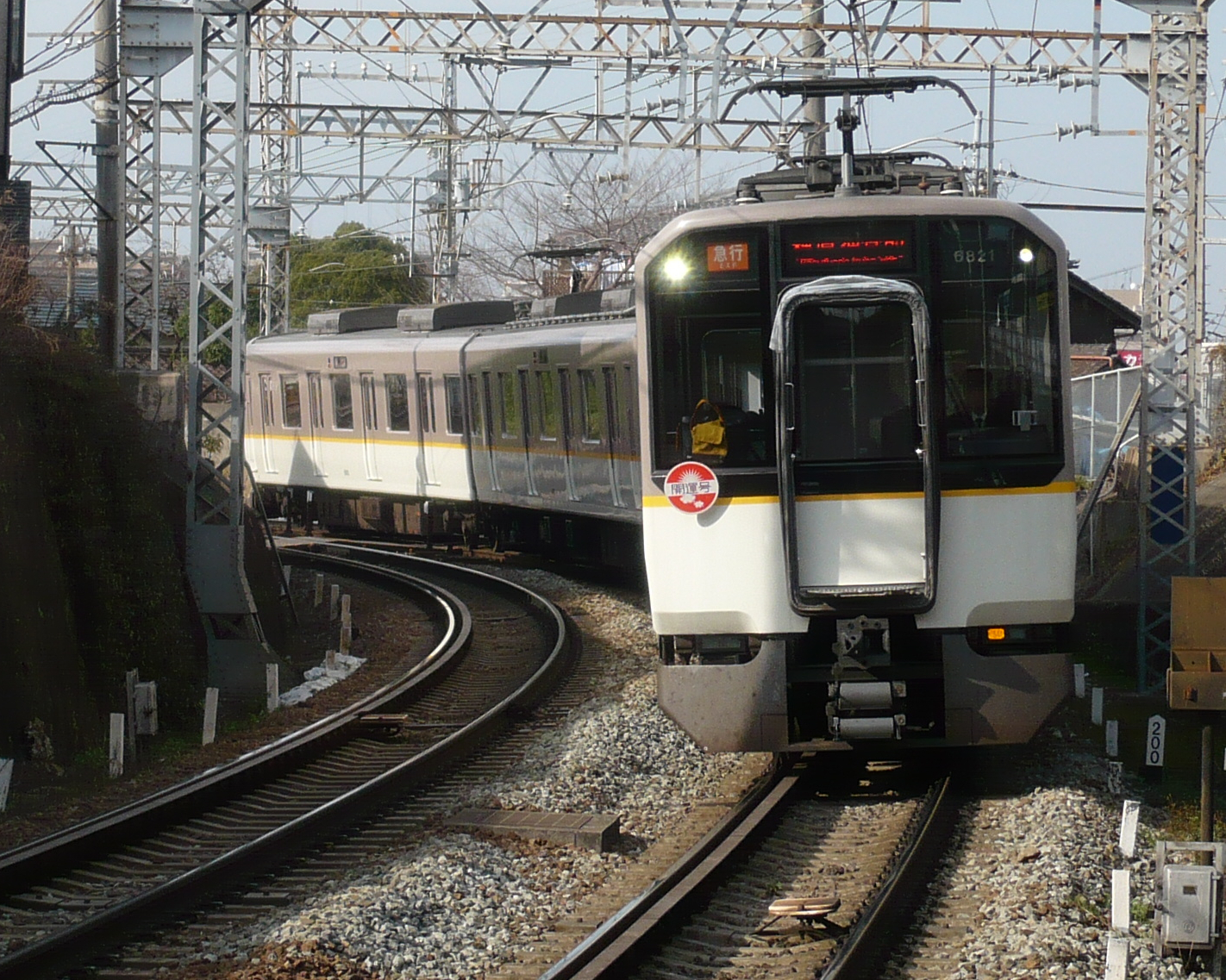
- A 6820 series on an Express service in January 2010
- Manufacturer: Kinki Sharyo
- Family name: Series 21
- Entered service: 2002
- Number built: 4 vehicles (2 sets)
- Number in service: 4 vehicles (2 sets)
- Formation: 2 cars per trainset
- Fleet numbers: AY21 – AY22
- Operator: Kintetsu Railway
- Depot: Furuichi
- Lines served: F Minami Osaka Line; F Yoshino Line; P Gose Line; O Nagano Line

Specifications
- Car body construction: Aluminium
- Car length: 20,720 mm (68 ft 0 in)
- Height: 4,150 mm (13 ft 7 in)
- Doors: 4 pairs per side
- Maximum speed: 100 km/h (62 mph)
- Traction system: Variable frequency (IGBT)
- Power output: 160 kW per motor
- Acceleration: 2.5 km/(h⋅s) (1.6 mph/s); 3.0 km/(h⋅s) (1.9 mph/s)
- Deceleration: 4.0 km/(h⋅s) (2.5 mph/s)
- Electric system: 1,500 V DC
- Current collection: Overhead line
- Bogies: KD-313
- Braking system: Electronically controlled pneumatic brakes
- Safety system: Kintetsu ATS (old/new)
- Track gauge: 1,067 mm (3 ft 6 in)

The Kintetsu 6820 series (近鉄6820系) is a commuter electric multiple unit (EMU) train type operated by the private railway operator Kintetsu since 2002.

== Operations ==
The 6820 series sets operate on Minami Osaka Line services.

== Formations ==
As of 1 April 2016, the fleet consists of two two-car sets, formed as follows, with one motored (Mc) car and one non-powered trailer (Tc) car, and the "Mc" car at the Yoshino end.

Designation	Tc	Mc
Numbering	Ku 6921	Mo 6821

The "Mc" car is fitted with two single-arm pantographs.

== Interior ==
Passenger accommodation consists of longitudinal bench seating throughout.

== See also ==
- Kintetsu 9020 series, similar 1,435 mm (4 ft 8 1/2 in) gauge trainset.
