= Kintetsu 9020 series =

Japanese train type

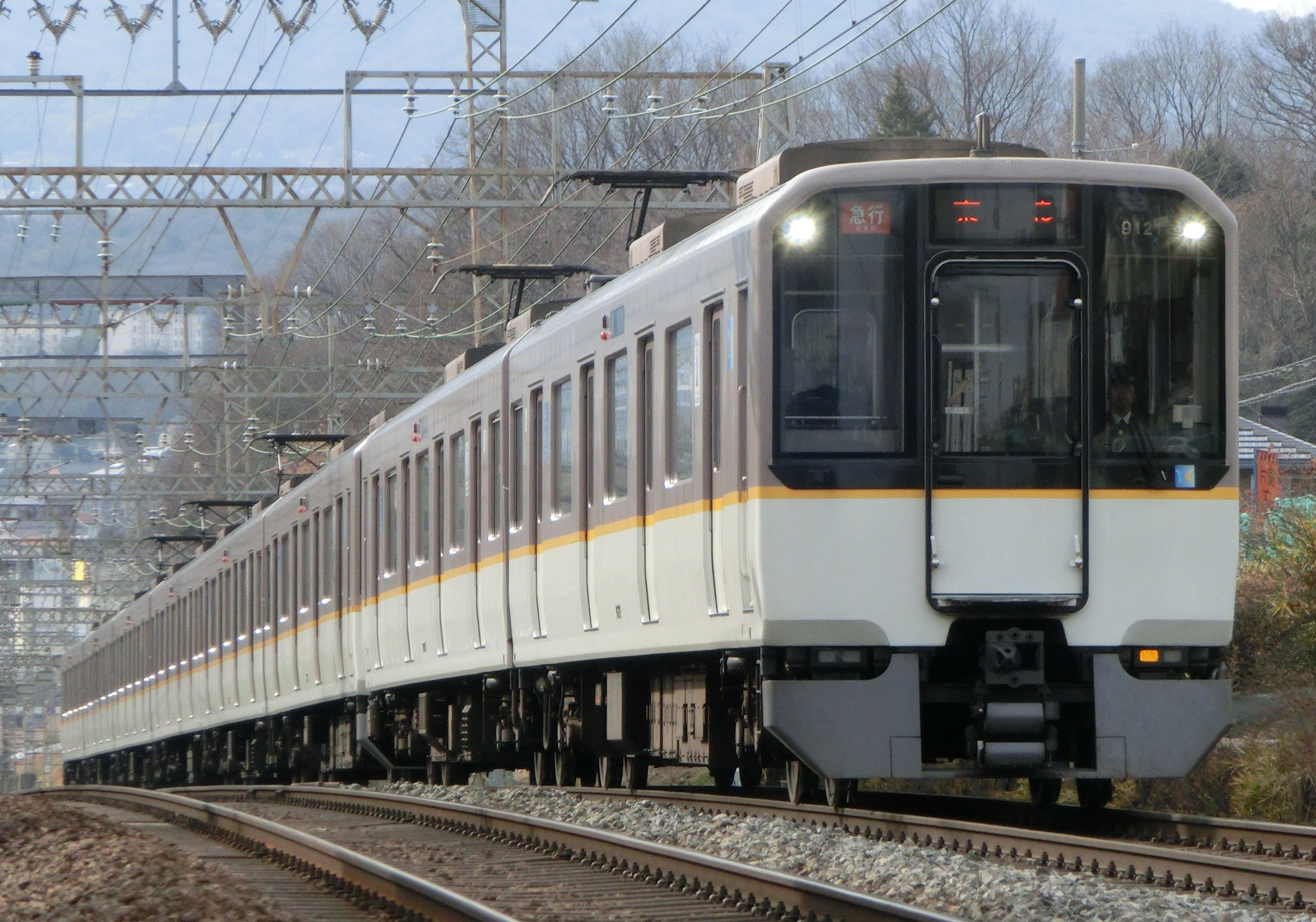
- A 9020 series on the Nara Line in January 2014
- Manufacturer: Kinki Sharyo
- Family name: Series 21
- Constructed: 2000–2008
- Entered service: 2000
- Number built: 40 vehicles (20 sets)
- Number in service: 40 vehicles (20 sets)
- Formation: 2 cars per trainset
- Fleet numbers: EE21 – EE39, EW51
- Operators: Kintetsu Railway
- Depots: Higashihanazono, Takayasu
- Lines served: A Nara Line; A Namba Line; B Kyoto Line; B Kashihara Line; H Tenri Line; D Osaka Line; M Yamada Line; M Toba Line; Hanshin Main Line; Hanshin Namba Line

Specifications
- Car body construction: Aluminium
- Car length: 20,720 mm (68 ft 0 in)
- Height: 4,150 mm (13 ft 7 in)
- Doors: 4 pairs per side
- Maximum speed: 110 km/h (68 mph)
- Traction system: Variable frequency (IGBT)
- Power output: 185 kW per motor
- Acceleration: 2.5 / 3.0 km/(h⋅s) (1.6 / 1.9 mph/s)
- Deceleration: 4.0 km/(h⋅s) (2.5 mph/s)
- Electric system(s): 1,500 V DC
- Current collector(s): Overhead line
- Bogies: KD-311
- Braking system(s): Electronically controlled pneumatic brakes
- Safety system(s): Kintetsu ATS (old/new); Hanshin ATS (except 9050 series)
- Track gauge: 1,435 mm (4 ft 8 1/2 in)

The Kintetsu 9020 series (近鉄9020系) is an electric multiple unit (EMU) commuter train type operated by the private railway operator Kintetsu Railway since 2000. In 2001, it was awarded the Laurel Prize, presented annually by the Japan Railfan Club.

== Operations ==
The 9020 series sets operate on Nara Line services, including through-running to and from Hanshin Electric Railway lines. One 9050 series variant operates on Osaka Line services.

== Formations ==
As of 1 April 2012, the fleet consists of 20 two-car sets, with 19 based at Higashihanazono Depot for Nara Line services, and one set based at Takayasu Depot for use on Osaka Line services.

=== Higashihanazono Depot sets ===
The two-car Nara Line sets are formed as follows, with one motored (M) car and one non-powered trailer (T) car, and the "Mc" car at the Namba/Kyoto end.

Designation	Mc	Tc
Numbering	Mo 9020	Ku 9120

The "Mc" car is fitted with two cross-arm or single-arm pantographs.

=== Takayasu Depot set ===
The sole two-car Osaka Line set, 9051, is formed as follows, with one motored (M) car and one non-powered trailer (T) car, and the "Tc" car at the Osaka Uehommachi end.

Designation	Tc	Mc
Numbering	Ku 9151	Mo 9051

The "Mc" car is fitted with two single-arm pantographs.

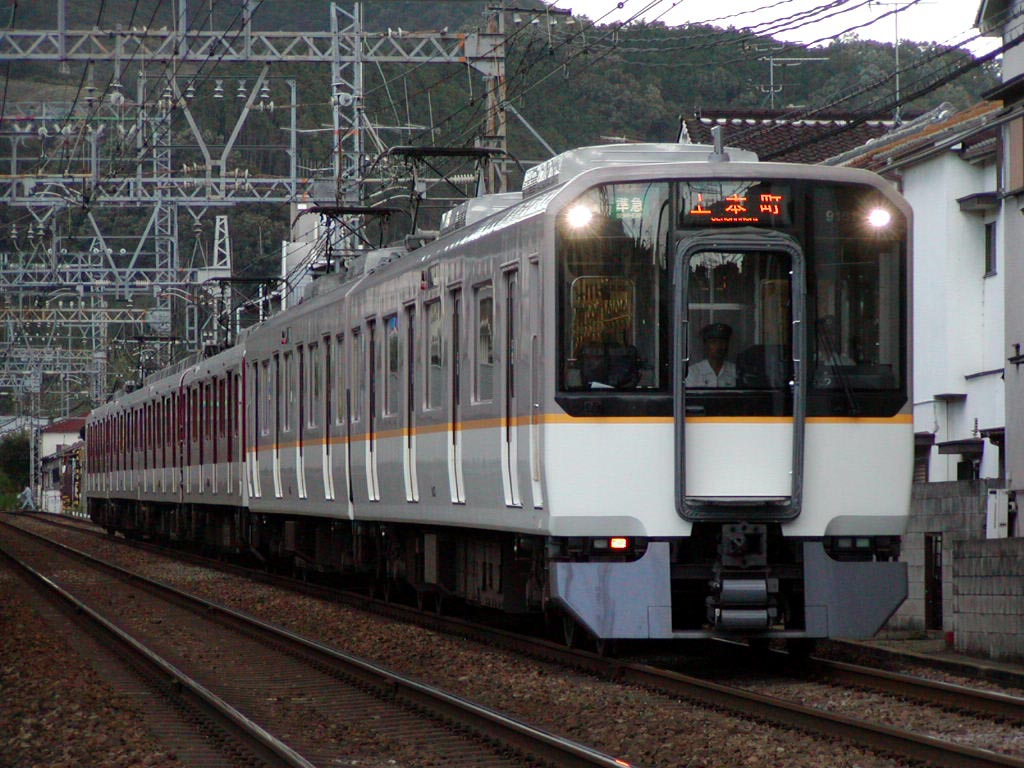
Set 9051 in October 2003

== Interior ==
Passenger accommodation consists of longitudinal bench seating throughout.

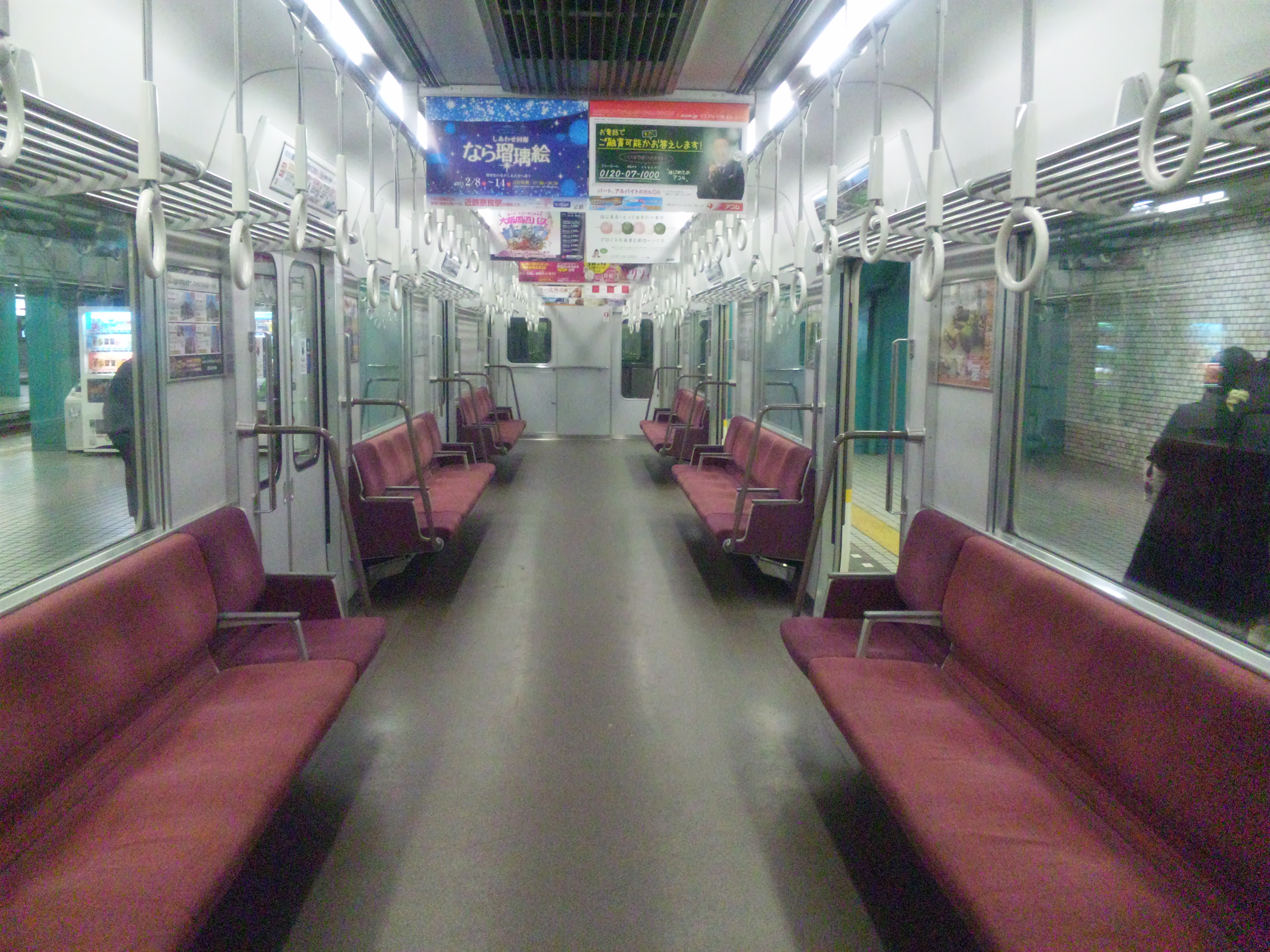
Interior view

== See also ==
- Kintetsu 9820 series, six-car sets based on the 9020 series design
- Kintetsu 6820 series, a narrow-gauge derivative of the 9020 series
