= Kintetsu 9820 series =

Japanese train type

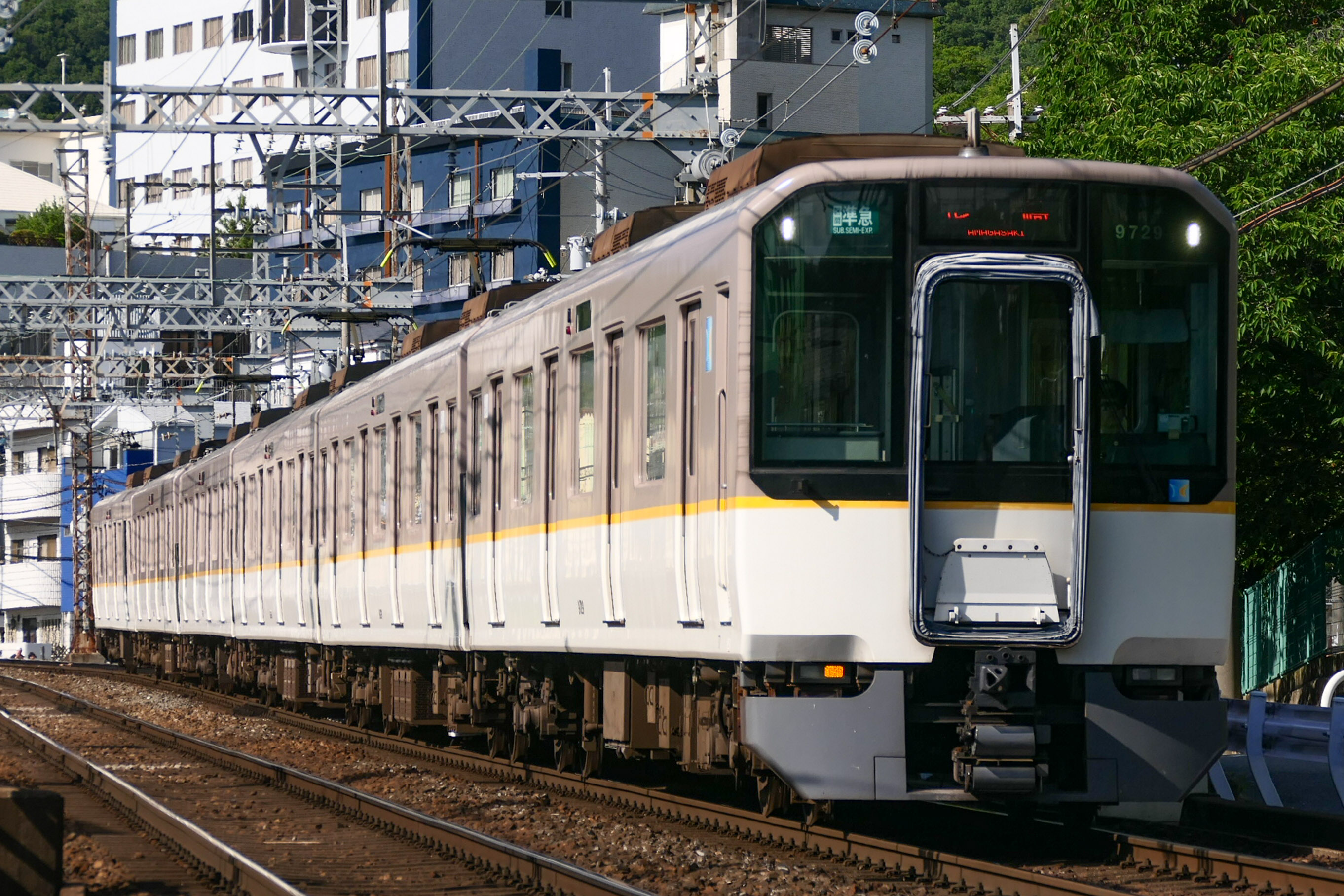
- 9820 series set 9829 in May 2026
- Manufacturer: Kinki Sharyo
- Family name: Series 21
- Constructed: 2001–2008
- Entered service: 2001
- Number built: 60 vehicles (10 sets)
- Number in service: 60 vehicles (10 sets)
- Formation: 6 cars per trainset
- Fleet numbers: EH21–EH30
- Operator: Kintetsu Railway
- Depot: Saidaiji
- Lines served: A Nara Line; A Namba Line; B Kyoto Line; B Kashihara Line; H Tenri Line; Hanshin Main Line; Hanshin Namba Line

Specifications
- Car body construction: Aluminium
- Car length: 20,720 mm (68 ft 0 in)
- Height: 4,150 mm (13 ft 7 in)
- Doors: 4 pairs per side
- Maximum speed: 110 km/h (68 mph)
- Traction system: Variable frequency (IGBT)
- Power output: 185 kW per motor
- Acceleration: 2.5 / 3.0 km/(h⋅s) (1.6 / 1.9 mph/s)
- Deceleration: 4.0 km/(h⋅s) (2.5 mph/s)
- Electric system: 1,500 V DC
- Current collection: Overhead line
- Bogies: KD-311
- Braking system: Electronically controlled pneumatic brakes
- Safety systems: Kintetsu ATS (old/new); Hanshin ATS
- Track gauge: 1,435 mm (4 ft 8 1/2 in)

The Kintetsu 9820 series (近鉄9820系) is a commuter electric multiple unit (EMU) train type operated by the private railway operator Kintetsu since 2001.

== Operations ==
The 9820 series sets operate on Kintetsu Nara Line services, including through-running to and from Hanshin Electric Railway lines, in formations of up to ten cars in multiple with other EMUs.

== Formations ==
As of 1 April 2016, the fleet consists of ten six-car sets, based at Saidaiji Depot, formed as follows, with three motored (M) cars and three non-powered trailer (T) cars, and the 9720 car at the Namba/Kyoto end.

Designation	Tc	M	M	T	M	Tc
Numbering	Ku 9720	Mo 9820	Mo 9620	Sa 9520	Mo 9420	Ku 9320

The motored cars are each fitted with one cross-arm or single-arm pantograph.

== Interior ==
Passenger accommodation consists of longitudinal bench seating throughout.

== See also ==
- Kintetsu 9020 series, similar two-car sets
