= Fugu (disambiguation) =

Fugu is a pufferfish and the dish prepared from it.

Fugu may also refer to:

- Fugu County, Shaanxi, China
  - Fugu Airport
- Fugu (software), an SFTP client
- Fugu Plan, a Japanese plan to re-settle European Jews in Asia
- Ghanaian smock or fugu, a plaid shirt
- Mehdi Zannad, a.k.a. Fugu, released an album with A Girl Called Eddy
- Fugu Furukawa, a Henchmen in Evil Genius 2 game.
- The Nexus Player, a digital media player developed by Google, codenamed fugu
- Fu Gu, Cao Wei official

== See also ==
- Fugou County
- Fogou, a type of cave-like structure found in Cornwall
- Fuku (disambiguation)
