= Fuga (disambiguation) =

Fuga is an island in the municipality of Aparri, Cagayan, Philippines.

Fuga may also refer to:

- Nissan Fuga, a full-size sedan
- Fuga (film), a 2006 Argentine-Chilean drama film
- Fuga: Melodies of Steel, a 2021 video game

== People with the given name ==
- Fūga Yamashiro (山代 風我; born 1993), Japanese anime director
- Fuga Sato (佐藤 風雅; born 1996), Japanese sprinter

== People with the surname ==
- Lodovico Fuga (1643–1722), Italian Baroque composer
- Ferdinando Fuga (1699–1782), Italian architect
- Myqerem Fuga (fl. 1970s), Albanian politician
- Tani Fuga (born 1973), Samoan rugby union player
- Endri Fuga (born 1981), Albanian government spokesman
- Paula Fuga (fl. 2000s), Hawaiian singer-songwriter

== See also ==
- Fugue (disambiguation)
- La Fuga (disambiguation)
- En Fuga, a 1994 Roy Brown studio album
