= Kuise Station =

Railway station in Amagasaki, Hyōgo Prefecture, Japan

Kuise Station 杭瀬駅
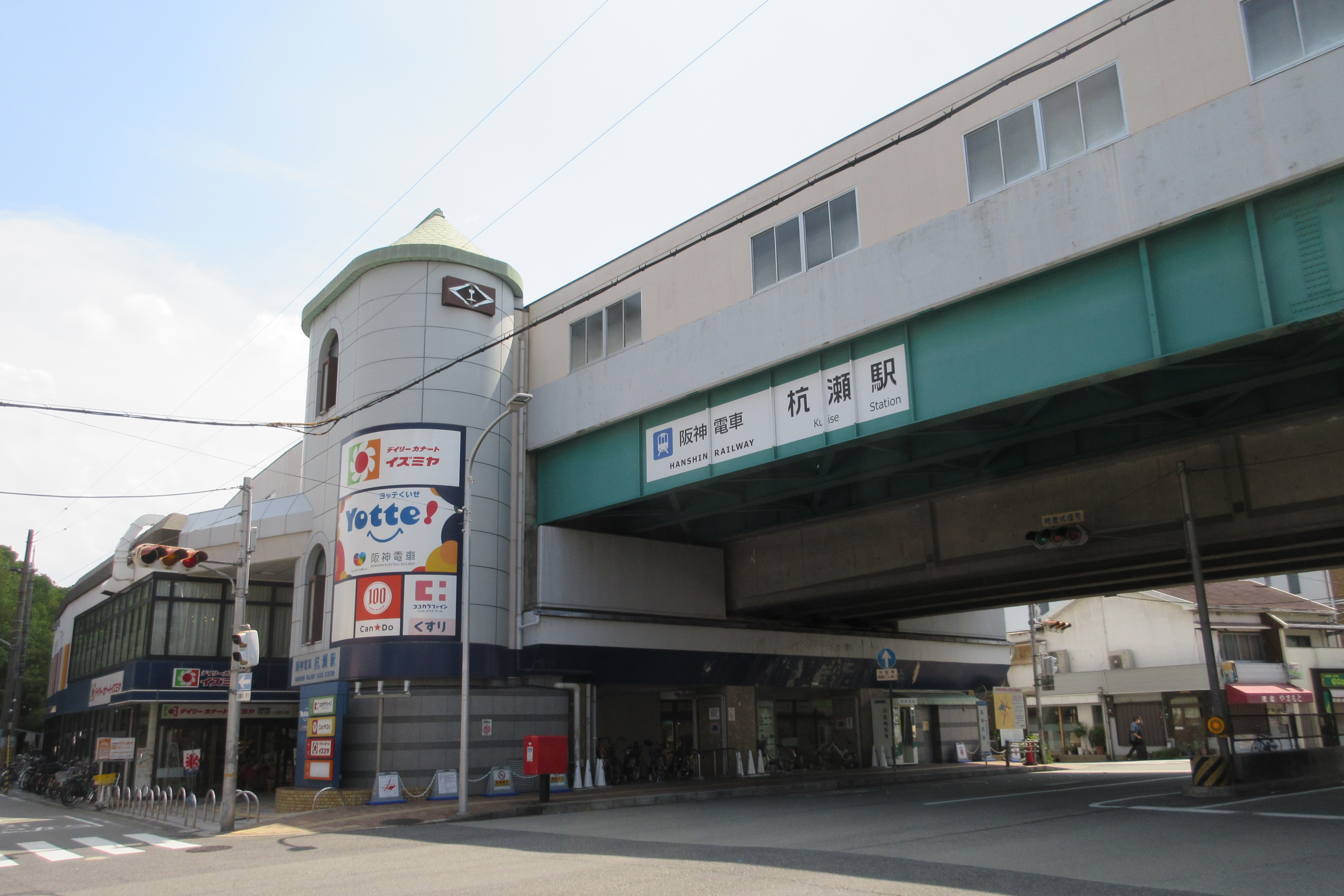
- Kuise Station

General information
- Location: 1, Kuise-hommachi, Amagasaki-shi, Hyōgo-ken; Japan
- Coordinates: 34°43′06″N 135°26′20″E
- Operator: Hanshin Electric Railway
- Line: ■ Hanshin Main Line
- Distance: 6.8 km (4.2 miles) from Umeda
- Platforms: 2 side platforms
- Connections: Bus terminal

Other information
- Status: Staffed
- Station code: HS-07
- Website: Official website

History
- Opened: April 12, 1905

Passengers
- FY2019: 9,189
Location
- Location within Hyōgo Prefecture Location within Japan

Kuise Station (杭瀬駅, Kuise-eki; station number: HS-07) is a passenger railway station located in the city of Amagasaki Hyōgo Prefecture, Japan. It is operated by the private transportation company Hanshin Electric Railway.

== Lines ==
Kuise Station is served by the Hanshin Main Line, and is located 6.8 kilometers from the terminus of the line at Umeda.

== Layout ==
The station consists of two opposed elevated side platforms serving two tracks. The ticket gate and concourse are on the 2nd floor, and the platforms are on the 3rd floor.

=== Platforms ===
1	■ Main Line	for Noda and Osaka (Umeda)
2	■ Hanshin Main Line	for Amagasaki, Koshien, Kobe (Sannomiya), Akashi, and Himeji

== Adjacent stations ==
«	Service	»
Hanshin Electric Railway
Main Line
Chibune	Local	Daimotsu
Morning Express: Does not stop at this station
Express: Does not stop at this station
Morning Limited Express for Umeda: Does not stop at this station
Limited Express; Through Limited Express: Does not stop at this station

== History ==
Kuise Station was opened on April 12, 1905 with the opening of the Hanshin Main Line

== Passenger statistics ==
In fiscal 2019, the station was used by an average of 9,189 passengers daily

== Surrounding area ==
- "Eki no Machi Kuise" shopping center
- Kuise Kumano Shrine
- Japan National Route 2

== See also ==
- List of railway stations in Japan
