= Chidoribashi Station =

Railway station in Osaka, Japan

Chidoribashi Station 千鳥橋駅
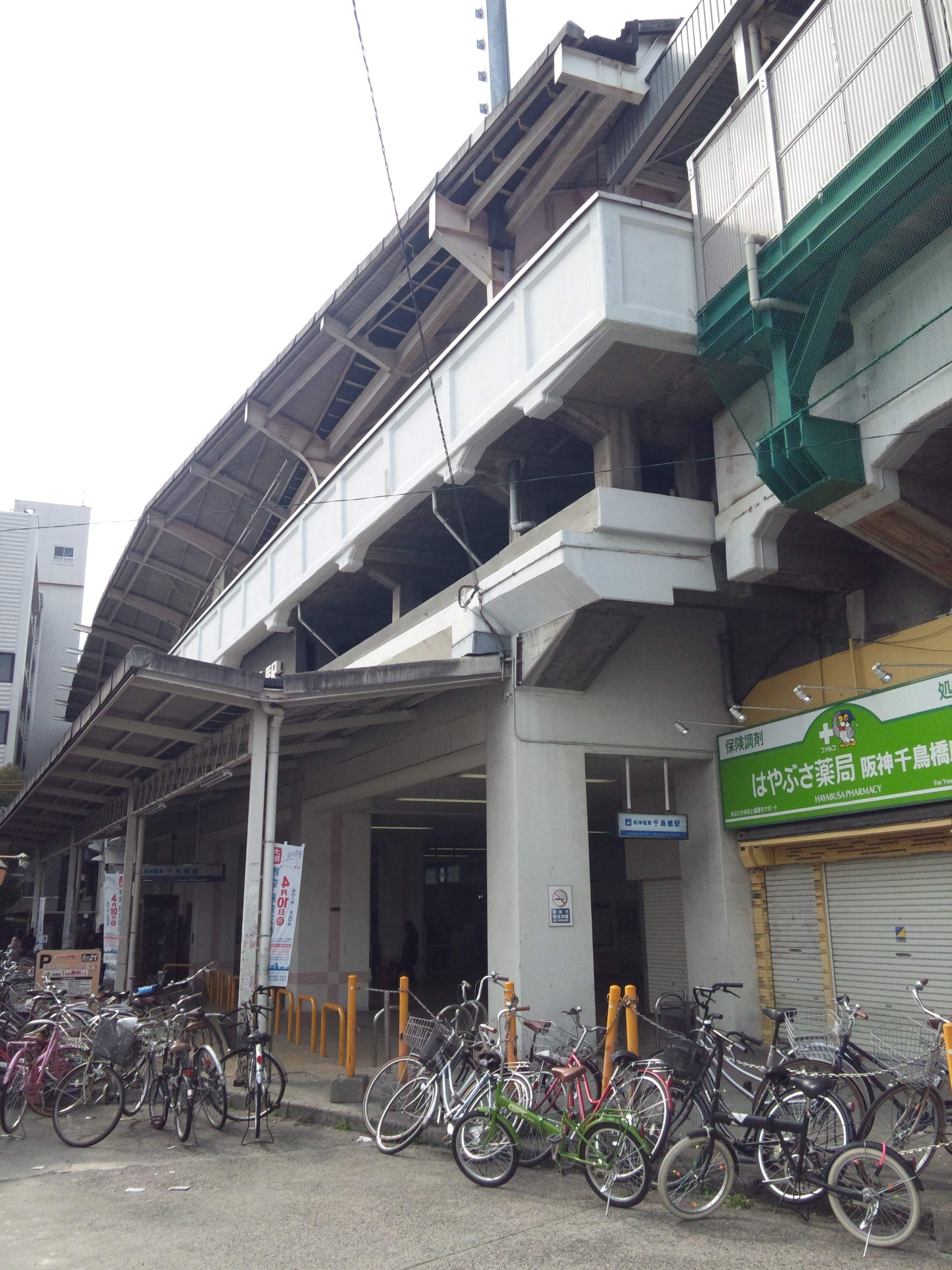
- Chidoribashi Station

General information
- Location: 1-43 Shinkanjima, Konohana -ku, Osaka City; Japan
- Coordinates: 34°41′7.81″N 135°27′28.2″E
- Operator: Hanshin Electric Railway
- Line: ■ Hanshin Namba Line
- Distance: 5.5 km (3.4 miles) from Amagasaki
- Platforms: 2 side platforms

Construction
- Structure type: Elevated
- Accessible: Yes

Other information
- Station code: HS 46
- Website: Official website

History
- Opened: 1 August 1924

Services
Preceding station	Hanshin	Following station
Nishikujō towards Ōsaka Namba	Hanshin Namba Line Local Semi-Express Suburban Semi-Express	Dempō towards Amagasaki
Location
- Location within Osaka Prefecture Location within Japan

Chidoribashi Station (千鳥橋駅, Chidoribashi-eki) is a railway station in Konohana-ku, Osaka, Osaka Prefecture, Japan. It is operated by the private transportation company Hanshin Electric Railway.

== Lines ==
- Hanshin Electric Railway
  - Hanshin Namba Line

All rapid express trains pass Chidoribashi, Dempo, Fuku, Dekijima, and Daimotsu every day from March 20, 2012, and suburban semi-express trains run to Amagasaki instead.

== Layout ==
The station consists of two elevated opposed side platforms serving two tracks. There is only one ticket gate on the ground level.

=== Platforms ===
■ Hanshin Namba Line	for Nishikujo, Namba and Nara
■ Hanshin Namba Line	for Amagasaki, Koshien and Kobe (Sannomiya)

== History ==
Chidoribashi Station opened on 1 April, 1924 along with the rest of what was then the Hanshin Dempo Line.

An extension from this station to Nishikujō Station was opened in 1964.

Station numbering was introduced on 21 December 2013, with Chidoribashi being designated as station number HS-46.

== Passenger statistics ==
In fiscal 2022, the station was used by an average of 8,554 passengers daily.

== See also ==
- List of railway stations in Japan
