= Dempō Station =

Railway station in Osaka, Japan

Coordinates: 34.6893°N 135.4517°E

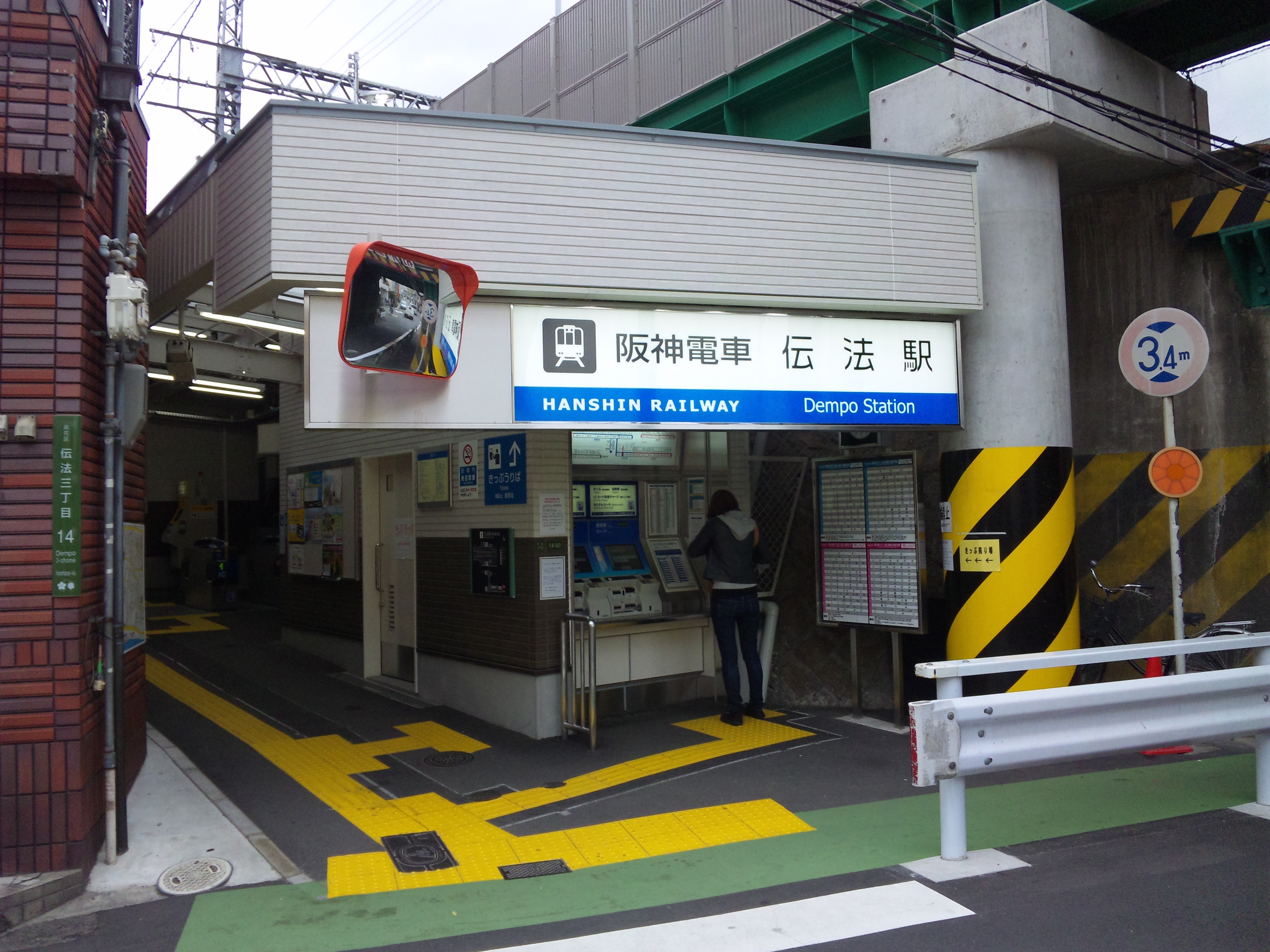
Dempō Station

Dempō Station (伝法駅, Denpō-eki) is a railway station in Konohana-ku, Osaka, Osaka Prefecture, Japan. There were station signs with the spelling "Denpō" from the opening until December 2008, then they were replaced the new ones with the spelling "Dempō" in February 2009.

== Lines ==
- Hanshin Electric Railway
  - Hanshin Namba Line

== Layout ==
| ■ Hanshin Namba Line | for Nishikujo, Namba and Nara |
| ■ Hanshin Namba Line | for Amagasaki, Koshien and Kobe (Sannomiya) |

== Adjacent stations ==
| « | Service | » |
Hanshin Railway
Hanshin Namba Line
| Fuku | Local | Chidoribashi |
| Fuku | Semi-Express; Suburban Semi-Express | Chidoribashi |
Rapid Express: Does not stop at this station

All rapid express trains pass Chidoribashi, Dempo, Fuku, Dekijima, and Daimotsu every day from March 20, 2012, and suburban semi-express trains run to Amagasaki instead.
