= Fuku =

Fuku may refer to:

== People with the name ==
- Hiroto Fuku (福 敬登, born 1992), Japanese baseball player
- Mitsutarō Fuku (福 光太郎, 1898–1965), Japanese photographer
- Tei Fuku (1330–?), Chinese politician
- Fuku Suzuki (鈴木 福, born 2004), Japanese actor
- Fuku Akino (秋野 不矩, 1908–2001), Japanese painter
- Lady Kasuga (1579–1643), true name: Saitō Fuku (斉藤福) was a Japanese noble lady

== Fictional Characters ==
  - Fuku (Tenchi Muyo!), a character in Tenchi Muyo! GXP

== Places with the name ==
- Fuku Station, a train station in Nishiyodogawa-ku, Osaka, Japan
- Fuku, part of Momofuku (restaurants)

== Animals with the name ==
- Fugu or Fuku, pufferfish

== See also ==
- Seifuku or Japanese school uniform
