= Amagasaki Station =

Amagasaki Station (尼崎駅) may refer to:

- Amagasaki Station (JR West)
- Amagasaki Station (Hanshin)
