= Kujō =

Kujō (九条 or 九條) literally means ninth street in Japanese.

== Names ==
- Kujō family, a Japanese kuge family and one of the five regent houses (go-sekke)

== Fictional characters ==
- Karen Kujō (九条 カレン), character in the anime/manga series Kin-iro Mosaic
- Alisa Mikhailovna Kujō (アリサ・ミハイロヴナ・九条) and Maria Mikhailovna Kujō (マリヤ・ミハイロヴナ・九条), characters in the light novel series Alya Sometimes Hides Her Feelings in Russian
- Jōtarō Kūjō (空条 承太郎), character in the anime/manga series JoJo's Bizarre Adventure

== Places ==
- Streets in Japan
  - Kujō Street (九条通, Kujō-dori), one of numbered east–west streets in the ancient capital of Heian-kyō, present-day Kyoto
- Train stations in Japan:
  - Kujō Station (Kyoto), a train station on the Kyoto Municipal Subway Karasuma Line in Minami-ku, Kyoto
  - Kujō Station (Osaka), a train station on the Osaka Municipal Subway Chuo Line in Nishi-ku, Osaka
  - Kujō Station (Nara), a train station on the Kintetsu Kashihara Line in Yamatokōriyama, Nara

== See also ==
- Cujo (disambiguation)
