= Namba Line =

Namba Line may refer to either of the following railway lines in Osaka Prefecture, Japan:

- Kintetsu Namba Line, a railway line connecting Osaka Namba Station and Osaka Uehommachi Station
- Hanshin Namba Line, a railway line connecting Osaka Namba Station and Amagasaki Station
