= Mitsutarō =

- Gender: Male

Origin
- Origin: Japanese
- Meaning: Different meanings depending on the kanji used

Mitsutarō, Mitsutaro or Mitsutarou (written: 光太郎) is a masculine Japanese given name. Notable people with the name include:

- Mitsutarō Fuku (福 光太郎; 1898–1965), Japanese photographer
- Mitsutaro Shirai (白井 光太郎; 1863–1932), Japanese plant pathologist, mycologist and herbalist
