= Kujō Station (Osaka) =

Railway and metro station in Osaka, Japan

Kujō Station 九条駅

General information
- Location: Kujo Itchome, Nishi, Osaka, Osaka （大阪市西区九条一丁目） Japan
- Operator: Osaka Metro; Hanshin Electric Railway Co. Ltd.

Other information
- Station code: C 14
Location

Kujō Station (九条駅, Kujō-eki) is a railway station on the Osaka Metro Chūō Line (station number: C14) and the Hanshin Railway Hanshin Namba Line (station number: HS 44) in Kujo Itchome, Nishi-ku, Osaka, Japan.

== Layout ==
=== Osaka Metro Chūō Line ===
Kujō Station 九条駅
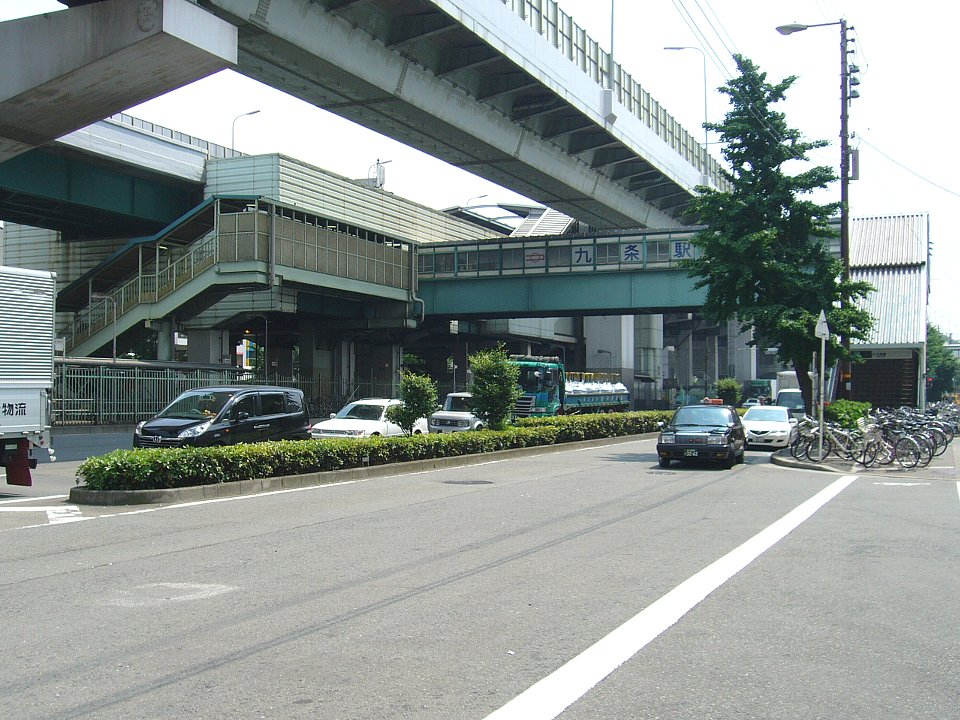
- entrance of Osaka Municipal Subway (June 6, 2006)

General information
- Location: Kujo Itchome, Nishi, Osaka, Osaka （大阪市西区九条一丁目） Japan
- Coordinates: 34°40′31.99″N 135°28′25.58″E
- System: Osaka Metro
- Operator: Osaka Metro
- Line: Chūō Line

Other information
- Station code: C 14

History
- Opened: 1964

Services
Preceding station	Osaka Metro	Following station
Bentenchō C 13 towards Yumeshima	Chūō Line	Awaza C 15 towards Nagata
Location

This elevated station is located above Chuo Odori Street and below the Hanshin Expressway Route 16 Osaka Port Line. 2 side platforms serving a track each are located on the third floor. Ticket gates are located in the east and the west on the second floor. The west gates became in use on March 20, 2009, the day of the opening of the Hanhsin Namba Line. The gates were in use from the opening in 1964, but closed after the opening of the east gates until 2009.

1	■ Chūō Line	for Hommachi, Tanimachi Yonchome, Morinomiya, Nagata, Ikoma and Gakken Nara-Tomigaoka
2	■ Chūō Line	for Bentencho, Osakako and Yumeshima

=== Hanshin Railway Hanshin Namba Line ===
Kujō Station 九条駅
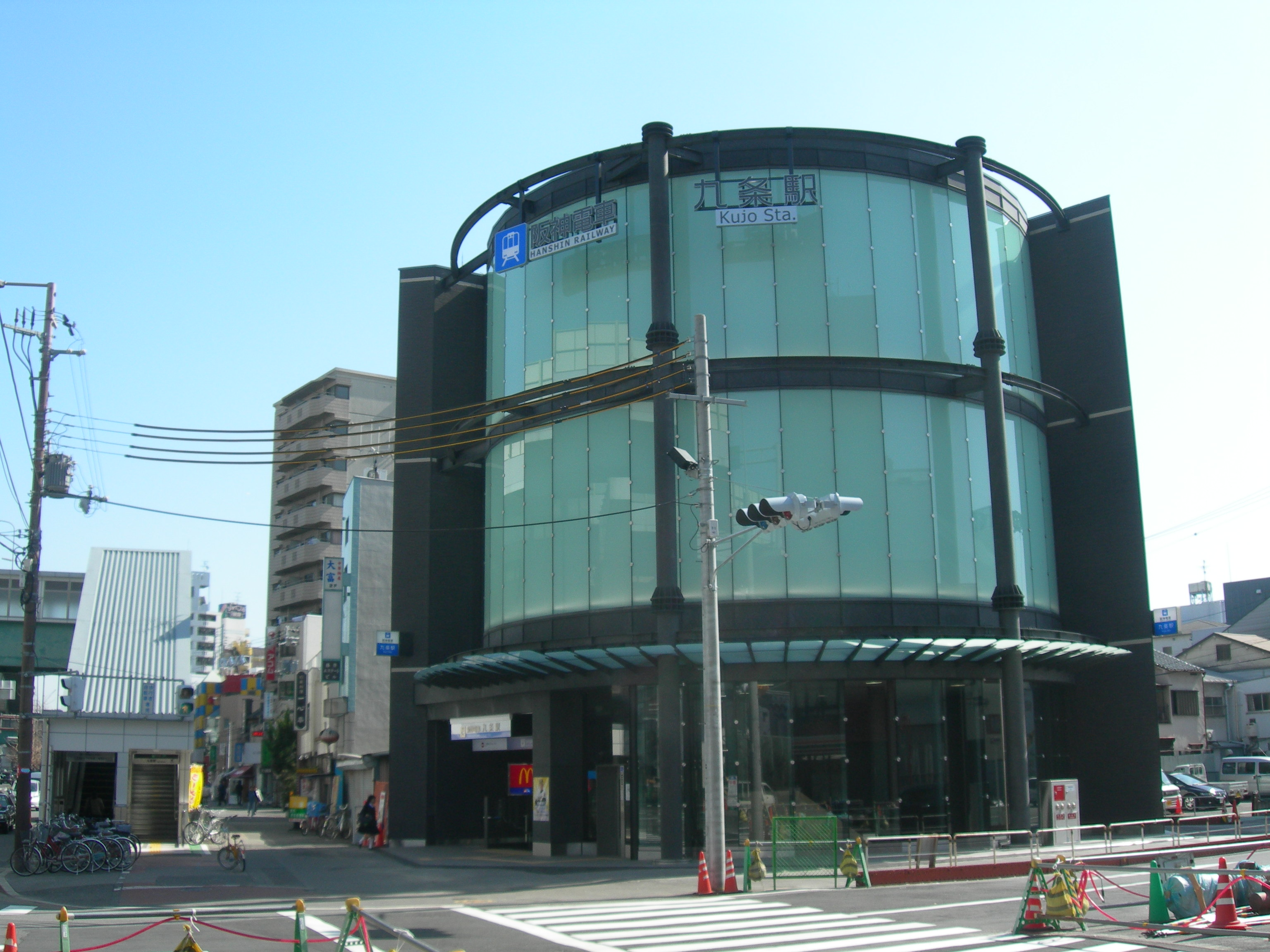
- Hanshin Railway Entrance 1 (March 21, 2009)

General information
- Location: Kujo Itchome, Nishi, Osaka, Osaka （大阪市西区九条一丁目） Japan
- Coordinates: 34°40′25.32″N 135°28′25.76″E
- System: Hanshin Railway
- Operator: Hanshin
- Line: Hanshin Namba Line

Other information
- Station code: HS 44

History
- Opened: 2009

Services
Preceding station	Hanshin	Following station
Dome-mae towards Ōsaka Namba	Hanshin Namba Line Local Suburban Semi-Express Semi-Express Rapid Express	Nishikujō towards Amagasaki
Location

An island platform serving 2 tracks is located on the 2nd level below the ground.

2 entrances are located. Entrance 1 is located along Chuo Odori Street and close to the west entrance of Kujo Station owned by Osaka Metro. Entrance 2 is located on the 1st floor of NTT West Building along Kujo Nakadori Route.

When Hanshin Railway was planning to extend a railway line to Namba in the 1960s, 2 entrances were situated for the line, 1 was in Nippon Telegraph and Telephone Public Corporation Building (present: NTT West Building) and the other was Sumikin Kosan Kujo Building (present: Nippon Steel & Sumikin Kosan Kujo Building). After 42 years, the former became in use for Hanshin Railway Kujo Station Entrance 2. The latter is no longer in use because it is connected to the paid area.

1	■ Hanshin Namba Line	for Ōsaka Namba and Nara
2	■ Hanshin Namba Line	for Amagasaki, Koshien and Kobe Sannomiya; Change trains at Amagasaki or Kobe Sannomiya for Akashi and Himeji

== Surroundings ==
- Chuō Ōdōri
- Hanshin Expressway Route 16 Osaka Port Line
- Osaka Dome
- Osaka Kujo Post Office
- Nine Mall Kujo (Buffa-Road; Buffaloes Road)
- Kirara Kujo Shopping Street
- Kujo Shin-ei-kai Shopping Street (Shin-chan Road)
- Kujo Sennichi Street
