= Cujo (disambiguation) =

Cujo is a 1981 novel by Stephen King.

Cujo may also refer to:

- Cujo (film), a 1983 film based on the novel
- CUJO, the Cambridge University Jazz Orchestra
- Willie Wolfe, nicknamed Cujo (1951–1974), member of the Symbionese Liberation Army
- Moondog Cujo (1960–2009), American professional wrestler
- Curtis Joseph, nicknamed "Cujo" (born 1967), Canadian hockey coach and former player
- Cujo, or Amon Tobin (born 1972), Brazilian musician

== See also ==
- Kujō (disambiguation)
