= Daimotsu Station =

Railway station in Amagasaki, Hyōgo Prefecture, Japan

Daimotsu Station 大物駅
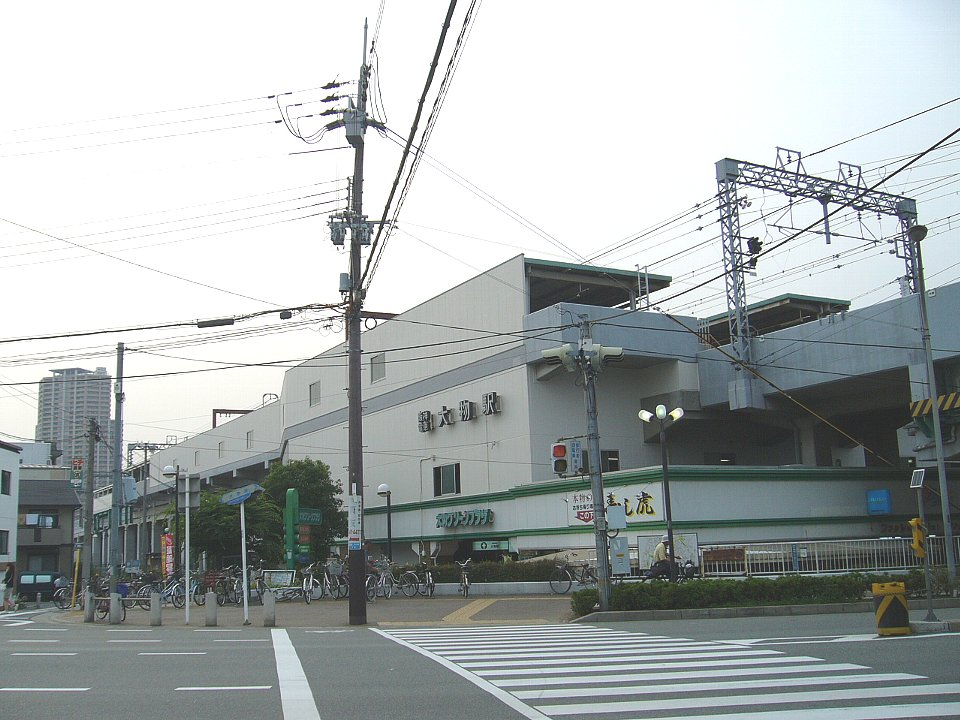
- Daimotsu Station

General information
- Location: 2, Daimotsu-chō, Amagasaki-shi, Hyōgo-ken 660-0823; Japan
- Coordinates: 34°42′59.25″N 135°25′33.68″E
- Operator: Hanshin Electric Railway
- Line: ■ Hanshin Main Line ■ Hanshin Namba Line
- Distance: 8.0 km (5.0 miles) from Umeda
- Platforms: 1 island + 2 side platforms
- Connections: Bus stop

Other information
- Status: Staffed
- Station code: HS-8
- Website: Official website

History
- Opened: April 12, 1905

Passengers
- FY2019: 8,571
Location
- Location within Hyōgo Prefecture Location within Japan

Daimotsu Station (大物駅, Daimotsu-eki; station number: HS-08) is a junction passenger railway station located in the city of Amagasaki Hyōgo Prefecture, Japan. It is operated by the private transportation company Hanshin Electric Railway.

== Lines ==
Daimotsu Station is served by the Hanshin Main Line and is located 8.0 kilometers from the terminus of the line at Umeda. It is also served by the Hanshin Namba Line and is 0.9 kilometers from the terminus of that line at Amagasaki

== Layout ==
The station consists of an elevated island platform sandwiched between two side platforms. Platform 1 has an effective length of 100 meters, and currently a 4-car train of Hanshin trains stops here. Tracks 2 to 4 are 130 meters long and can accommodate 6-car trains of both Hanshin's 19 m class trains and Kinki Nippon Railway's 21 m class trains. The ticket gates and concourse are on the 2nd floor, and the platforms are on the 3rd floor. There is only one ticket gate. The main line platform is slightly curved.

=== Platforms ===
1	■ Hanshin Main Line	for Noda and Umeda
2	■ Hanshin Main Line	from Umeda for Amagasaki, Koshien, Kobe (Sannomiya, Kosoku Kobe), Akashi and Himeji
3	■ Hanshin Namba Line	for Nishikujo, Dome-mae, Namba and Nara
4	■ Hanshin Namba Line	from Namba for Amagasaki, Koshien, and Kobe (Sannomiya)

== Adjacent stations ==
«	Service	»
Hanshin Main Line
Kuise	Local	Amagasaki
Morning Express: Does not stop at this station
Express: Does not stop at this station
Morning Limited Express for Umeda: Does not stop at this station
Limited Express: Does not stop at this station
Through Limited Express: Does not stop at this station
Hanshin Namba Line
Amagasaki	Local	Dekijima
Amagasaki	Semi-Express; Suburban Semi-Express	Dekijima
Rapid Express: Does not stop at this station

All rapid express trains pass Chidoribashi, Dempo, Fuku, Dekijima, and Daimotsu every day from March 20, 2012, and suburban semi-express trains run to Amagasaki instead.

== History ==
Daimotsu Station was opened on April 12, 1905, with the opening of the Hanshin Main Line

== Passenger statistics ==
In fiscal 2019, the station was used by an average of 8,571 passengers daily

== Surrounding area ==
- Japan National Route 2
- Daimotsu Park with a preserved JNR Class D51 steam locomotive
- Amagasaki Daimotsu Hospital

== See also ==
- List of railway stations in Japan
