= Fuku Station =

Railway station in Osaka, Japan

Coordinates: 34.6997°N 135.4429°E

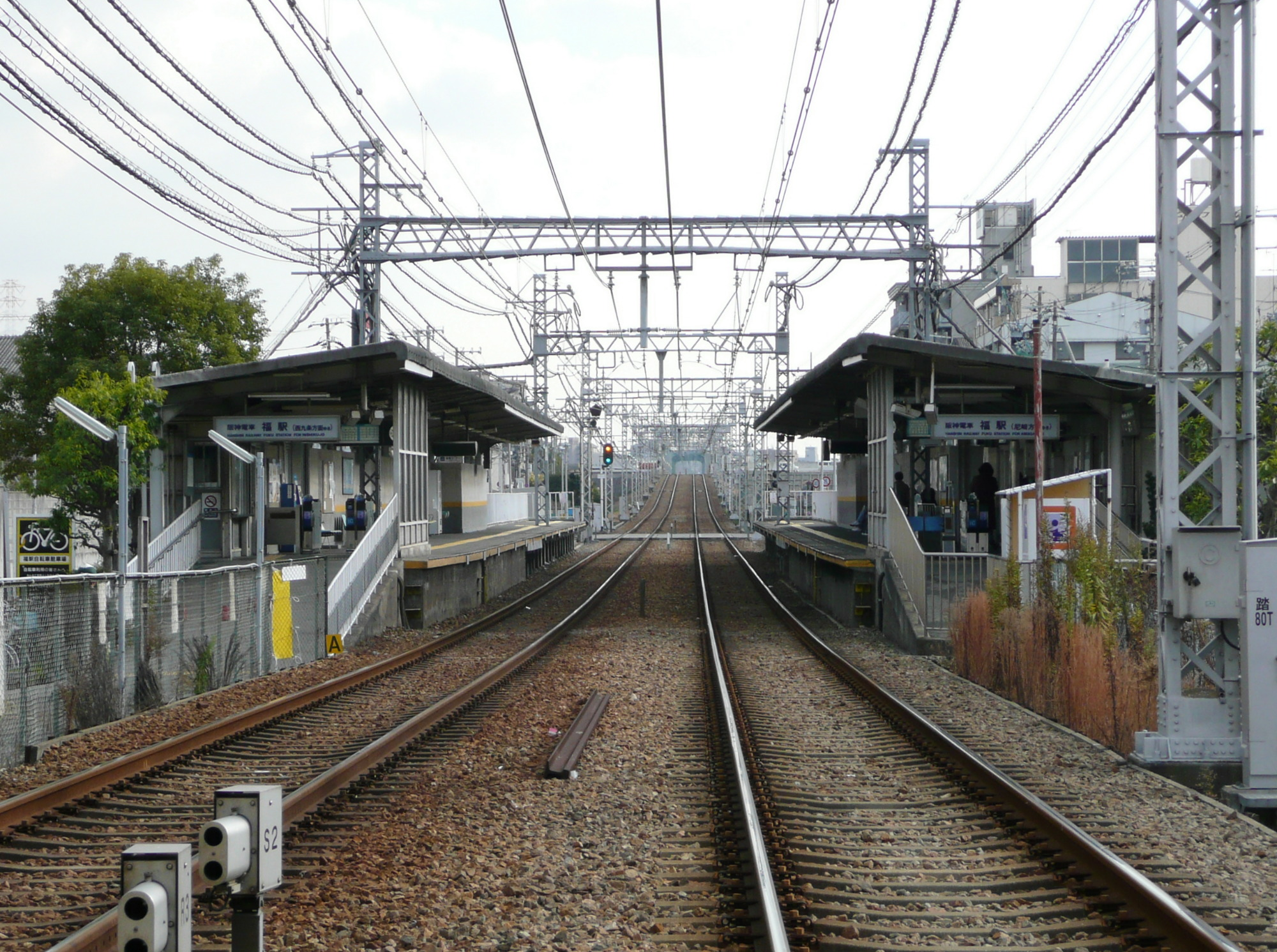
Fuku Station

Fuku Station (福駅, Fuku-eki) is a railway station in Nishiyodogawa-ku, Osaka, Osaka Prefecture, Japan.

== Lines ==
- Hanshin Electric Railway
  - Hanshin Namba Line

== Layout ==
■ Hanshin Namba Line	for Nishikujo, Namba and Nara
■ Hanshin Namba Line	for Amagasaki, Koshien and Kobe (Sannomiya)

== Adjacent stations ==
«	Service	»
Hanshin Railway
Hanshin Namba Line
Dekijima	Local	Dempō
Dekijima	Semi-Express; Suburban Semi-Express	Dempō
Rapid Express: Does not stop at this station

All rapid express trains pass Chidoribashi, Dempo, Fuku, Dekijima, and Daimotsu every day from March 20, 2012, and suburban semi-express trains run to Amagasaki instead.
