= Fugue (disambiguation) =

A fugue is a type of musical composition.

Fugue may also refer to:

- Fugue (film), a 2018 Polish film
- Fugue (hash function), a cryptographic hash function
- Fugue (magazine), an American literary journal
- Fugues (magazine), a Canadian gay-interest magazine
- The Fugue (foaled 2009), a British Thoroughbred racehorse
- Fugue state, a psychological term
- Fugue State Press, a small New York City literary publisher
- Fuging tune, a variety of Anglo-American vernacular choral music
- "Fugue", an instrumental by The Dillinger Escape Plan from Dissociation
- "Fugue", a song by Emerson, Lake & Palmer from Trilogy
- Füge, the Hungarian name for Figa village, Beclean town, Bistriţa-Năsăud County, Romania
- Fuge or Feudge, a surname found in England
- Dr. Frederique Fugue, a fictional character from the children's animated series Arthur
- Fugue, a version of the character Tingyun in the video game Honkai: Star Rail

== See also ==
- Category:Fugues
- Fugu (disambiguation)
