= La Fuga =

La Fuga or La fuga may refer to:

- La fuga (1937 film), a 1937 Argentine film
- La fuga (1944 film), a 1944 Mexican film
- La fuga (1965 film), a 1965 Italian film
- La Fuga (2001 film), a 2001 Argentine film
- La Fuga (band), a Spanish rock band

== See also ==
- Fuga (disambiguation)
