= Hanshin Namba Line =

Railway line in Osaka, Japan

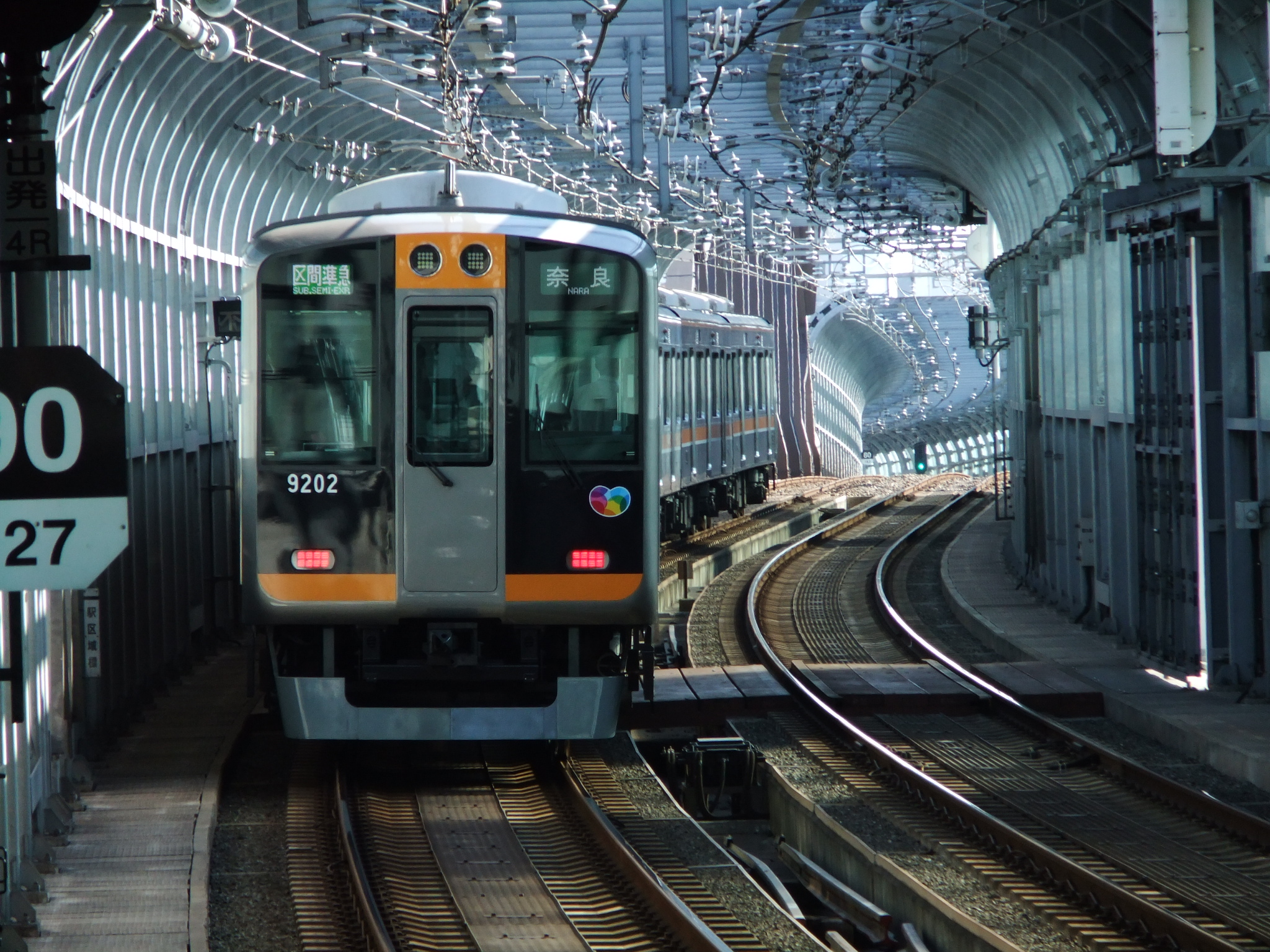
- Hanshin 9000 series EMU

Overview
- Native name: 阪神なんば線
- Owner: Hanshin Electric Railway Co., Ltd. Nishi-Osaka Railway Co., Ltd.
- Locale: Osaka and Hyogo prefectures, Japan
- Termini: Amagasaki; Ōsaka Namba
- Stations: 11

Service
- Type: Commuter rail
- Operator(s): Hanshin Electric Railway Co., Ltd.
- Depot: Amagasaki
- Rolling stock: various EMUs (see below)

History
- Opened: January 20, 1924; 102 years ago

Technical
- Line length: 10.1 km (6.3 mi)
- Number of tracks: 2
- Track gauge: 1,435 mm (4 ft 8 1/2 in)
- Electrification: 1,500 V DC, overhead line

The Hanshin Namba Line (阪神なんば線, Hanshin Nanba sen) is a railway line operated by the private railway operator Hanshin Electric Railway connecting Amagasaki Station in Amagasaki, Hyogo Prefecture, and Ōsaka Namba Station in Chuo-ku, Osaka, Osaka Prefecture, Japan.

== History ==
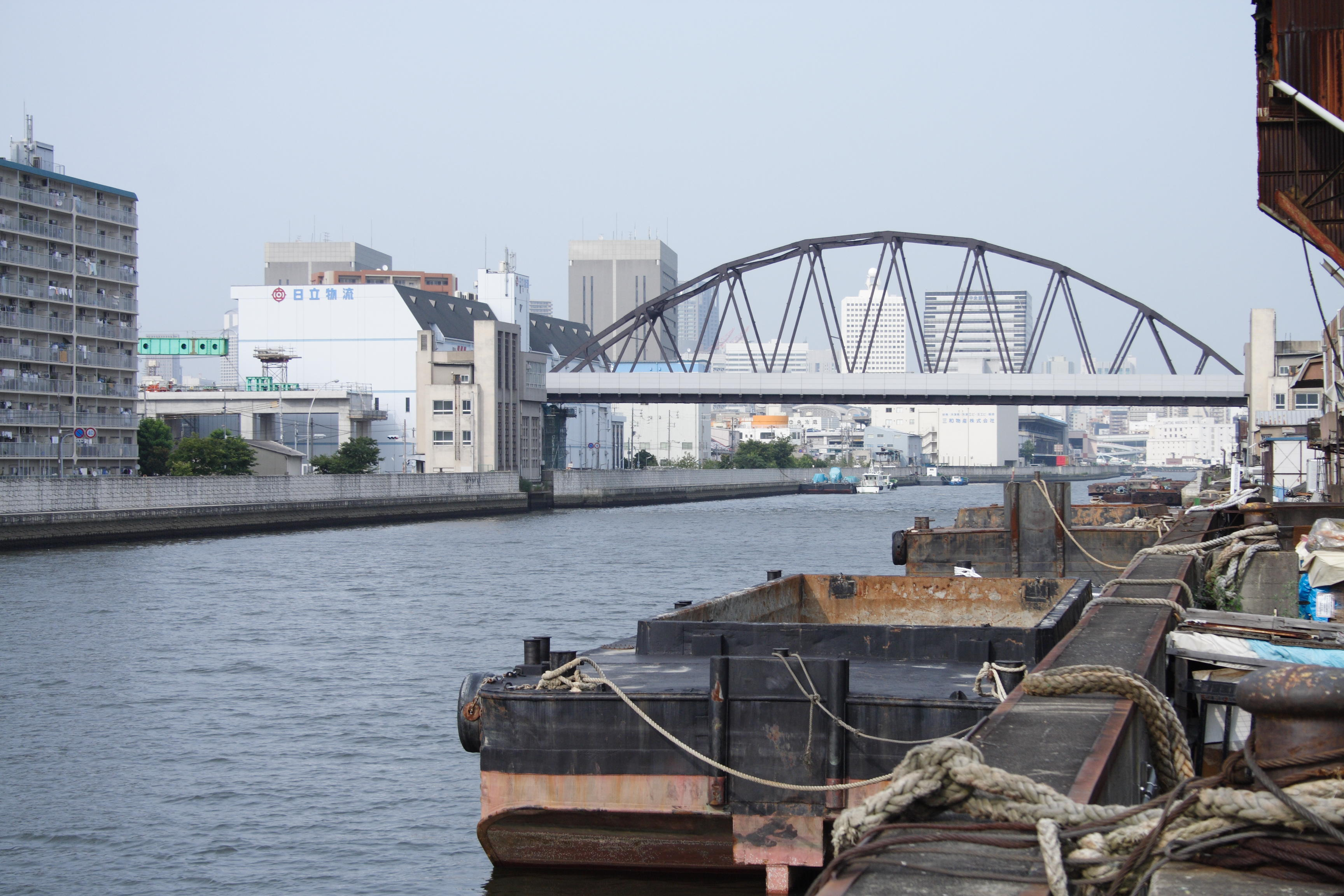
Ajigawa Bridge under construction (August 2007)

The Dempō Line (伝法線), the predecessor of the Hanshin Namba Line, was planned as a bypass for the Hanshin Railway Main Line, and to connect from Amagasaki to Noda via Dempō. Then the plan was changed to connect to Nishikujō. The line was finally extended to Namba station in 2009.

- January 20, 1924 - The Dempō Line was opened (Daimotsu - Dempō).
- August 1, 1924 - The line was extended from Dempō to Chidoribashi.
- December 28, 1928 - The line was extended from Daimotsu to Amagasaki.
- June 1960 - The first stage of construction to extend line to Namba was started (Chidoribashi - Nishikujō).
- May 20, 1964 - The first stage of construction to extend the line to Namba was completed, thus, the line was extended from Chidoribashi to Nishikujō. The Dempo Line was renamed the Nishi-Osaka Line (西大阪線).
- September 1965 - Nishi-Osaka limited express service started.
- December 1, 1974 - Nishi-Osaka limited express service was abandoned.
- July 10, 2001 - Nishi-Osaka Railway Co., Ltd. was established to restart the extension from Nishikujō to Namba.
- October 7, 2003 - The construction of the extending line from Nishikujō to Namba was restarted.
- March 20, 2009 - The line from Nishikujō to Namba opened, and the line was renamed the Hanshin Namba Line.

== Operations ==
There are through rapid express operations between Kobe Sannomiya on the Main Line in Kobe and Kintetsu Nara Station on the Kintetsu Nara Line in Nara via the Hanshin Namba Line, and through local, semi-express, and suburban semi-express operations between Amagasaki Station and Kintetsu Nara Station.

- Rapid Express
  - Three to five trains per hour on weekdays, and three trains per hour at weekends and holidays
  - Trains stop at Kobe Sannomiya, Uozaki, Ashiya, Nishinomiya, Koshien, Amagasaki, Nishikujo, Kujo, Dome-mae, Sakuragawa, Ōsaka Namba, Kintetsu Nippombashi, Osaka Uehommachi, Tsuruhashi, Ikoma, Gakuen-mae, Yamato-Saidaiji, Shin-Omiya and Kintetsu Nara. Rapid express services also stop at Imazu and Mukogawa during the weekday offpeak, and on weekends and holidays, but pass Ashiya on weekends and holidays.
  - The first 3 trains are operated from Shinkaichi Station on the Kobe Kosoku Line for Nara at weekends and holidays.
  - 6, 8 or 10 cars (Weekdays: 6 cars between Kobe Sannomiya and Amagasaki / weekends and holidays: many trains have 8 cars between Kobe Sannomiya and Kintetsu Nara)
- Local, semi-express, suburban semi-express
  - 6 trains per hour every day
  - Local trains stop at every station on the Hanshin Namba Line, the Kintetsu Namba Line, and the Kintetsu Nara Line.
  - Semi-express trains stop at every station between Amagasaki and Tsuruhashi, Fuse, Kawachi-Kosaka, Higashi-Hanazono, and every station between Ishikiri and Kintetsu Nara. Suburban semi-express trains also stop at Hyotan-yama, Hiraoka and Nukata.
  - 6 cars

== Stations ==
- ● : trains stop
- | : trains pass
- Local / Suburban semi-express / Semi-express trains stop at every station on this line

No.	Station	Japanese	Distance (km)		Train type	Connecting lines	Location	
No.	Station	Japanese	between stations	from Amagasaki	Rapid express	Connecting lines	Location	
Rapid express trains operate to Kobe Sannomiya Station on the Main Line.
HS 09	Amagasaki	尼崎	-	0.0	●	Hanshin Main Line	Amagasaki, Hyōgo	
HS 08	Daimotsu	大物	0.9	0.9	|	Hanshin Main Line	Amagasaki, Hyōgo	
HS 49	Dekijima	出来島	1.4	2.3	|		Nishiyodogawa-ku, Osaka	Osaka Prefecture
HS 48	Fuku	福	1.0	3.3	|		Nishiyodogawa-ku, Osaka	Osaka Prefecture
HS 47	Dempō	伝法	1.5	4.8	|		Konohana-ku, Osaka	Osaka Prefecture
HS 46	Chidoribashi	千鳥橋	0.7	5.5	|		Konohana-ku, Osaka	Osaka Prefecture
HS 45	Nishikujō	西九条	0.8	6.3	●	Osaka Loop Line (JR-O14), Sakurajima Line (JR Yumesaki Line) (JR-P14)	Konohana-ku, Osaka	Osaka Prefecture
HS 44	Kujō	九条	1.3	7.6	●	Chūō Line (C14)	Nishi-ku, Osaka	Osaka Prefecture
HS 43	Dome-mae	ドーム前	0.6	8.2	●	Nagahori Tsurumi-ryokuchi Line (N12:Dome-mae Chiyozaki Station)	Nishi-ku, Osaka	Osaka Prefecture
HS 42	Sakuragawa	桜川	0.8	9.0	●	Sennichimae Line (S15); Nankai Kōya Line (Shiomibashi Line) (NK06-5: Shiomibashi Station)	Naniwa-ku, Osaka	Osaka Prefecture
HS 41	Ōsaka Namba	大阪難波	1.1	10.1	●	Namba Line (A01, with through trains); Nankai Main Line, Kōya Line (NK01: Namba Station); Osaka Metro (Namba Station): Midōsuji Line (M20), Yotsubashi Line (Y15), Sennichimae Line (S16); Kansai Main Line (Yamatoji Line) (JR-Q17: JR Namba Station)	Chūō-ku, Osaka	Osaka Prefecture
Trains operate to Kintetsu Nara Station on the Nara Line.

== Rolling stock ==
- Hanshin 1000 series EMU
- Hanshin 9000 series EMU
- Kintetsu 1026 series EMU
- Kintetsu 1252 series EMU
- Kintetsu 5800 series EMU
- Kintetsu 5820 series EMU
- Kintetsu 9020 series EMU
- Kintetsu 9820 series EMU
- Kintetsu 22600 series EMU (chartered trains)
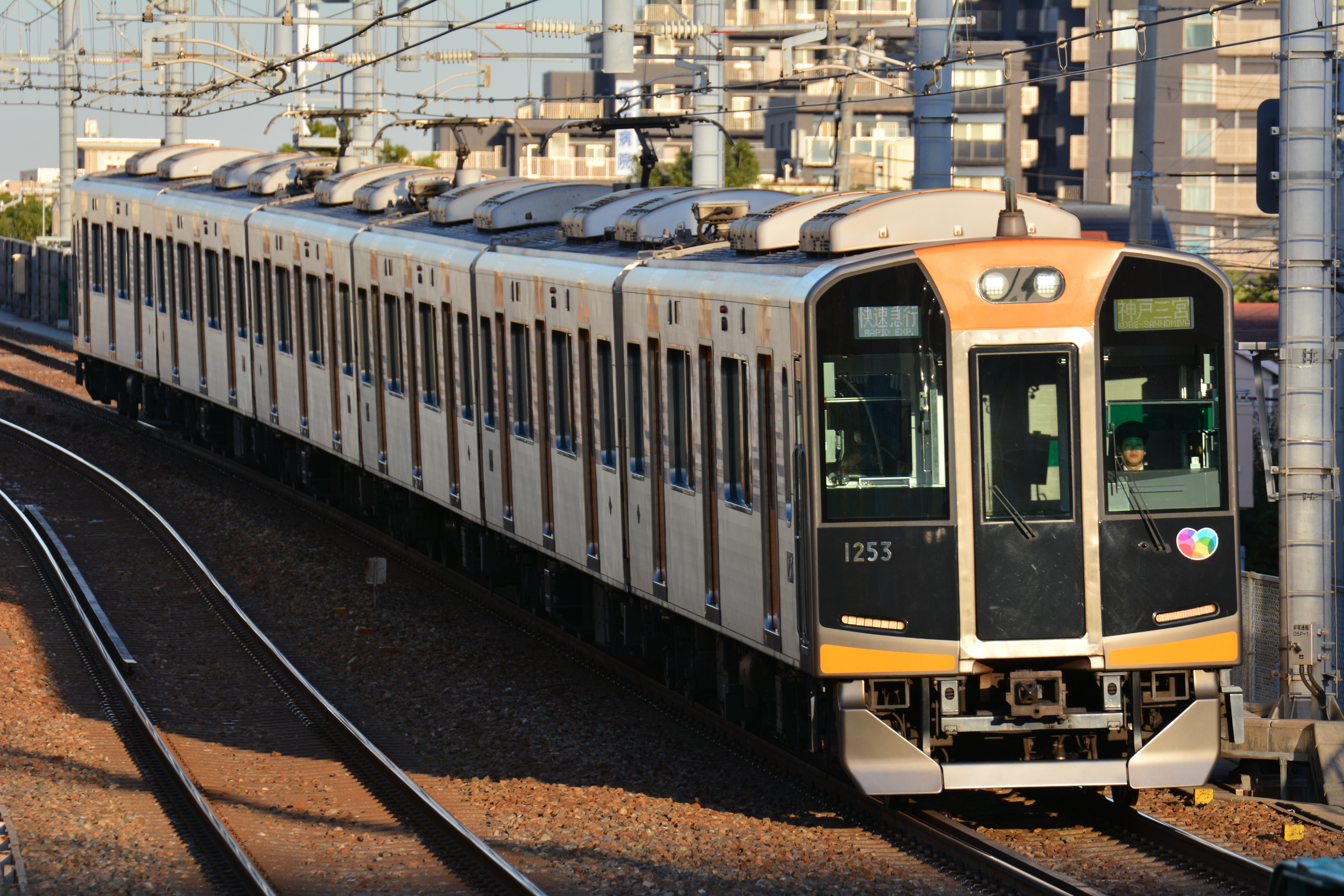
Hanshin 1000 series

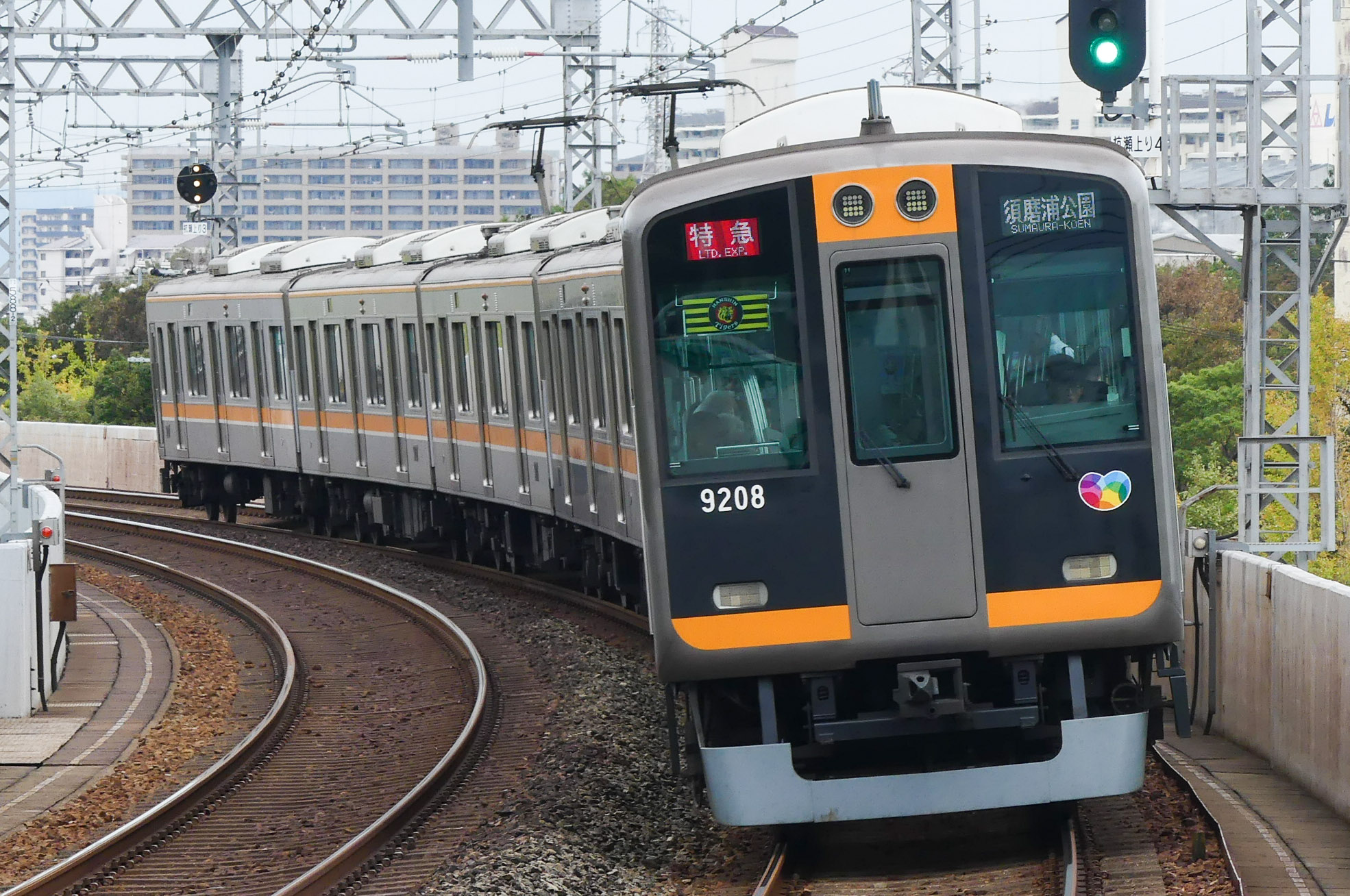
Hanshin 9000 series

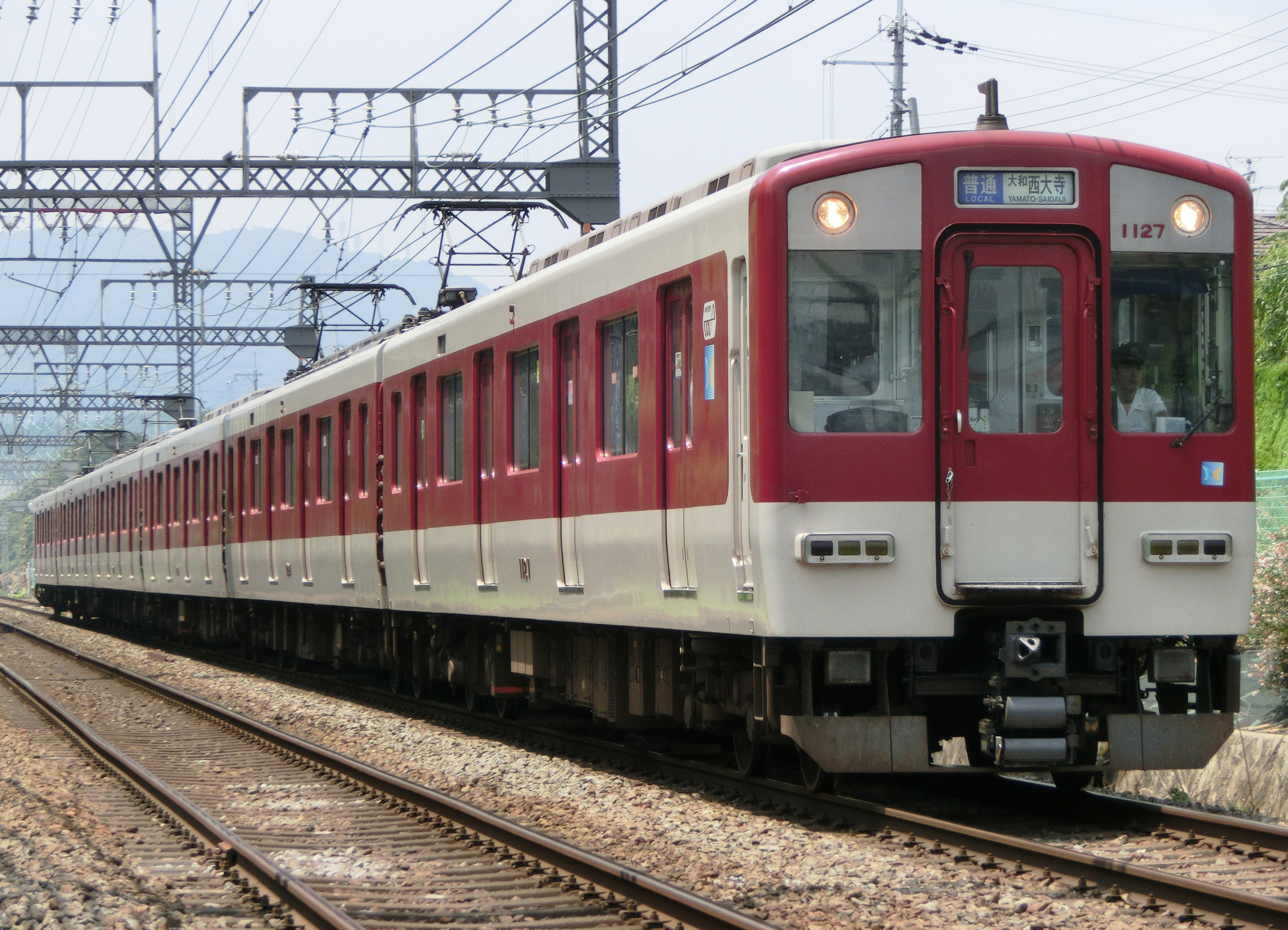
Kintetsu 1026 series

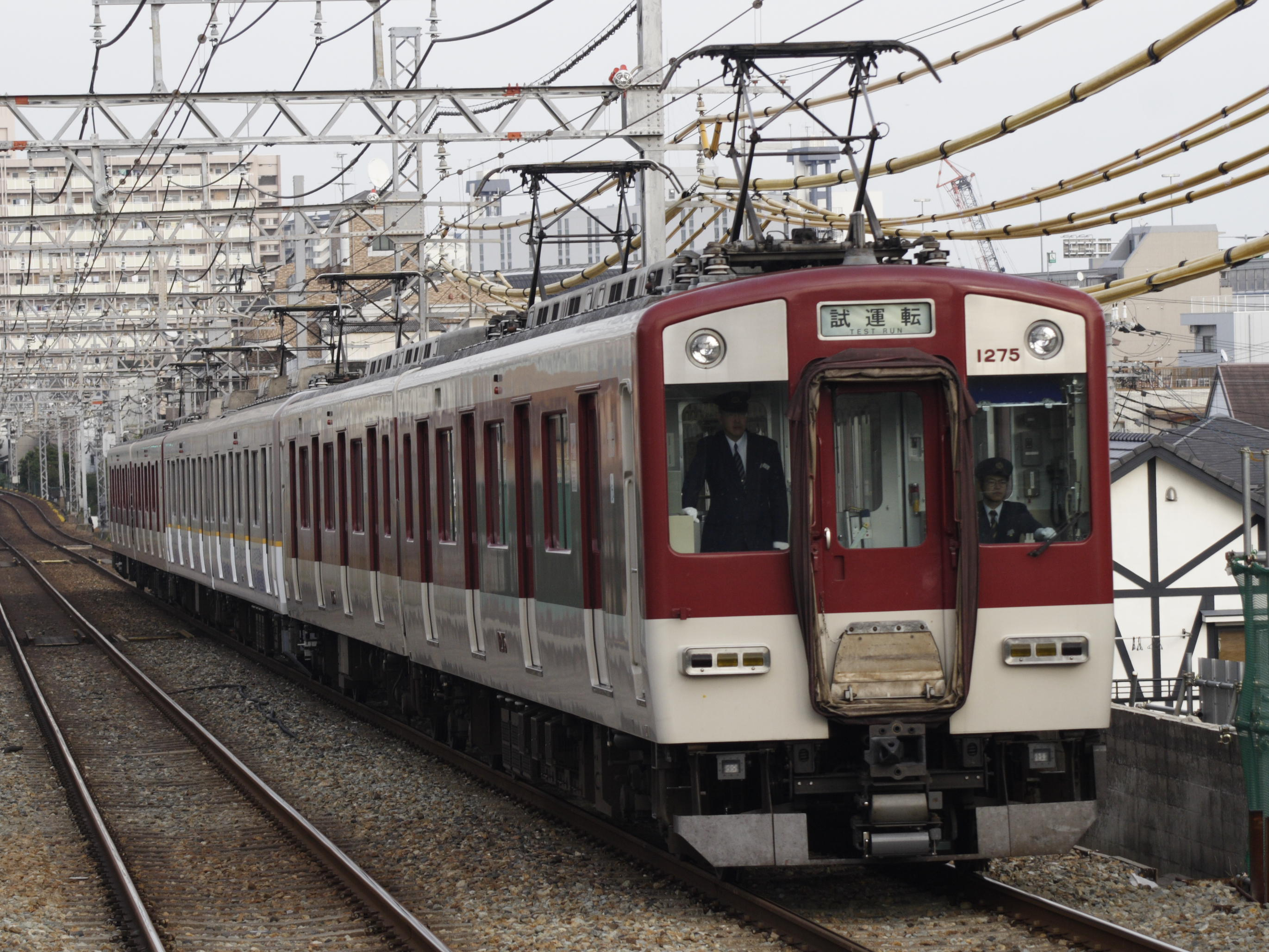
Kintetsu 1252 series

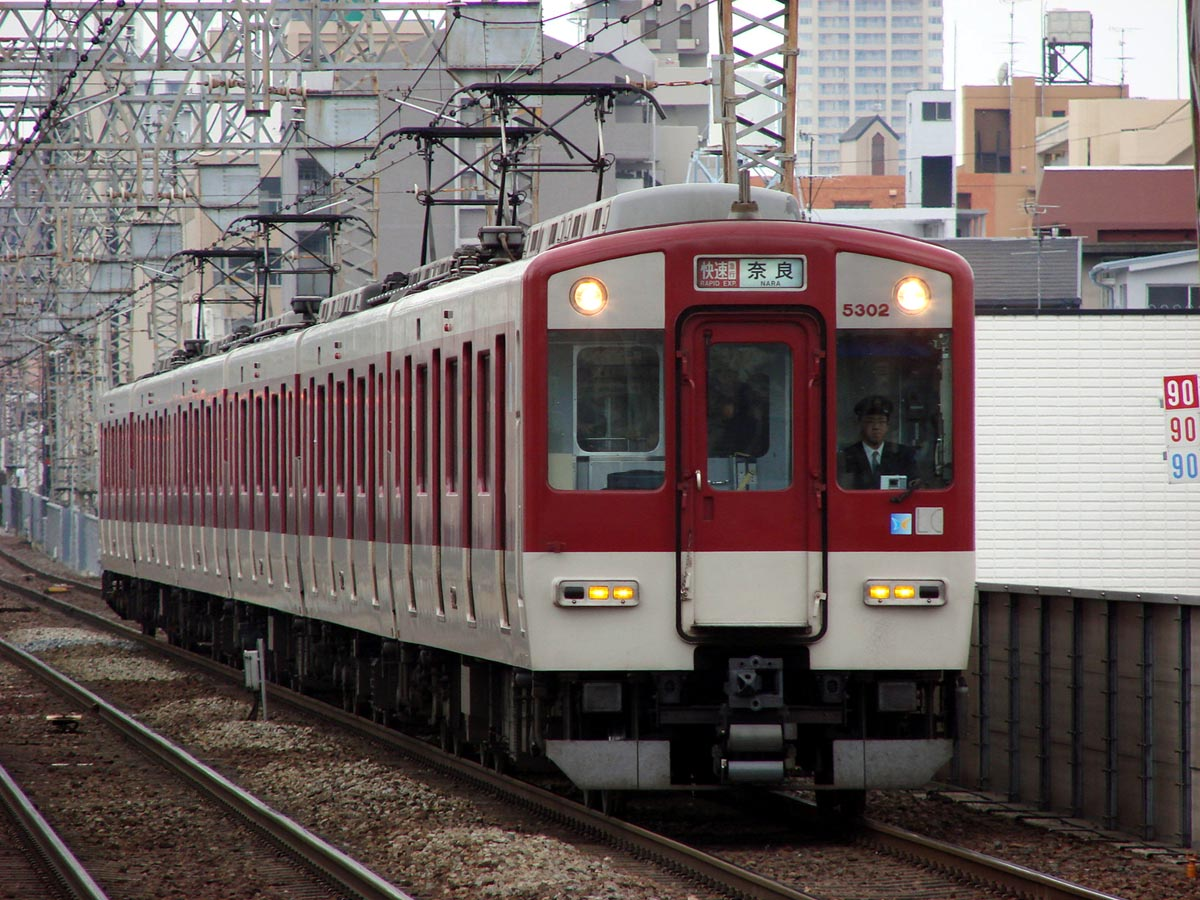
Kintetsu 5800 series

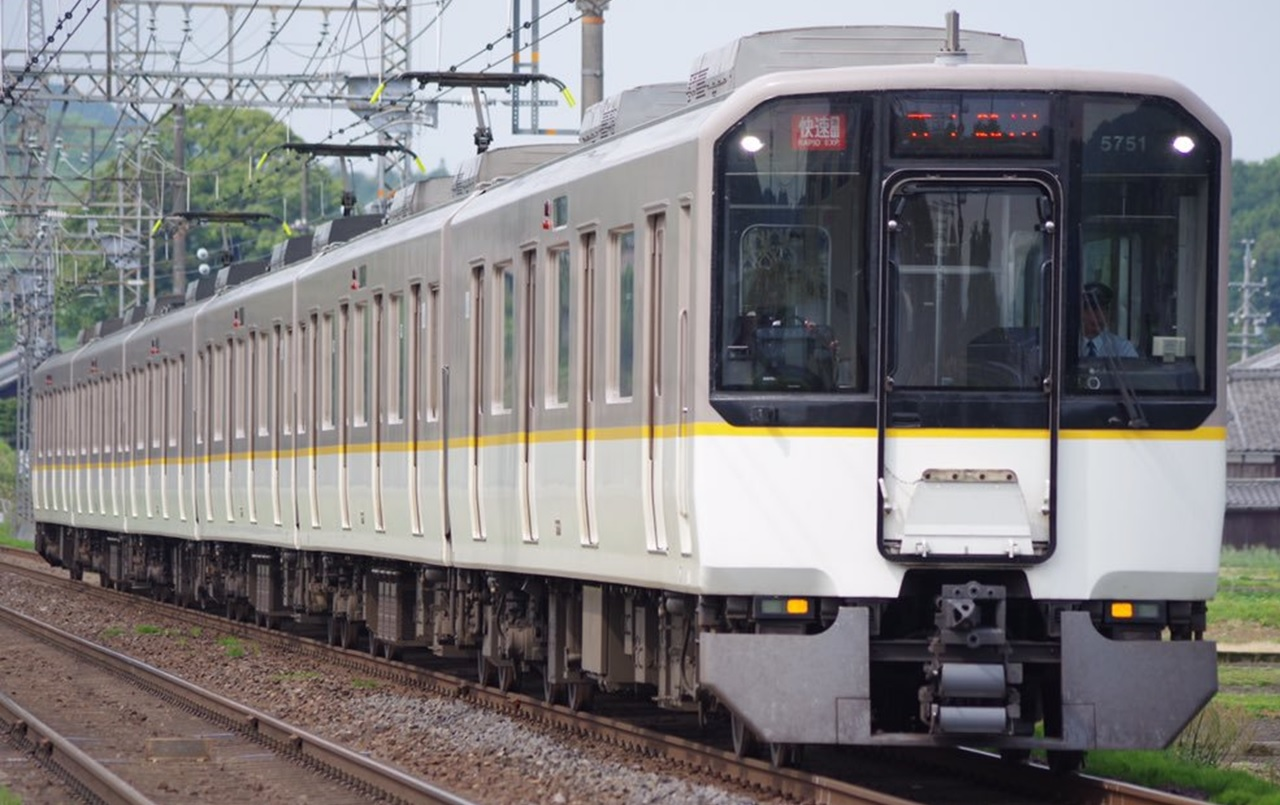
Kintetsu 5820 series

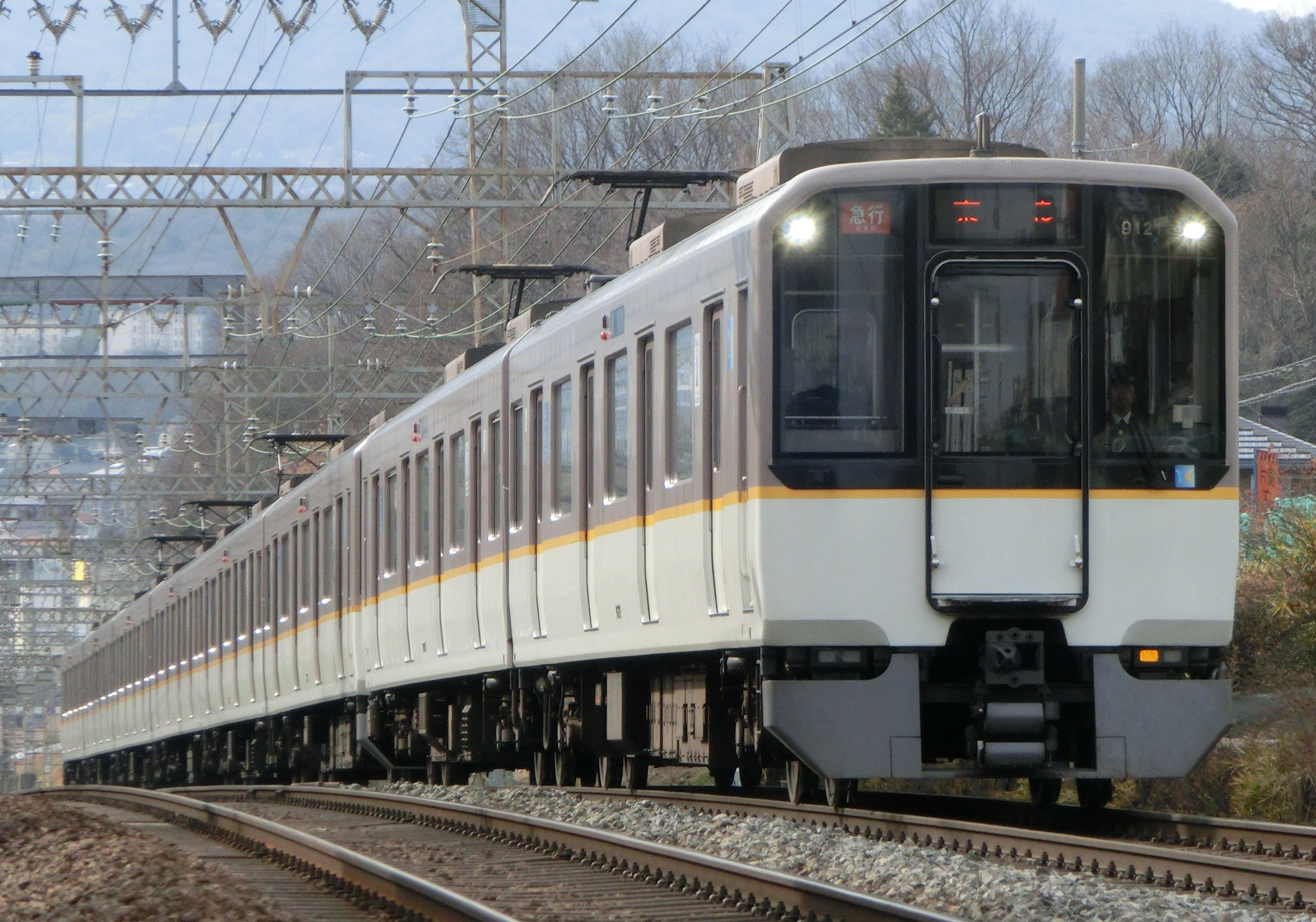
Kintetsu 9020 series

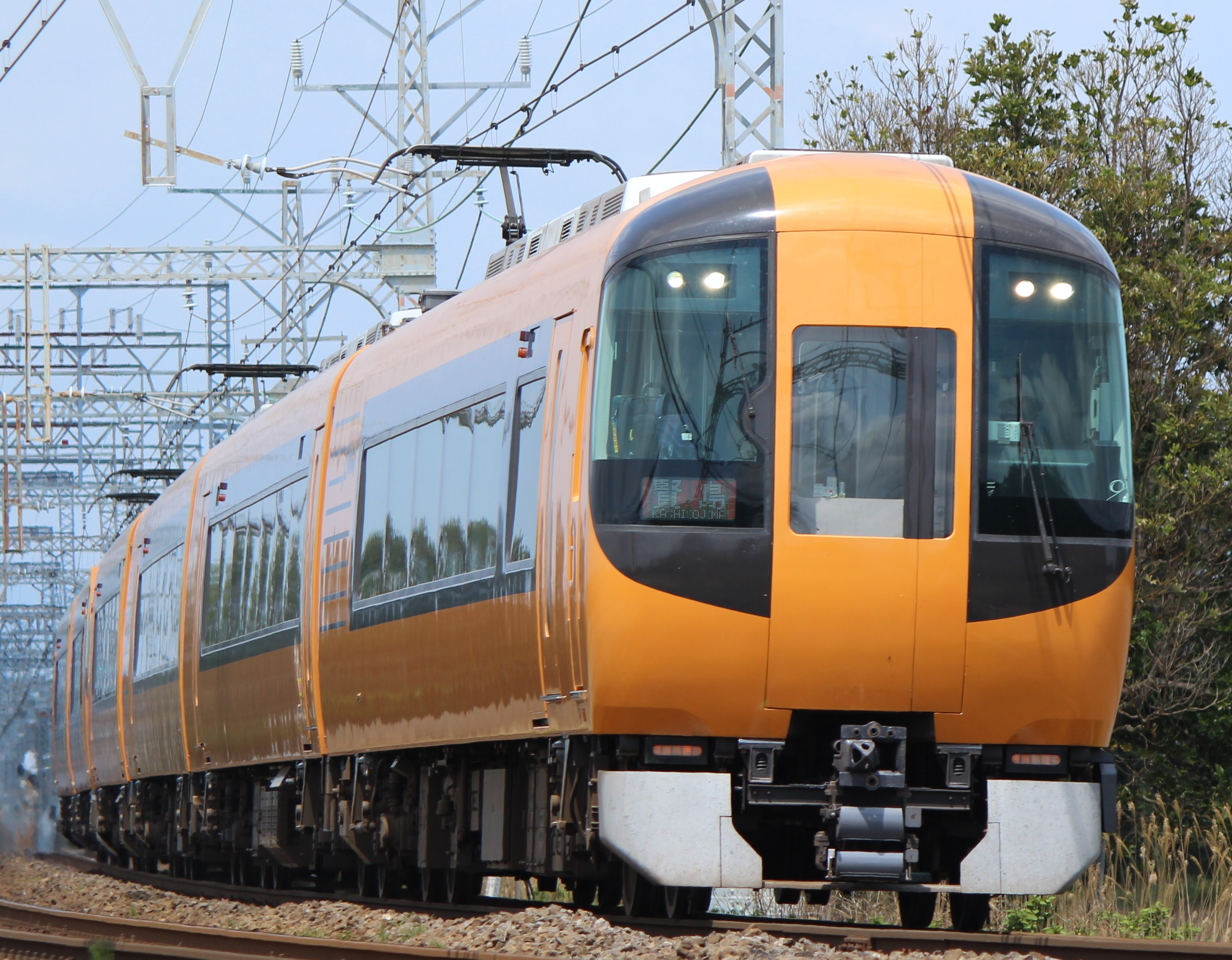
Kintetsu 22600 series
