= Fugu Airport =

Fugu Airport 府谷机场
- IATA: none; ICAO: none

Summary
- Airport type: Public
- Serves: Fugu County, Shaanxi, China

Runways
Direction	Length		Surface
Direction	m	ft	Surface
	2,800	9,186

Fugu Airport (Chinese: 府谷机场) is an airport being constructed to serve Fugu County in northern Shaanxi Province, China. It is located near Sangyuanliang Village, Fugu Town.

The airport project was launched by the Fugu County government in 2009, and received approval from the State Council of China and the Central Military Commission on 23 January 2019. It will be the first county-level airport in Shaanxi.

The airport will have a runway that is 2,800 metres (9,200 ft) long and 45 metres (148 ft) wide (class 4C) and four aircraft parking places. It is projected to handle 450,000 passengers and 1,200 tons of cargo annually by 2025.

== See also ==
- List of airports in China
- List of the busiest airports in China
