= Fugu County =

Coordinates: 39.028°N 111.067°E

Fugu County 府谷县 Fuku
- County
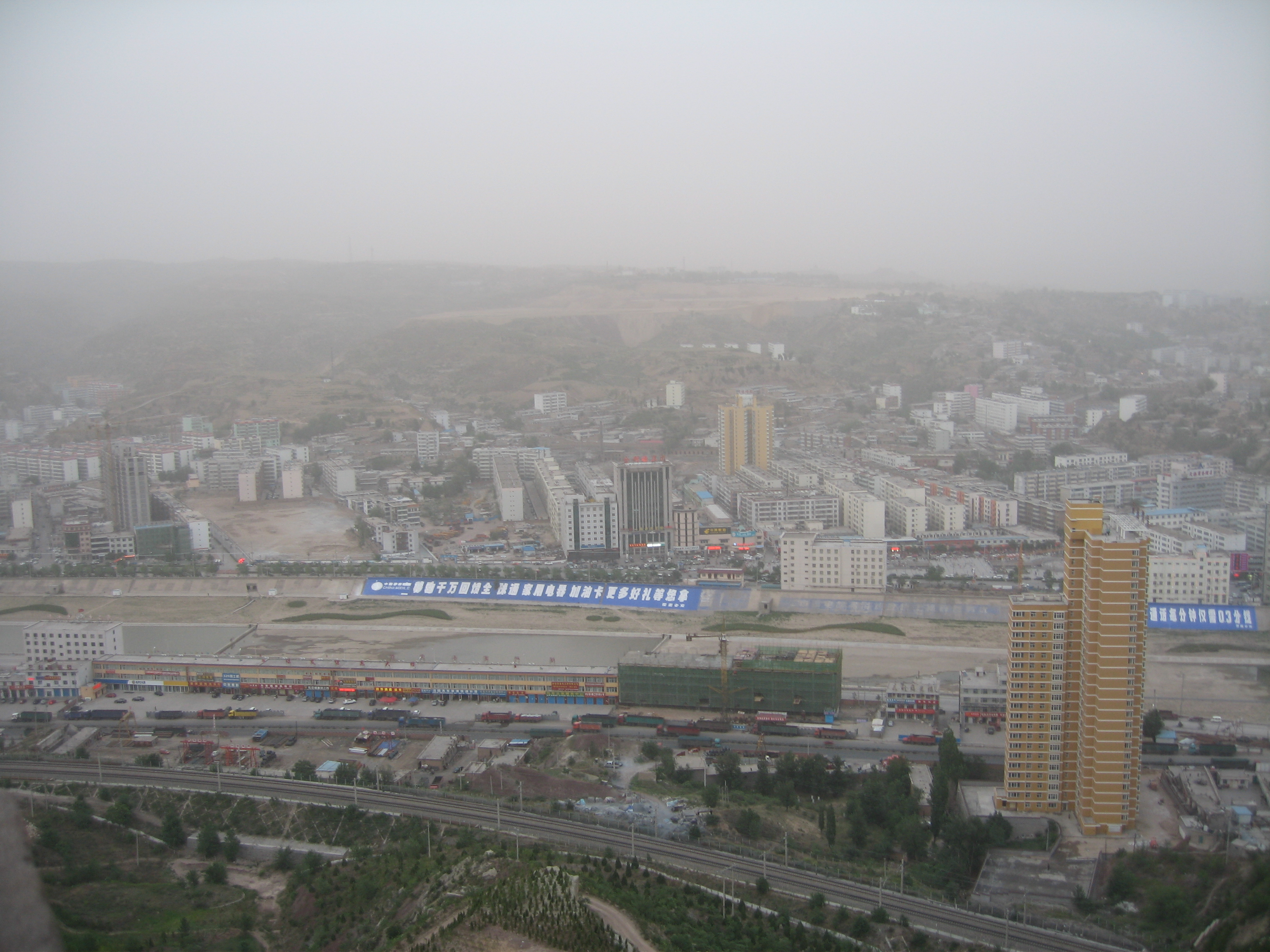

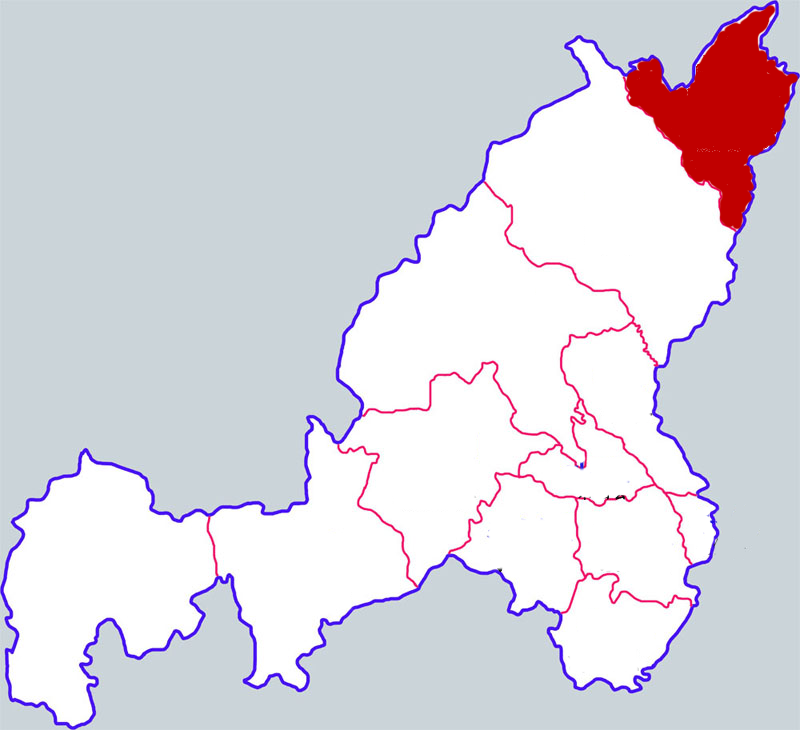
- Fugu in Yulin

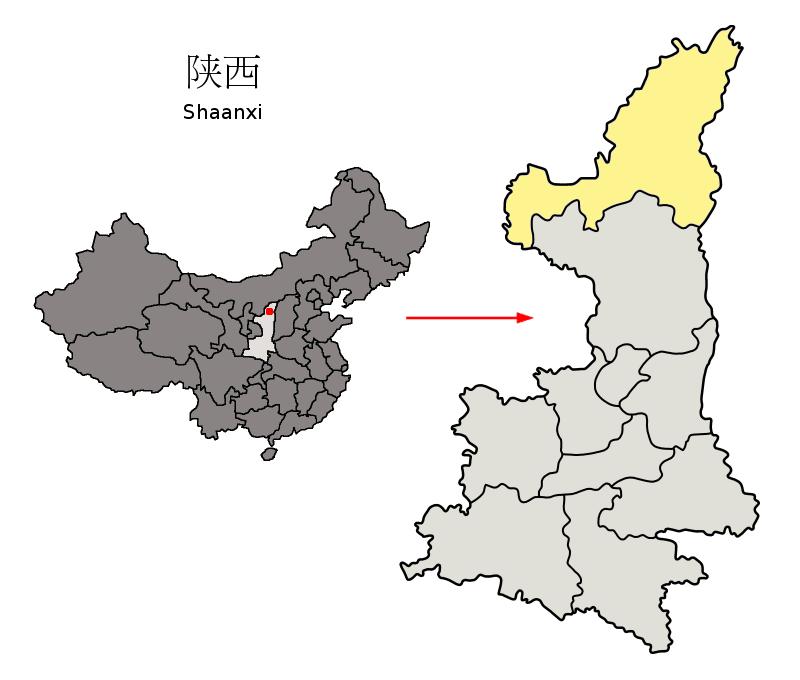
- Yulin in Shaanxi
- Country: People's Republic of China
- Province: Shaanxi
- Prefecture-level city: Yulin
- County established: 1961

Area
  - Total: 3,229 km^{2} (1,247 sq mi)

Population (2018)
  - Total: 248,200
  - Density: 76.87/km^{2} (199.1/sq mi)
- Time zone: UTC+8 (China standard time)
- Postal code: 719400
- Licence plates: 陕K
- Website: www.fg.gov.cn

Fugu (Chinese: 府谷; pinyin: Fǔgǔ) is a county of Yulin, in the north of Shaanxi province, China. It is the northernmost county-level division of the province, bordering Inner Mongolia (banners of Jungar, Ejin Horo) to the north, Shanxi to the east and southeast (counties of Baode, Hequ), and, within Shaanxi, the city of Shenmu to the south and southwest.

== Administrative divisions ==
As of 2019, Fugu County is divided to 14 towns.

Towns

- Fugu (府谷镇)
- Huangfu (黄甫镇)
- Ha (哈镇)
- Miaogoumen (庙沟门镇)
- Xinmin (新民镇)
- Gushan (孤山镇)
- Qingshui (清水镇)
- Dachanghan (大昌汗镇)
- Gucheng (古城镇)
- Sandaogou (三道沟镇)
- Laogaochuan (老高川镇)
- Wujiazhuang (武家庄镇)
- Mugua (木瓜镇)
- Tianjiazhai (田家寨镇)

== Climate ==
Climate data for Fugu, elevation 1,024 m (3,360 ft), (1991–2020 normals, extremes 1981–2010)
Month	Jan	Feb	Mar	Apr	May	Jun	Jul	Aug	Sep	Oct	Nov	Dec	Year
Record high °C (°F)	9.8 (49.6)	19.1 (66.4)	28.0 (82.4)	35.7 (96.3)	35.9 (96.6)	40.7 (105.3)	40.3 (104.5)	36.2 (97.2)	36.7 (98.1)	28.1 (82.6)	21.6 (70.9)	13.3 (55.9)	40.7 (105.3)
Mean daily maximum °C (°F)	−1.4 (29.5)	4.2 (39.6)	11.7 (53.1)	19.7 (67.5)	25.4 (77.7)	29.6 (85.3)	30.8 (87.4)	28.4 (83.1)	23.5 (74.3)	16.7 (62.1)	8.0 (46.4)	0.2 (32.4)	16.4 (61.5)
Daily mean °C (°F)	−7.8 (18.0)	−2.6 (27.3)	4.6 (40.3)	12.4 (54.3)	18.4 (65.1)	22.9 (73.2)	24.5 (76.1)	22.4 (72.3)	17.1 (62.8)	10.1 (50.2)	1.9 (35.4)	−5.7 (21.7)	9.9 (49.7)
Mean daily minimum °C (°F)	−13.0 (8.6)	−8.3 (17.1)	−1.4 (29.5)	5.9 (42.6)	11.9 (53.4)	16.8 (62.2)	19.2 (66.6)	17.5 (63.5)	11.9 (53.4)	4.8 (40.6)	−3.1 (26.4)	−10.5 (13.1)	4.3 (39.8)
Record low °C (°F)	−24.5 (−12.1)	−20.9 (−5.6)	−17.0 (1.4)	−6.7 (19.9)	0.6 (33.1)	4.4 (39.9)	12.3 (54.1)	8.4 (47.1)	0.4 (32.7)	−7.9 (17.8)	−18.1 (−0.6)	−25.7 (−14.3)	−25.7 (−14.3)
Average precipitation mm (inches)	2.9 (0.11)	4.0 (0.16)	8.8 (0.35)	18.6 (0.73)	37.7 (1.48)	48.1 (1.89)	118.4 (4.66)	107.0 (4.21)	60.5 (2.38)	25.2 (0.99)	11.6 (0.46)	2.6 (0.10)	445.4 (17.52)
Average precipitation days (≥ 0.1 mm)	2.2	2.5	3.4	4.5	7.0	9.1	12.1	11.2	9.7	6.0	3.2	2.1	73
Average snowy days	3.6	3.5	2.4	0.7	0.1	0	0	0	0	0.5	2.2	3.2	16.2
Average relative humidity (%)	53	45	37	34	37	45	59	65	63	57	54	53	50
Mean monthly sunshine hours	188.3	197.7	239.3	260.7	292.9	274.0	268.8	245.8	221.3	224.1	192.7	179.0	2,784.6
Percentage possible sunshine	62	65	64	65	66	62	60	59	60	66	65	61	63
Source: China Meteorological Administration

== See also ==
- Fugu Airport
