= Myqerem Fuga =

Albanian politician

Myqerem Fuga was an Albanian politician and chair of the Executive Committee of Tirana from 1970 through 1973.
