= Mitsutarō Fuku =

Japanese photographer

Mitsutarō Fuku (福 光太郎, Fuku Mitsutarō; 1898–1965) was a Japanese photographer.

In 1922, Fuku went to the United States where he worked in the dry goods business in Seattle. In the mid-1930s, he was very active both in the submission of his photographs to various salons and in photographic circles in Seattle, where he also had a solo exhibition in 1935. He returned to Japan in 1936 and the next year had a solo exhibition in Mitsukoshi department store. From 1940 he taught photography at Nihon University for one year. After World War II, Fuku ran a commercial photographic studio in Kyōbashi, Tokyo.
