= Amagasaki Station (Hanshin) =

Railway station in Amagasaki, Hyōgo Prefecture, Japan

Amagasaki Station 尼崎駅
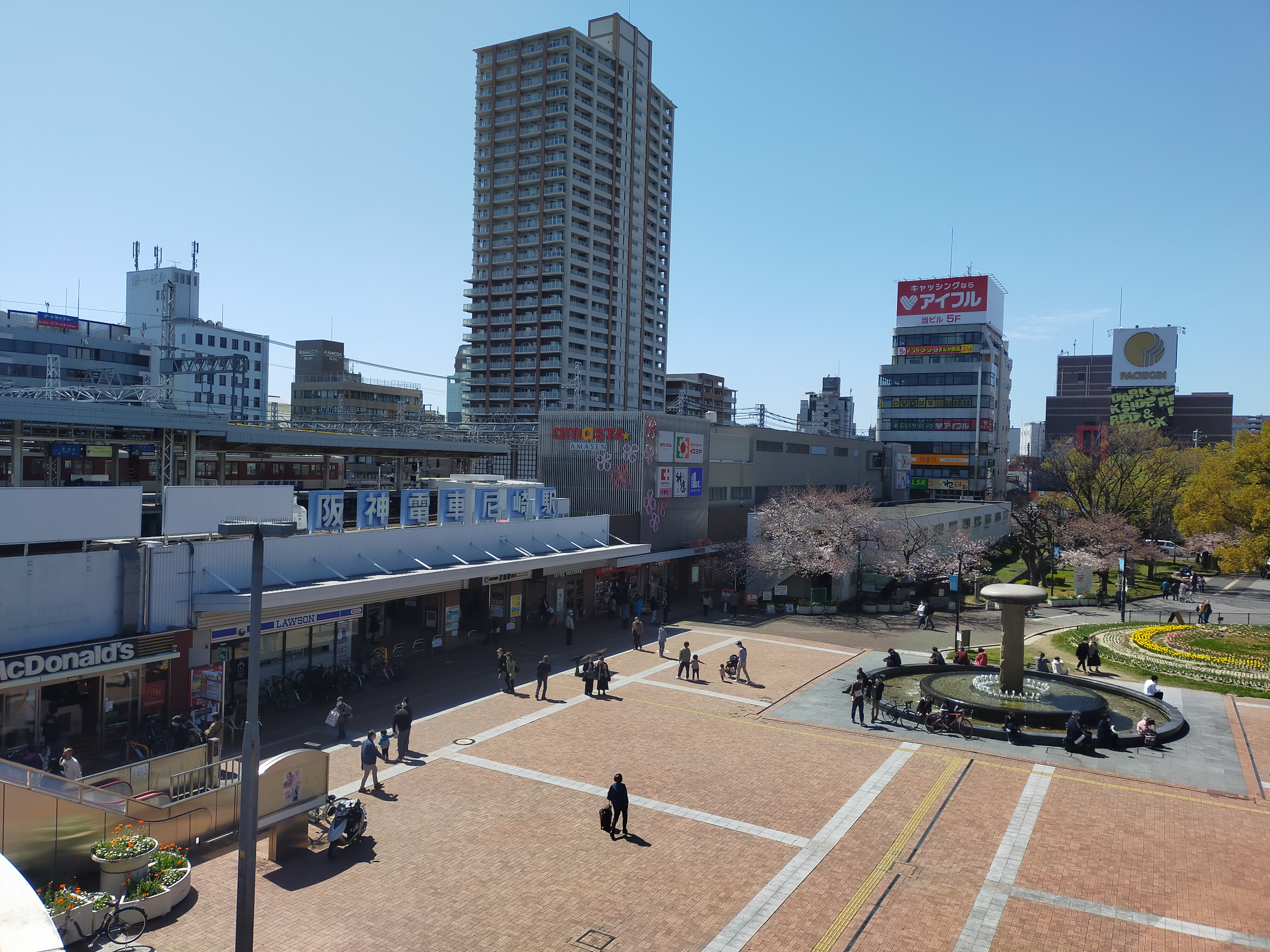
- Amagasaki Station in March 2022

General information
- Location: 93, Higahi-Misonochō, Amagasaki-shi, Hyōgo-ken 660-0861; Japan
- Coordinates: 34°43′7.18″N 135°25′2.31″E
- Operator: Hanshin Electric Railway
- Line: ■ Hanshin Main Line ■ Hanshin Namba Line
- Distance: 8.9 km (5.5 miles) from Umeda
- Platforms: 4 island platforms
- Connections: Bus terminal

Other information
- Status: Staffed
- Station code: HS-09
- Website: Official website

History
- Opened: April 12, 1905

Passengers
- FY2019: 54,487
Location
- Location within Hyōgo Prefecture Location within Japan

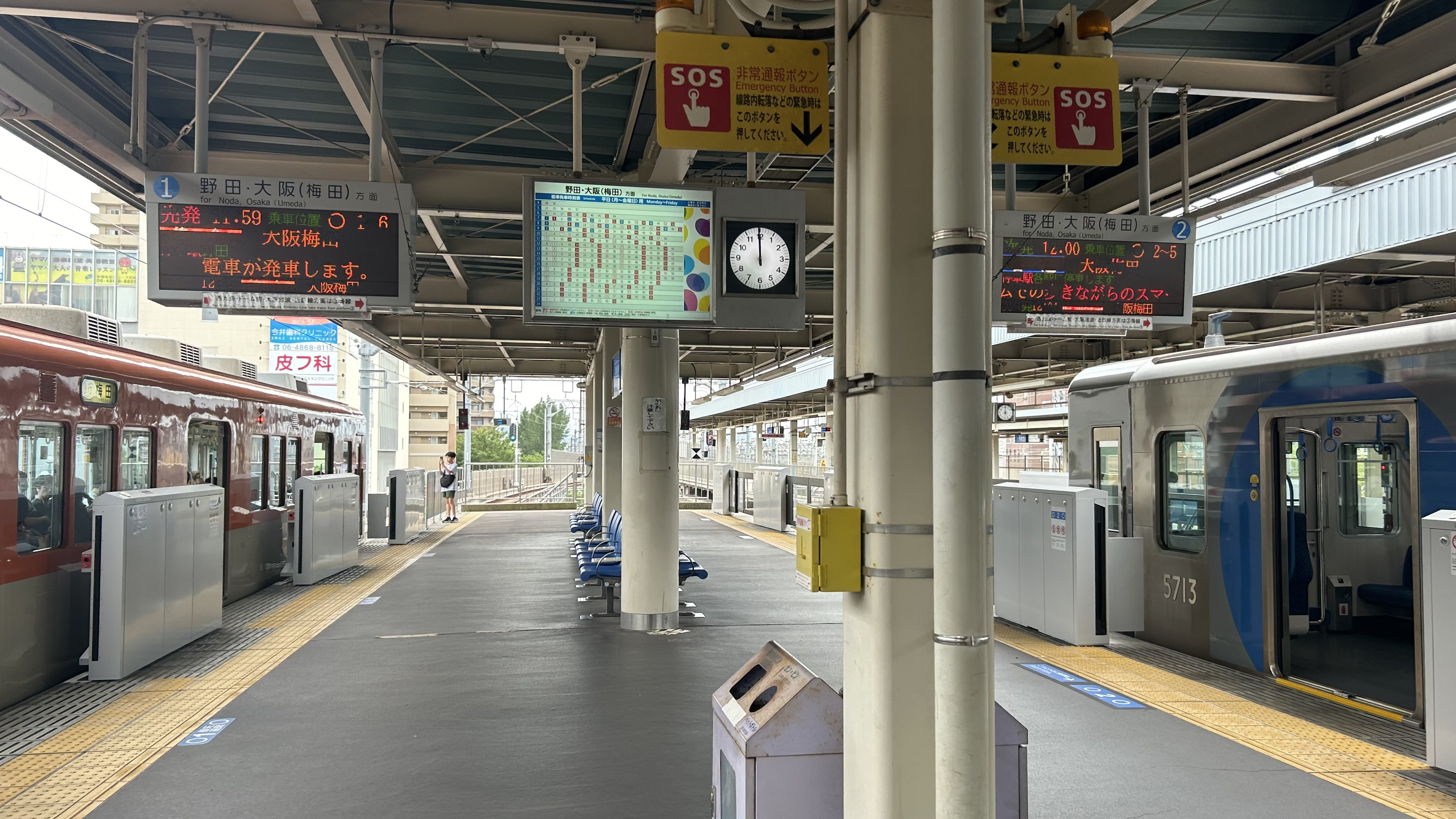
Station platform (2024)

Amagasaki Station (尼崎駅, Amagasaki-eki; station number: HS-09) is a junction passenger railway station located in the city of Amagasaki Hyōgo Prefecture, Japan. It is operated by the private transportation company Hanshin Electric Railway. While this station is situated relatively close to the station of the same name that is operated by JR West, passengers transferring between these two stations must use buses to transfer between trains.

== Lines ==
Amagasaki Station is served by the Hanshin Main Line, and is located 8.9 kilometers from the terminus of the line at Umeda. It is also a terminus for the 10.1 kilometer Hanshin Namba Line.

== Layout ==
The station consists of four elevated island platforms serving two tracks, with Track 2 sharing platforms with both Tracks 1 and 3, and Track 5 sharing platforms with both Tracks 4 and 6. The ticket gates are located on the first floor, and the platforms are on the 2nd floor.

=== Platforms ===
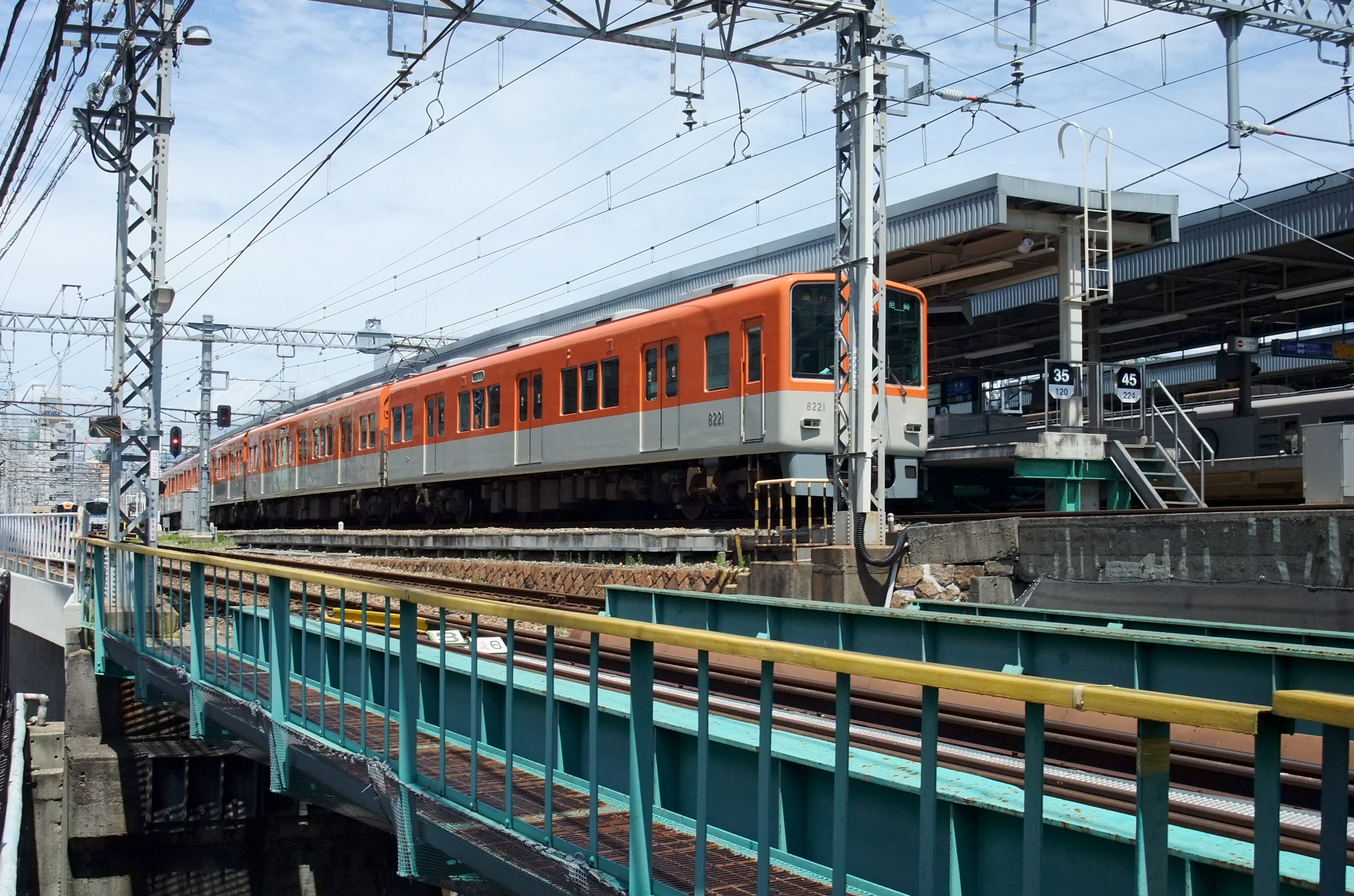
Tracks 6

1	■■Main Line	for Osaka Umeda
2	■■Main Line	for Osaka Umeda
3	■Hanshin Namba Line	for Nishikujo, Dome-mae, Osaka Namba and Nara
4	■Main Line	Rapid express trains from Nara and Osaka Namba for Koshien and Kobe Sannomiya
5	■■Main Line	from Osaka Umeda for Koshien, Kobe Sannomiya, Kōsoku Kōbe, Akashi, and Himeji
6	■■Main Line	from Osaka Umeda for Koshien, Kobe Sannomiya, Kōsoku Kōbe, Akashi, and Himeji

=== Before extension of the Hanshin Namba Line ===
- The repair of the station was started in 2003 for the extension of the Hanshin Namba Line and completed on March 20, 2009.

until November 11, 2006

The station consisted of five tracks and three island platforms, with Track 4 sharing platforms with both Tracks 3 and 6.

1, 2	■■Main Line	for Osaka (Umeda)
3, 4	■■Main Line	for Koshien, Kobe (Sannomiya, Kōsoku Kōbe), Akashi, and Himeji
6	■Nishi-Osaka Line	for Nishikujo

November 12, 2006 - March 16, 2007

The station consisted of five tracks and three island platforms, with Track 5 (former Track 4) sharing platforms with both Tracks 4 (former Track 3) and 6. A new platform was under construction in the north of Track 1. Track 4 became used for the Nishi-Osaka Line trains while Tracks 5 and 6 for the Main Line westbound trains.

New platform		under construction
1, 2	■■Main Line	for Osaka (Umeda)
4	■Nishi-Osaka Line	for Nishikujo
5, 6	■■Main Line	for Koshien, Kobe (Sannomiya, Kōsoku Kōbe), Akashi, and Himeji

March 17, 2007 - February 1, 2008

The station consisted of five tracks and three island platforms, with Track 5 sharing platforms with both Track 4 and 6. A track was situated in the north of the completed platform and assigned as Track 1. Former Track 1 was renumbered Track 2 and the former platform in the south of present Track 2 was closed.

1, 2 (new)	■■Main Line	for Osaka (Umeda)
1, 2 (former)	closed	under renovation
4	■Nishi-Osaka Line	for Nishikujo
5, 6	■■Main Line	for Koshien, Kobe (Sannomiya, Kōsoku Kōbe), Akashi, and Himeji

February 2, 2008 - March 19, 2009

The station consisted of five tracks and three island platforms, with Track 2 sharing platforms with both Tracks 1 and 3. The repair of the platform serving Tracks 2 and 3 was completed and the trains of the Nishi-Osaka Line left from Track 3.

1, 2	■■Main Line	for Osaka (Umeda)
3	■Nishi-Osaka Line	for Nishikujo
4, 5	closed	under renovation
5, 6	■■Main Line	for Koshien, Kobe (Sannomiya, Kōsoku Kōbe), Akashi, and Himeji

== Surroundings ==
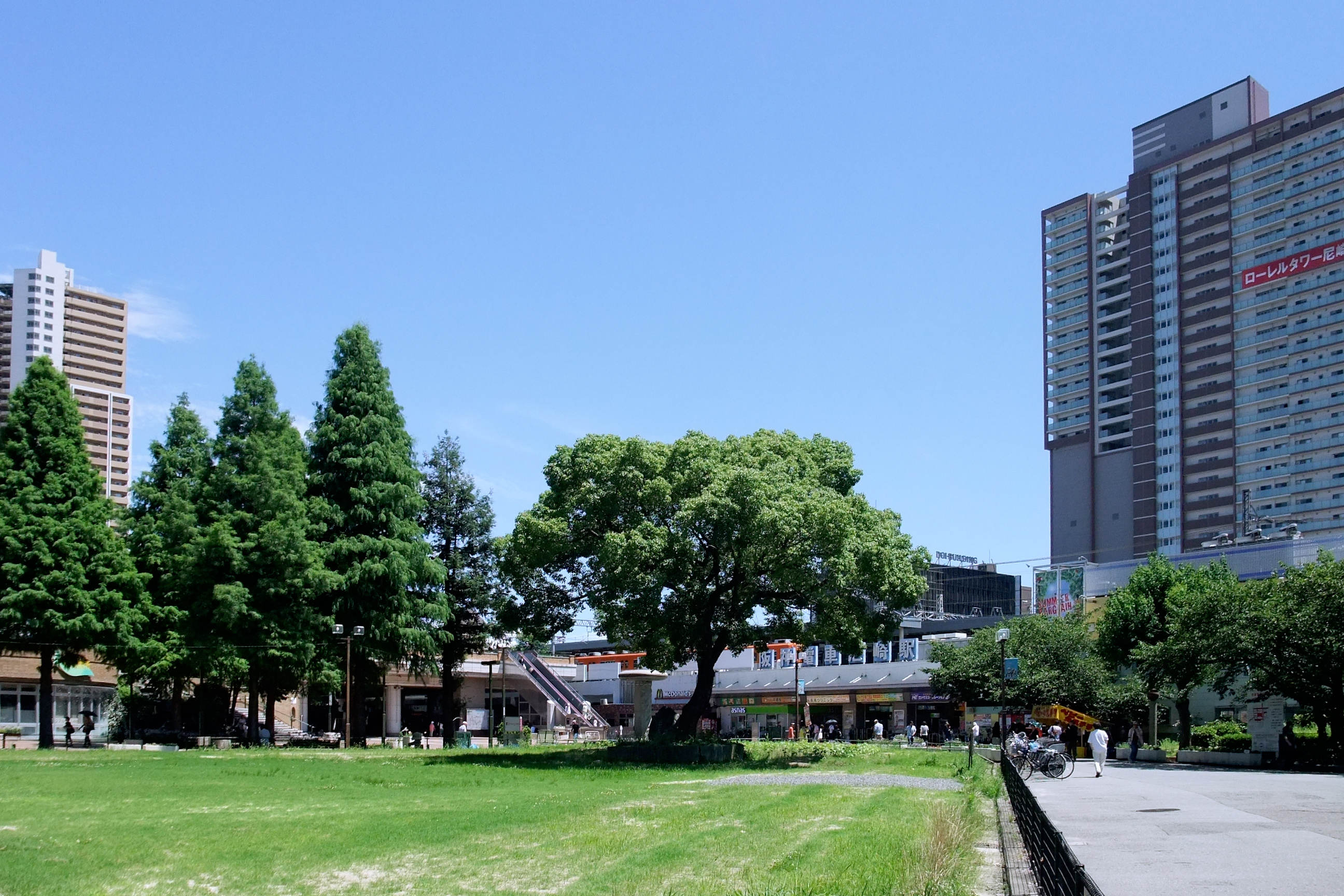
Amagasaki Central Park

- Hanshin Railway Amagasaki Depot, Amagasaki Repairing Area
- Amagasaki Central Park
- Abagasaki-chuo, Sanwa, Deyashiki Shopping Street

== Buses ==
- Hanshin Bus
- Amagasaki City Bus
- Hankyu Bus

== Adjacent stations ==
«	Service	»
Hanshin Railway (HS 09)
Main Line
Daimotsu (HS 08)	Local	Deyashiki (HS 10)
Chibune (HS 06)	Morning Express	Mukogawa (HS 12)
Noda (HS 03)	Express	Mukogawa (HS 12)
Noda (HS 03)	Morning Limited Express (Osaka-Umeda-bound trains only on weekdays)	Koshien (HS 14)
Osaka-Umeda (HS 01)	Limited Express; Through Limited Express	Koshien (HS 14) (except 7 Osaka-Umeda-bound trains on weekday mornings); Nishinomiya (HS 17)
Hanshin Namba Line
Daimotsu (HS 08)	Local	Terminus
Daimotsu (HS 08)	Semi-Express; Suburban Semi-Express	Terminus
Nishikujō (HS 45)	Rapid Express (morning and evening on weekdays)	Koshien (Main Line, HS 14)
Nishikujō (HS 45)	Rapid Express (other)	Mukogawa (Main Line, HS 12)

All rapid express trains pass Chidoribashi, Dempo, Fuku, Dekijima, and Daimotsu every day from March 20, 2012.

== History ==
Amagasaki Station was opened on April 12, 1905 with the opening of the Hanshin Main Line

== Passenger statistics ==
In fiscal 2019, the station was used by an average of 54,487 passengers daily

== Surrounding area ==
- Amagasaki Castle
- Amagasaki Central Park

== See also ==
- List of railway stations in Japan
