= Harold Gould Henderson =

American art historian

Harold Gould Henderson (1889–1974) was an American academic, art historian and Japanologist. He was a Columbia University professor for twenty years. From 1948 through 1952, he was the President of the Japan Society in New York, and in 1968 he cofounded the Haiku Society of America.

== Biography ==
Henderson earned his A.B. from Columbia College of Columbia University in 1910, and continued his studies in Japan between 1930 and 1934. From 1927 through 1929, Henderson was assistant curator of the Far East Department of the Metropolitan Museum of Art in New York City. In 1934, he joined the faculty of Columbia. His academic career was interrupted by military service in the Second World War. At war's end, he returned to Columbia, retiring in 1956.

In 1945 he married Mary A. Benjamin, (1905–1998), "The Autograph Lady", and the daughter of Walter Romeyn Benjamin (1854–1943) and took over her father's business at his passing. Her mother was Rachel Seigne (1875–1954).

In World War II Lieutenant-Colonel Henderson's war service took him to Japan. General Douglas MacArthur's staff during the occupation of Japan included a Monuments, Fine Arts, and Archives (MFAA) section. Among those serving with Henderson in Tokyo were Sherman Lee, Laurence Sickman and Patrick Lennox Tierney.

In Tokyo, Henderson was an advisor on education, religion, and art. Along with Reginald Horace Blyth, he served as a liaison between General MacArthur and Japan’s Imperial household. He participated in the process of drafting the Humanity Declaration in which the Emperor renounced his personal divinity.

In 1974 Henderson was honored the Order of the Sacred Treasure.

== Selected works ==
In a statistical overview derived from writings by and about Harold Henderson, OCLC/WorldCat encompasses roughly 70+ works in 160+ publications in 5 languages and 4,900+ library holdings.

- The Bamboo Broom; an Introduction to Japanese Haiku (1934)
- From the Bamboo Broom (1934)
- The Surviving Works of Sharaku (1939)
- Handbook of Japanese Grammar (1943)
- An Introduction to Haiku; an Anthology of Poems and Poets from Bashō to Shiki Anchor Books/Doubleday & Company (1958)
- Haiku in English (1965)

== See also ==
- Roberts Commission
- Monuments, Fine Arts, and Archives program
- Monuments Men Foundation for the Preservation of Art
