= Higashi-Ikoma Station =

Railway station in Ikoma, Nara Prefecture, Japan

Higashi-Ikoma Station 東生駒駅
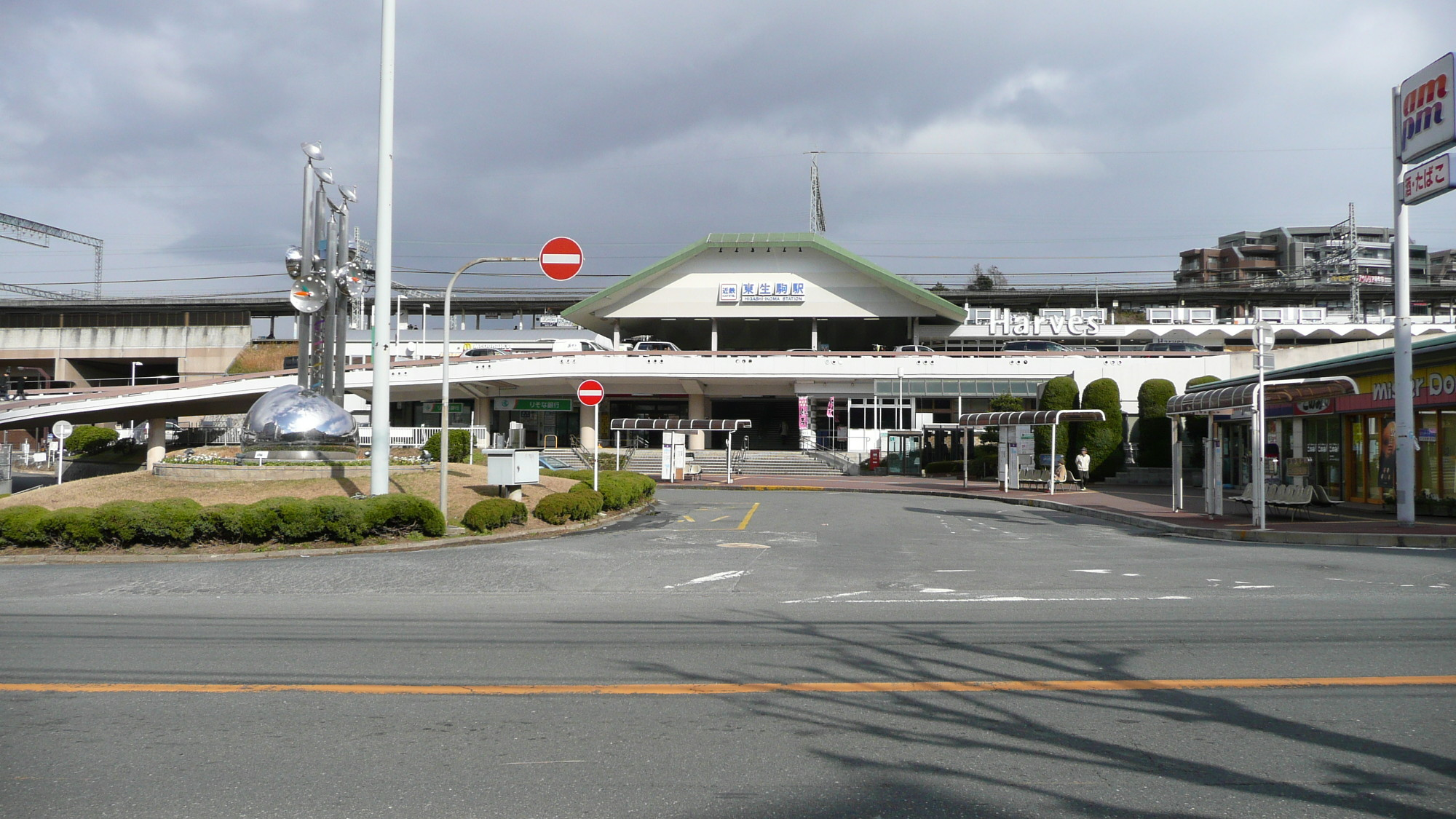
- Higashi-Ikoma Station

General information
- Location: 1-1-6, Higashi-Ikoma, Ikoma, Nara （奈良県生駒市東生駒一丁目1-6） Japan
- Coordinates: 34°41′30″N 135°42′35″E
- Operator: Kintetsu Railway
- Line: Nara Line
- Connections: Bus terminal

Other information
- Station code: A18

History
- Opened: 1968

Passengers
- November 9, 2010: 18,948 daily

Services
Preceding station	Kintetsu Railway	Following station
Ikoma towards Ōsaka Uehommachi	Nara Line Local Suburban Semi-Express Semi-Express	Tomio towards Kintetsu Nara
Location

Higashi-Ikoma Station (東生駒駅) is a railway station on Kintetsu Railway's Nara Line in Ikoma, Nara Prefecture, Japan.

== Building ==
The station has an island platform serving 2 tracks between 2 passing tracks.

=== 1st floor ===
- Bus Terminal (Nara Kotsu)
- Harves
- Resona Bank

=== 2nd floor ===
- Ticket machines and windows (Commuter tickets and limited express tickets available)
- Station office
- Taxi stand
- Harves
- McDonald's
- Automated teller machine of the Bank of Kyoto, Ltd.
- Automated teller machine of Sumitomo Mitsui Banking Corporation

=== 3rd floor ===
2	■ Nara Line	for Gakuen-mae, Yamato-Saidaiji, Nara, Tenri and Kyoto
3	■ Nara Line	for Ikoma, Fuse, Osaka Namba and Amagasaki

A returning track is located in the east of the station. Before the diagram revision in 2006, local trains used the track and returned for Namba during the non-rush hours, and the track is used in the morning and the evening for the local trains returning for Osaka Namba and Amagasaki.

== Surroundings ==
North side

- Kintetsu Higashi-Ikoma Depot (Keihanna Line), Higashi-Hanazono Inspection Area
- Ikoma City Library

South side

- Bus Terminal (Nara Kotsu)
- Kintetsu Cable Network
- NARA IKOMA Rapid Railway Company, Limited
- Mister Donut
- FamilyMart
- Miyawaki Shoten
- Nanto Bank
- National Route 168

East side

- Tezukayama University Higashi-Ikoma Campus (Nara)
- Higashi-Ikoma Post Office

West side

- Ikoma Municipal Ikoma Elementary School
- Ikoma Fire Department

== Bus Terminal ==
- Bus stop 1 (for Tezukayama Jutaku)

- Route 74 for Tezukayama Jutaku via Tezukayama University
- Route 75 for Tezukayama Jutaku
- Route 64 for Tezukayama Jutaku via Satsukidai Jutaku
- Route 文 for Tezukayama University

- Bus stop 2 (for Satsukidai and Oze)

- Routes 62 and 63 for Satsukidai and Oze
- Route 76 for Satsukidai

- Bus stop 3 (for Ikoma Station, for Shiraniwadai, Asukano and Hikarigaoka via Route 167)

- Routes 63, 64, 165, 168, and 文 for Ikoma-eki minamiguchi
- Route 64 for Asukano Center
- Route 165 for Shiraniwadai Station via Asukano Center
- Route 168 and 172 for Hikarigaoka via Asukano Center and Shiraniwadai Station
