= Sickman =

Sickman may refer to:

- Laurence Sickman, American historian of Chinese art
- Sickman, a song on Dirt (Alice in Chains album)
