= Hua Pin =

Deyu Zhai Hua Pin (德隅齋畫品; "Savoring the Paintings of Deyu Zhai"), or simply Hua Pin, is an early 12th-century Chinese art catalogue text by Li Zhi (李廌). Hua Pin in 5 chapters describes and critiques 22 paintings in the collection of Zhao Lingshi, a member of the House of Zhao and a close friend of Li Zhi's teacher Su Shi. The paintings described date from 9th-century Tang dynasty, 10th-century Five Dynasties period, and 11th-century Song dynasty, which are unfortunately all lost today.

The book has been translated into English in full by Alexander Soper in 1949.
