= Charles Lang Freer Medal =

Medal awarded by the Smithsonian Institution

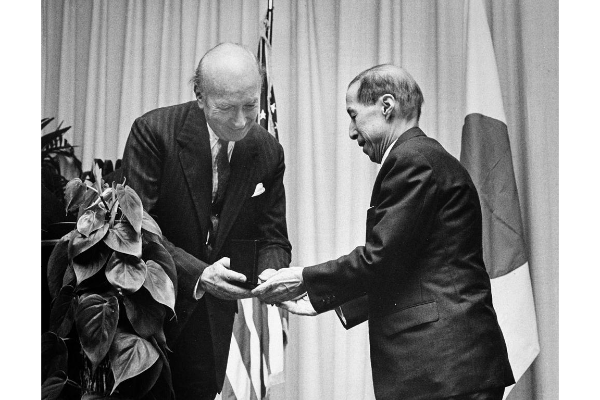
The Smithsonian Institution honors Ichimatsu Tanaka by awarding the Fourth Charles Lang Freer medal in a ceremony in Washington, D.C., on May 2, 1973.

The Charles Lang Freer medal was established in 1956 by the Smithsonian Institution in honor of Charles Lang Freer, the founder of the Freer collection. The medal is conferred intermittently, honoring distinguished career contributions made by scholars in the history of art.

== Recipients ==
- First – Osvald Siren, February 15, 1956.
- Second – Ernst Kühnel, May 3, 1960.
- Third – Yashiro Yukio, September 15, 1965.
- Fourth – Tanaka Ichimatsu, May 2, 1973.
- Fifth – Laurence Sickman, September 11, 1973.
- Sixth – Roman Ghirshman, January 16, 1974.
- Seventh – Max Loehr, May 2, 1983.
- Eighth – Stella Kramrisch, 1985.
- Ninth – Alexander Coburn Soper III, 1990.
- Tenth – Sherman Lee, 1998.
- Eleventh – Oleg Grabar, 2001.
- Twelfth – James F. Cahill, 2010.
- Thirteenth – John M. Rosenfield, 2012.
- Fourteenth – Jessica Rawson, 2017.
- Fifteenth – Vidya Deheija, April 28, 2023.
- Sixteenth – Gülru Necipoğlu, October 27, 2023.
