= Gakuen-mae Station (Nara) =

Railway station in Nara, Nara Prefecture, Japan

Gakuen-mae Station 学園前駅
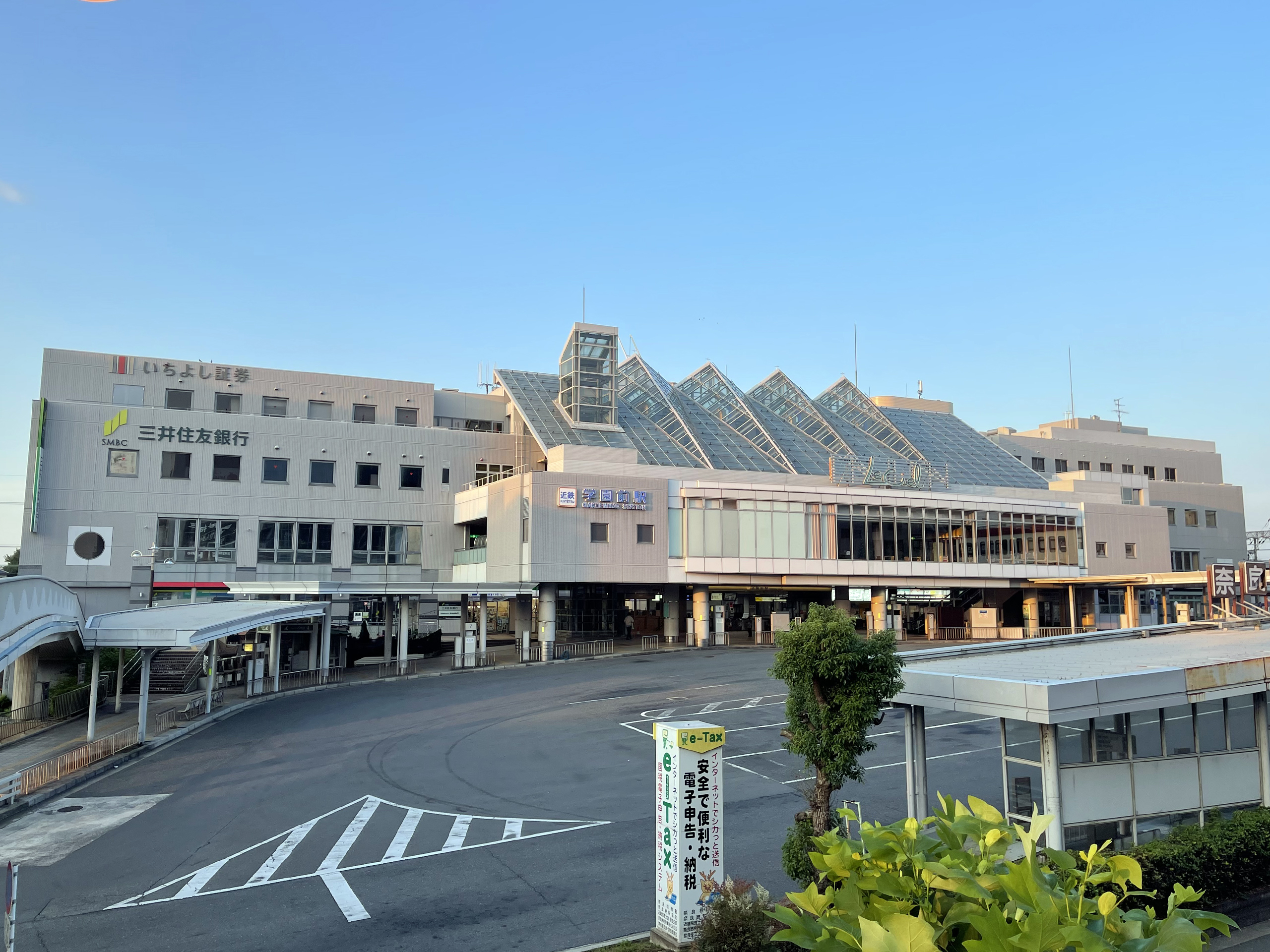
- Gakuen-mae Station in May 2022

General information
- Location: 3-1-1, Gakuen-minami, Nara, Nara （奈良県奈良市学園南三丁目1-1） Japan
- Coordinates: 34°41′50″N 135°45′01″E
- System: Kintetsu Railway commuter rail station
- Owner: Kintetsu Railway
- Operator: Kintetsu Railway
- Line: Nara Line
- Distance: 19.1 km (11.9 miles) from Fuse
- Platforms: 2 side platforms
- Tracks: 2
- Train operators: Kintetsu Railway
- Connections: Bus terminal

Construction
- Cycle facilities: Available
- Accessible: Yes

Other information
- Station code: A20
- Website: www.kintetsu.co.jp/station/station_info/station03018.html

History
- Opened: 6 March 1942

Passengers
- FY2022: 44,017 daily

Services
Preceding station	Kintetsu Railway	Following station
Tomio towards Ōsaka Uehommachi	Nara Line Local Suburban Semi-Express Semi-Express	Ayameike towards Kintetsu Nara
Ikoma towards Ōsaka Uehommachi	Nara Line Express Rapid Express	Yamato-Saidaiji towards Kintetsu Nara
Location

Gakuen-mae Station (学園前駅 (帝塚山学園前), Tezukayama Gakuen-mae eki) is a passenger railway station located in the city of Nara, Nara Prefecture, Japan. It is operated by the private transportation company, Kintetsu Railway.

== Line ==
Gakuen-mae Station is served by the Nara Line and is 19.1 kilometers from the starting point of the line at Fuse and 25.2 kilometers from Ōsaka Namba.

== Layout ==
The station has two opposed side platforms and two tracks. The effective length of the platform is 10 cars. There are two ticket gates, at the north and south exits, which are connected by an underground passage inside and outside the station. The station is built on embankment, giving it the feel of an elevated station. Because it is on a hilly area, the south exit is one level lower than the north exit. It is directly connected to the Nara Kotsu bus stops on the north and south sides of the station. The station is staffed.

== Platforms ==
1	■ A Nara Line	for Yamato-Saidaiji, Nara, Tenri and Kyoto
2	■ A Nara Line	for Ikoma, Fuse, Ōsaka Namba and Amagasaki

== History ==
Gakuen-mae Station was opened 6 March 1942 by the Kansai Kyuko Railway Co. (Kankyu). The station was renamed Tobinomura Station (鵄邑駅, Tobinomura-eki) in September 1941. Kankyu merged with Nankai Railway in 1944, becoming the Kinki Nippon Railway Co, and the station was renamed to its present name on 1 April 1953.

== Passenger statistics ==
In fiscal 2022, the station was used by an average of 44,017 passengers daily (boarding passengers only).

== Surrounding area ==
- Museum Yamato Bunkakan
- Nakano Museum of Art

== See also ==
- List of railway stations in Japan
