= Ichimatsu Tanaka =

Japanese academic, art historian, curator and editor

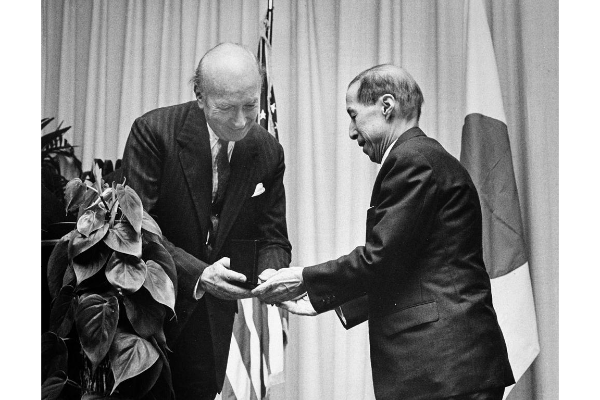
The Smithsonian Institution honors Ichimatsu Tanaka by awarding the Fourth Charles Lang Freer medal in a ceremony in Washington, D.C., on May 2, 1973.

Ichimatsu Tanaka (田中 一松, Tanaka Ichimatsu; December 23, 1895 – April 19, 1983) was a Japanese academic, art historian, curator, editor, and sometime public servant who specialized in the history of Japanese art.

== Early life and education ==
Tanaka was born in Tsuruoka, Yamagata Prefecture.

He attended Shōnai Middle School (庄内中学校) and Tsuruoka High School No. 1 (鶴岡第一高等学校), both in Tsuruoka, before entering Tokyo Imperial University (東京帝國大學) (presently, University of Tokyo) in 1918. He received an undergraduate degree from the Department of Aesthetics and Art History (美学美術史学科) at the same institution in 1923.

== Professional career ==
From 1924-1926 Tanaka served on the staff of the Tokyo Imperial Household Museum (東京皇室博物館) (presently, Tokyo National Museum). From 1952-1953, he served as Chairman of the Department of Fine Arts at the Tokyo National Research Institute for Cultural Properties (東京国立文化財研究所美術部長), and from 1953 to 1965, as 9th Director General (所長) of the same institute. After resigning as Director General, from 1965 to 1977 he was Editor in Chief (主幹) of the prominent art historical journal Kokka (國華). From 1977 until his death in 1983, he served as Editorial Advisor for the same journal.

Tanaka was also an assiduous public servant and active researcher. In 1926, he served on the Committee for the Preservation of Ancient Temples and Shrines (古社寺保存計画調査). In 1935, he participated in an investigate inquiry into the preservation of National Treasures (国宝). In 1936, he served as an ad-hoc member of the Investigative Committee on Important Art Objects (重要美術品等調査委員会). In 1945, he participated in an inquiry into the preservation of National Treasures for the Social Education Bureau (社会教育局) of the Ministry of Education (文部省). In 1947, the Ministry of Education appointed him as a Technical Officer. Beginning in 1950, he worked in the Applied Arts Section of the Conservation Division of the Committee for the Preservation of Cultural Properties (文化財保護委員会保存部美術工芸課), an external bureau of the Ministry of Education that was established this same year. From 1950 to 1966, he served as an Expert Advisor on the Council of Experts on Cultural Properties for the Ministry of Education (文化財専門審議会). In 1958-1959, the Ministry of Education named him Chief Delegate of an official government delegation sent to Europe to facilitate exhibitions of ancient Japanese art in the UK, France, Italy, and the Netherlands. From 1966-1977, he served as a member of the Ministry of Education's Committee for the Preservation of Cultural Properties (文化財保護委員会). From 1972-1973, he served as Vice-Chairman (副会長) of the Comprehensive Scientific Research Committee on the Takamatsuzuka Tomb (高松塚古墳総合学術調査会).

In his later years, while serving as Editor in Chief and later Editorial Advisor at Kokka, he lectured at the following academic institutions: Joshibi University of Art and Design; Nihon University; Tōhoku University; Waseda University; Kanazawa College of Art; and the University of Tokyo.

He also served in various capacities at the following institutions: Japan-China Cultural Exchange Association; Central Art School (中央美術学園, "Chūō Bijutsu Gakuen"); Tochigi Prefectural Museum of Fine Arts; Nezu Institute of Fine Arts (presently, Nezu Museum); Hatakeyama Museum of Art; Idemitsu Museum of Arts; Egawa Museum of Art; Yamatane Museum; Chidō Museum; Museum Meijimura; and Homma Museum of Art, among others.

As a prolific scholar, Tanaka's published writings exhibit extensive range within the field of Japanese art history, including Buddhist art, narrative handscrolls, Yamato-e, ink painting, Rimpa, and Nanga, in addition to Song and Yuan Dynasty Chinese painting and calligraphy. In addition to many book-length works and edited volumes, he also regularly published articles in academic journals. The majority of these articles were republished in three later publications: Nihon kaiga shi no tenbō, Nihon kaiga ronshū, and the two-volume Tanaka Ichimatsu kaiga shi ronshū (see "Selected Works" below).

== Honors ==
- Order of the Rising Sun, Gold Rays with Neck Ribbon, 1967.
- Charles Lang Freer Medal, May 2, 1973.
- Order of the Sacred Treasure, Gold and Silver Star, 1974.

== Legacy ==
During his long career, Tanaka conducted research and in-depth investigations of a wide range of works of art, primarily Japanese and Chinese paintings. In 2008, twenty-five years after his death, Tanaka's personal research notes, written records, and photographic materials were donated to the National Research Institute for Cultural Properties by a surviving family member and the Idemitsu Museum of Arts. Much of this research was carried out prior to World War II, and his personal records include valuable information on many works of art that were subsequently lost during the war. These materials are administered by the Department of Research Programming at the National Research Institute for Cultural Properties.

== Selected works ==
Book-length Works, Edited Volumes, Compendia, and Exhibition Catalogues:

- Nihon emakimono shūsei (日本絵巻物集成, "Compilation of Japanese Scroll Paintings"), 22 vols. Tokyo: Yūzankaku, 1929-1932. (edited, with Mizoguchi Teijirō, Matsuoka Eikyū, Tanaka Chikamatsu, et al.)
- Nagoya rikyū shōhekiga taikan (名古屋離宮障壁画大観, "Survey of Wall and Partition Paintings from Nagoya Imperial Villa"). Tokyo: Jurakusha, 1930-31.
- Sō-Gen meiga shū (宋元名画集, "Masterpieces of Calligraphy from Song and Yuan China"). Tokyo: Jurakusha, 1936. (edited, with Akiyama Teruo and Aimi Kōu)
- Hōryūji Kondō hekiga shū (法隆寺金堂壁畫集, "Wall and Partition Paintings in the Kondō of Hōryūji Monastery").Tokyo: Benridō, 1951.
- Nihon no meiga (日本の名画, "Masterpieces of Japanese Painting"). Tokyo: Dai Nihon Yūbenkai Kōdansha, 1953.
- Sōtatsu (宗達, "[The Art of] Sōtatsu"). Tokyo: Dai Nihon Yūbenkai Kōdansha, 1955.
- Kōgakuteki hōhō ni yoru kobijutsuhin no kenkyū (光学的方法による古美術品の研究, "Studying Old Art Objects with Optical Methods"). Tokyo: Yoshikawa Kōbunkan, 1955.
- Tawaraya Sōtatsu. Kōdansha Library of Japanese Art, no. 6. Rutland, Vt.: Tuttle, 1956. (edited, with English text by Elise Grilli)
- Nihon bijutsushi o kataru (日本美術史を語る, "Narrating the History of Japanese Art"). Tokyo: Gakueisha, 1956.
- Emakimono (絵巻物, "Scroll Paintings"). Tokyo: Dai Nihon Yūbenkai Kōdansha, 1956.
- Momoyama no bi (桃山の美, "Art of the Momoyama Period"). Tokyo: Nihon Keizai Shimbun, 1957.
- Hōryūji hekiga (法隆寺壁画, "Wall Paintings of Hōryūji Temple"), Nihon no meiga (日本の名画, "Masterpieces of Japanese Painting"), vol. 13. Tokyo: Heibonsha, 1958.
- Nihon kaigashi no tenbō (日本絵画史の展望, "Survey of Japanese Painting History"). Tokyo: Bijutsu Shuppansha, 1958.
- Nihon emakimono zenshū (日本絵巻物全集, "Comprehensive Collection of Japanese Scroll Paintings"), 32 volumes. Tokyo: Kadokawa Shoten, 1959-1969.
- Kōrin (光琳, "The Art of Kōrin"). Tokyo: Nihon Keizai Shinbunsha, 1959.
- Nihon bijutsu taikei (日本美術大系, "Survey of Japanese Art), 11 volumes. Tokyo: Kōdansha, 1959-1961. (edited, with Asano Nagatake)
- Kodai kaiga (古代絵画, "Ancient Painting"), Nihon bijutsu taikei, vol. 3. Tokyo: Kōdansha, 1960.
- Sekai meiga zenshū (世界名画全集, "Masterpieces of World Painting"), 40 vols. Tokyo: Kadokawa Shoten, 1960-1968. (edited, with Noma Seiroku, et al.)
- Nihon Bukkyō kaiga (日本仏教絵画, "Japanese Buddhist Painting"), Sekai meiga zenshū (世界名画全集, "Masterpieces of World Painting"), no. 18. Tokyo:1960.
- Nihon bijutsushi (日本美術史, "History of Japanese Art"). Tokyo: Bijutsu Shuppan, 1961. (with Mushakōji Minoru)
- Kazan (崋山, "Art of [Watanabe] Kazan"). Tokyo: Tokyo Chūnichi Shinbun Shuppankyoku, 1962. (edited, with Teizō Suganuma, et al.)
- Suibokuga (水墨画, "Ink Painting"). Genshoku Nihon no bijutsu (原色日本の美術, "Japanese Art"), vol. 11. Tokyo: Shogakkan, 1970. (with Yonezawa Yoshiho)
- Shōhekiga zenshū (障壁画全集, "Japanese Wall and Partition Paintings"), 10 vols. Tokyo: Bijutsu Shuppansha, 1966-1972. (edited, with Doi Tsugiyoshi and Yamane Yūzō)
- Nihon kaigashi ronshū (日本絵画史論集, "Essays on the History of Japanese Painting"). Tokyo: Chuo Koron Bijutsu Shuppan, 1966.
- Gendai Nihonga (現代の日本画, "Modern Nihonga"), 3 vols. Tokyo: Sansaisha, 1967-1968. (with Kitagawa Momo'o and Kawakita Michiaki)
- Tōyō bijutsu (東洋美術, "Asiatic Art in Japanese Collections" (given English title)), 6 vols. Tokyo: Asahi Shinbunsha, 1967-1969. (with Mizuno Seiichi, et al.)
- Sōtatsu Kōrin ha meisaku ten (宗達光琳名作展, "Masterpieces of the Sōtatsu and Kōrin School"). Fukuoka: Fukuoka Prefectural Cultural Center, 1967. (with Yamane Yūzō)
- Genshoku Nihon no bunka (原色日本の文化, "Japanese Culture"). Tokyo: Shōgakkan, 1968. (edited with Sakamoto Tarō, et al.)
- Shūbun kara Sesshū e (周文から雪舟へ, "From Shūbun to Sesshū"). Nihon no bijutsu (日本の美術, "Japanese Art"), no. 12. Tokyo: Heibonsha, 1969.
- Nihon bi no tenkai (日本美の展開, "The Development of Japanese Art"). Sekai no bunka shiseki (世界の文化史跡, "World Cultural Heritage"), vol. 8. Tokyo: Kōdansha, 1969. (with Mushakōji Minoru)
- Gotō bijutsukan (五島美術館, Gotoh Art Museum). Nihon no bijutsukan (日本の美術館, "Japanese Art Museums") series. Tokyo: Mainichi Shinbunsha, 1971. (edited with Koyama Fujio, et al.)
- Nihon no meiga (日本の名画, "Masterpieces of Japanese Painting"), 50 volumes. Tokyo: Kōdansha, 1972-. (edited with Hijikata Tei'ichi and Kawakita Michiaki)
- Heibonsha Survey of Japanese Art, 31 volumes. New York: Weatherhill, 1972-. (edited, with Takahashi Sei'ichirō, et al.)
- Japanese Ink Painting. Heibonsha Survey of Japanese Art, vol 12 . New York: Weatherhill, 1974. (translated by Bruce Darling)
- Nihon Bukkyō bijutsu no hihō (日本仏教美術の秘宝, "Secret Treasures of Japanese Buddhist Art in Private Collections"). Tokyo: Sansaisha, 1973.
- Suiboku bijutsu taikei (水墨美術大系, "Survey of Ink Painting"), 15 volumes. Tokyo: Kōdansha, 1973-1977. (edited with Daiichi Shuppan Sentā, et al)
- Sesshū, Sesson (雪舟・雪村, "Sesshū and Sesson"). Suiboku bijutsu taikei, vol. 7. Tokyo: Kōdansha, 1973. (with Nakamura Tanio)
- Kaō, Mokuan, Minchō (可翁・黙庵・明兆, "Kaō, Mokuan, and Minchō"). Suiboku bijutsu taikei, vol. 5. Tokyo: Kōdansha, 1974.
- Hakubyōga kara suibokuga e no tenkai (白描画から水墨画への展開, "The Development from Plain-line Painting to Ink Painting"). Suiboku bijutsu taikai, vol. 1. Tokyo: Kōdansha, 1975. (with Yonezawa Yoshiho)
- Nihon no butsuga dai ikki (日本の仏画第一期, "Japanese Buddhist Paintings, Series I"), 10 volumes. Tokyo: Gakushū Kenkyūsha, 1976-1977. (edited, with Kameda Tsutomu and Takasaki Fujihiko).
- Nihon no butsuga dai niki (日本の仏画第二期, "Japanese Buddhist Paintings, Series II"), 10 volumes. Tokyo: Gakushū Kenkyūsha, 1977-1978. (edited, with Kameda Tsutomu and Takasaki Fujihiko).
- Nihon no sansuiga ten (日本の山水画展, "Exhibition of Japanese Landscape Painting"). Tokyo: Asahi Shinbun Tōkyō Honsha Kikakubu, 1977. (with Yonezawa Yoshiho and Kikuchi Sadao)
- Nihon bijutsu kaiga zenshū (日本美術絵画全集, "Comprehensive Survey of Japanese Painting"), 25 volumes. Tokyo: Shūeisha, 1977-1980. (edited, with Matsushita Takaaki, et al.)
- Nihon bijutsu zenshū (日本美術全集, "Comprehensive Survey of Japanese Art"), 25 vols. Tokyo: Gakken, 1977-1981. (edited, et al.)
- Uemura Shōen: sono hito to geijutsu (上村松園：その人と芸術, "Uemura Shōen: Her and her Art"). Tokyo: Yamatane Bijutsukan, 1978. (with Tajika Kenzō, et al.)
- Study of Paintings in Gold and Silver by Sōtatsu with Calligraphy by Kōetsu" (光悦書宗達金銀泥絵研究編, Kōetsu-sho Sōtatsu kingin doroe kenkyū hen). Tokyo: Asahi Shinbunsha, 1978.
- Kokuhō Tsuzureori Taima Mandara (国宝綴織大麻曼荼羅, "National Treasure: Taima Mandala Tapestry"). Tokyo: Kōsei Shuppansha, 1978. (with Tatsumura Heizō)
- Kaikan jūgo shūnen kiken ten zuroku (開館十五周年展図録, "Catalog Commemorating the Fifteenth Anniversary of the Opening of the Idemitsu Museum of Arts"). Tokyo: Idemitsu Bijutsukan, 1981.
- Kobayashi korekushon ten (小林コレクション展, "Exhibition of the Kobayashi Collection"). Tokyo: Nezu Institute of Fine Arts, 1981. (with Kawai Masatomo)
- MOA Bijutsukan meihō taisei kaiga hen (MOA美術館名宝大成絵画編, "Treasures of Painting from the MOA Museum of Art"). Tokyo: Kōdansha, 1983. (edited with Tanikawa Tetsuzō, et al.)
- MOA Bijutsukan meihō taisei shoseki chōkoku kōgei hen (MOA美術館名宝大成絵画編, "Treasures of Calligraphy, Sculpture, and Applied Arts from the MOA Museum of Art"). Tokyo: Kōdansha, 1983. (edited with Tanikawa Tetsuzō, et al.)
- Tanaka Ichimatsu Sensei ibun (田中一松先生遺文, "Unpublished Paper by Mr. Ichimatsu Tanaka"). Tokyo: Tanaka Ichimatsu Sensei Tsuitōshiki Sewanin kai, 1983. (posthumous publication)
- Sesshū: Gagyō shūsei (雪舟：画業聚成, "Sesshū: Catalogue Raisonné"). Tokyo: Kōdansha, 1984. (with Matsushita Takaaki, Nakamura Tanio, and Kanagawa Hiroshi)
- Tanaka Ichimatsu kaiga shi ronshū (田中一松絵画史論集, "Collection of Essays by Tanaka Ichimatsu on the History of Painting"), 2 vols. Tokyo: Chūō Kōron Bijutsu Shuppan, 1985-1986. (posthumously published; edited by Tanaka Ichimatsu Kaigashi Ronshū Kankōkai)
