= Ernst Kühnel =

German art historian

Ernst Kühnel (1882−1964) was a German art historian who specialized in Islamic art. He was notable for his research on the connection between Islamic and Coptic art, particularly in textiles. Kühnel served as director of the Museum of Islamic Art (part of the Berlin State Museums) from 1931 to 1951, and was a professor at the University of Berlin from 1935 to 1954. He was also a consultant for the Textile Museum in Washington, D.C., and president of Deutsche Orient-Gesellschaft (German Oriental Society).

In 1960, Ernst Kühnel became the second person to be awarded the Charles Lang Freer Medal by the Smithsonian Institution.

Kühnel died on 12 August 1964, at the age of 81.

== Major works ==
- Late Antique Coptic and Islamic Textiles of Egypt, with W. F. Volbach (London, 1926)
- "La Tradition copte dans les tissus musulmans" (Bulletin de la Société d'archéologie copte 4, 1938, pp. 79−89)
- "Koptische Kunst im islamischen Ägypten" (in Koptische Kunst, Christentum am Nil: Catalogue of the Exhibition in the Villa Hügel, Essen, May–August 1963, Essen, 1963, pp. 153−6)
- "Nachwirkungen der koptischen Kunst im islamischen Ägypten" (in Christentum am Nil. Internationale Arbeitstagung zur Ausstellung "Koptische Kunst" Essen, Villa Hügel, 23.-25.7.1963, Recklinghausen, 1964, pp. 257−9).
