= Nakano Museum of Art =

- 中野美術館
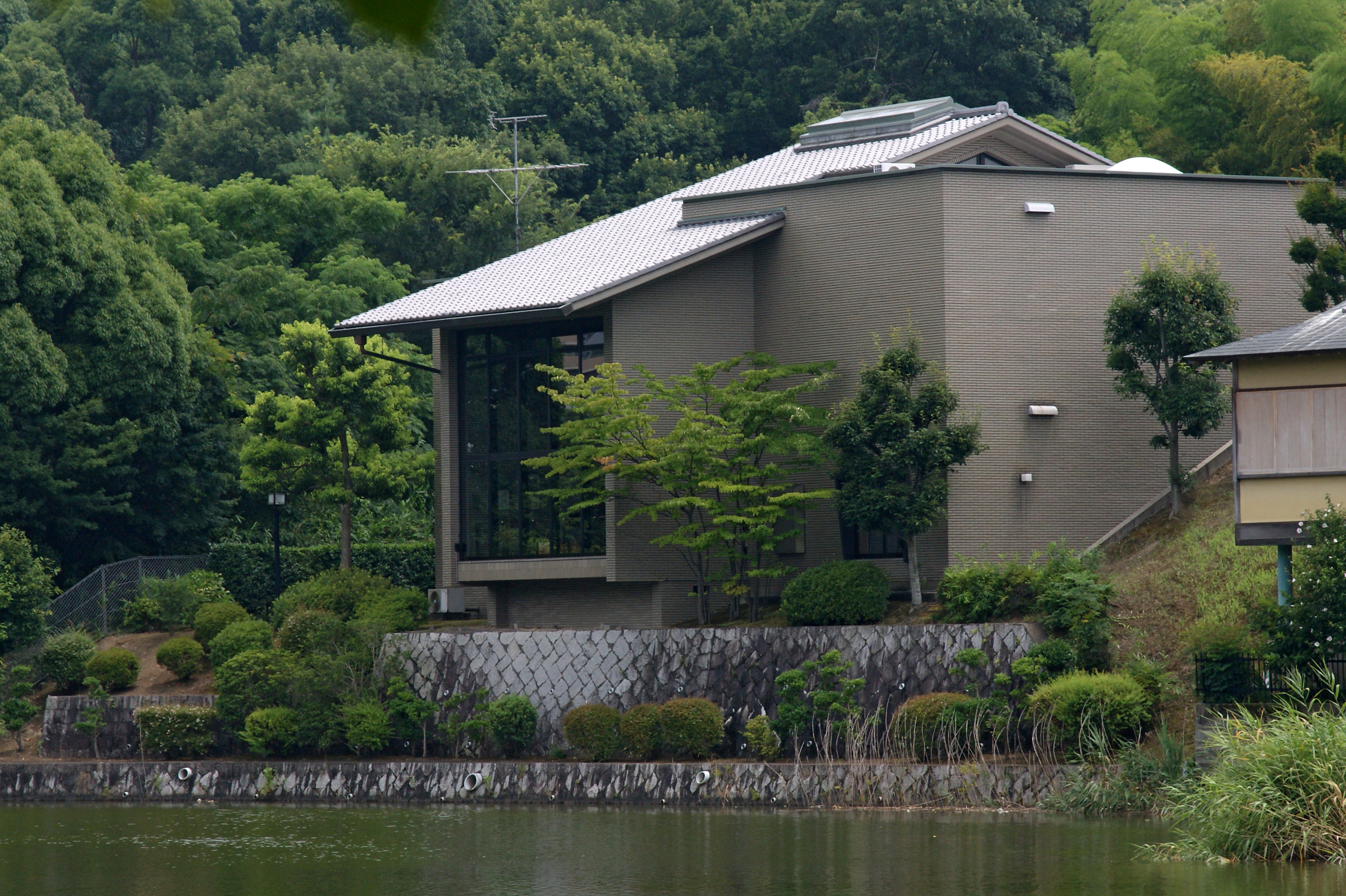
- Interactive map of the Nakano Museum of Art area

General information
- Location: 946-2 9-Chōme, Ayameike-minami, Nara, Nara Prefecture, Japan
- Coordinates: 34°41′39″N 135°45′21″E
- Opened: March 1984

Website
- www.nakano-museum.jp

Nakano Museum of Art (中野美術館, Nakano Bijutsukan) opened in Nara, Japan, in 1984. Located across Kaerumata Pond (蛙股池) from the Yamato Bunkakan, the museum's collection of Meiji, Taishō, and Shōwa yōga, nihonga, sculptures, and copper-plate engravings, built up by Nakano Kanji (中野皖司), includes works by Asai Chū, Nakamura Tsune, Kishida Ryūsei, Suda Kunitarō (須田国太郎), and Yokoyama Taikan.

== See also ==
- Nara National Museum
