= Vidya Dehejia =

Indian art historian and curator

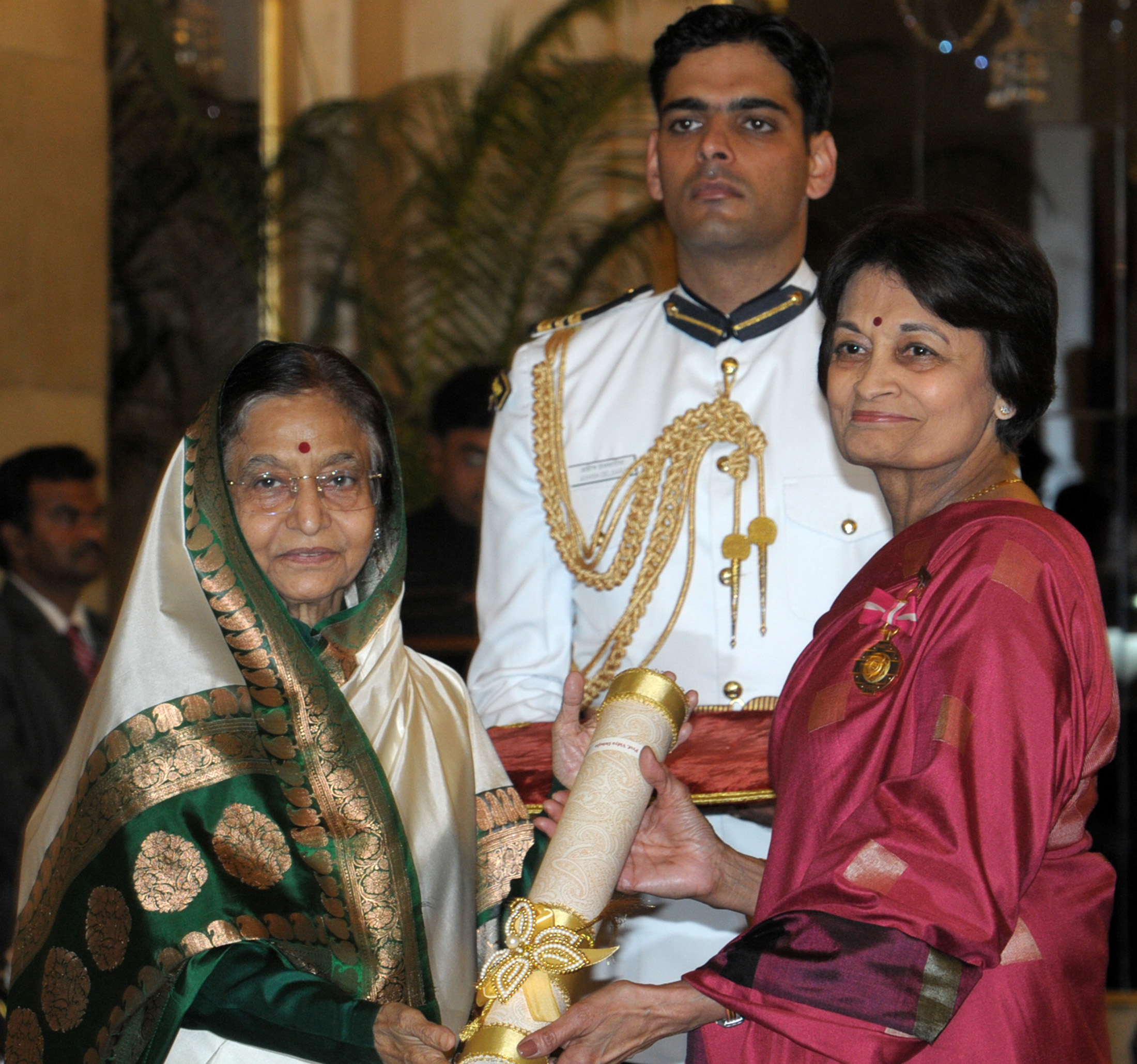
- Dehejia receiving the Padma Bhushan award from President Pratibha Devisingh Patil in 2012
- Born: Bombay, India
- Awards: Padma Bhushan; Charles Lang Freer Medal

Academic background
- Education: University of Cambridge; St. Xavier's College, Mumbai

Academic work
- Discipline: Art history
- Main interests: Yogini Cult and Temples

Vidya Dehejia is a retired academic and the Barbara Stoler Miller Professor Emerita of Indian and South Asian Art at Columbia University. She has published 24 books and numerous academic papers on the art of South Asia, and has curated many exhibitions on the same theme.

She has been awarded the Padma Bhushan by the Indian government and a Freer Medal from the Smithsonian's National Museum of Asian Art.

== Education ==
Vidya Dehejia was educated at St. Xavier's College, Mumbai, where she gained a first in ancient Indian culture in 1961. She gained a first in archaeology and anthropology at Newnham College, Cambridge in 1963. She completed her PhD on early Buddhist caves of Western India in 1968, also at Cambridge.

== Career ==
In 1968, she took up a post-doctoral fellowship at the University of Sydney. In 1970 she became a lecturer at the University of Hong Kong. In 1973 she moved to a lectureship at the Delhi School of Planning and Architecture. In 1982 she became an associate professor at Columbia University. In 1994, she moved to the Smithsonian Institution, becoming the chief curator and deputy director of its Freer Gallery of Art and Arthur M. Sackler Gallery. In 2002 she became Barbara Stoler Miller Professor of Indian Art at Columbia University, and in 2003 she became the director of that university's South Asian Institute.

== Awards and distinctions ==
Dehejia was awarded the Padma Bhushan by the Indian government. She has been appointed to the Mario Miranda Visiting Research Professorship at Goa University. She served on the Humanities jury for the Infosys Prize in 2019.

Dehejia was named the fifteenth recipient of the Freer Medal in 2023, and is the first scholar of South Asian art to receive the award.

== Books ==
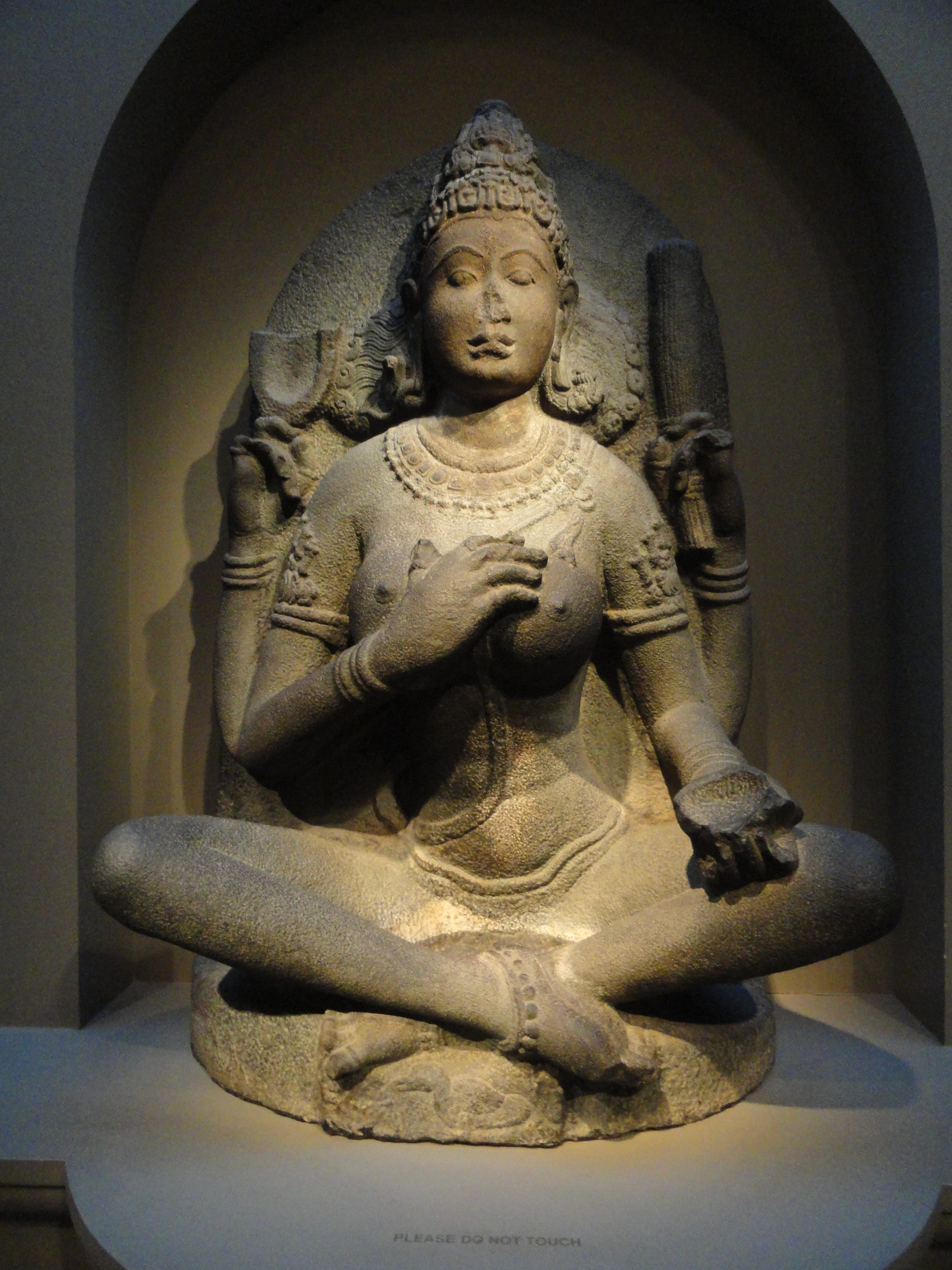
A 10th century Yogini from Kaveripakkam, now in Arthur M. Sackler Gallery, where Dehejia was chief curator; in 1986, she wrote a pioneering book on India's yogini temples.

- Namakkal Caves. Madras: Tamil Nadu State Department of Archaeology, 1968.
- Early Buddhist Rock Temples. London: Thames & Hudson, London, 1972.
- Living and Dying: An Enquiry into the Enigma of Life after Death. New Delhi: Vikas Publishers, 1979.
- Things of Beauty. New Delhi: Publications Division, Government of India, 1979. [A book on Indian art for children, to mark the International Year of the Child.]
- Looking Again at Indian Art. New Delhi: Publications Division, Government of India, 1978.
- Early Stone Temples of Orissa. Durham, North Carolina: Carolina Academic Press, 1979.
- (With Pratapaditya Pal). From Merchants to Emperors: British Artists and India 1757–1930. Ithaca, New York: Cornell University Press, 1986.
- Yogini Cult and Temples. A Tantric Tradition. New Delhi: The National Museum, 1986. – A pioneering work on India's Yogini temples.
- “Impossible Picturesqueness.” Edward Lear's Indian Watercolors. 1873–1875. New York: Columbia University Press, 1988.
- (Editor) Royal Patrons and Great Temple Art. Bombay: Marg Publications, 1988.
- Slaves of the Lord: The Path of the Tamil Saints. New Delhi: Munshiram Manoharlal, 1988.
- Antal and her Path of Love: Poems of a Woman Saint from South India. Albany: SUNY Press, 1990.
- Art of the Imperial Cholas. (The Polsky lectures for 1987). New York: Columbia University Press, 1990.
- (Editor) The Legend of Rama: Artistic Visions, Bombay: Marg Publications, 1994.
- (Editor) Unseen Presence: The Buddha and Sanchi, Bombay: Marg Publications, 1996.
- Discourse in Early Buddhist Art: Visual Narratives of India. New Delhi: Munshiram Manoharlal Publishers, 1997.
- (Editor) Representing the Body: Gender Issues in Indian Art. New Delhi: Kali for Women, 1997.
- Indian Art. Art and Ideas. London: Phaidon, 1997.
- Devi, The Great Goddess: Female Divinity in South Asian Art, Washington D.C., Ahmedabad, Cologne: Arthur M. Sackler Gallery, Mapin Publishing, Prestel Verlag, 1999.
- India through the Lens: Photography 1840–1911, Washington D.C., Ahmedabad, Cologne: Freer Gallery of Art and Arthur M. Sackler Gallery, Mapin Publishing, Prestel Verlag, 2000.
- The Sensuous and the Sacred: Chola Bronzes from South India, New York: American Federation of Arts, 2002.
- Chola. Sacred Bronzes of Southern India. London: Royal Academy of Arts, 2006. Catalogue essay “Beauty and the Body of God,” and all Catalogue entries.
- Delight in Design: Indian Silver for the Raj, Mapin Publications, India, 2008.
- The Body Adorned: Dissolving Boundaries between Sacred and Profane in India’s Art, Columbia University Press, New York & Mapin Publications, India, 2009.

== Major exhibitions ==
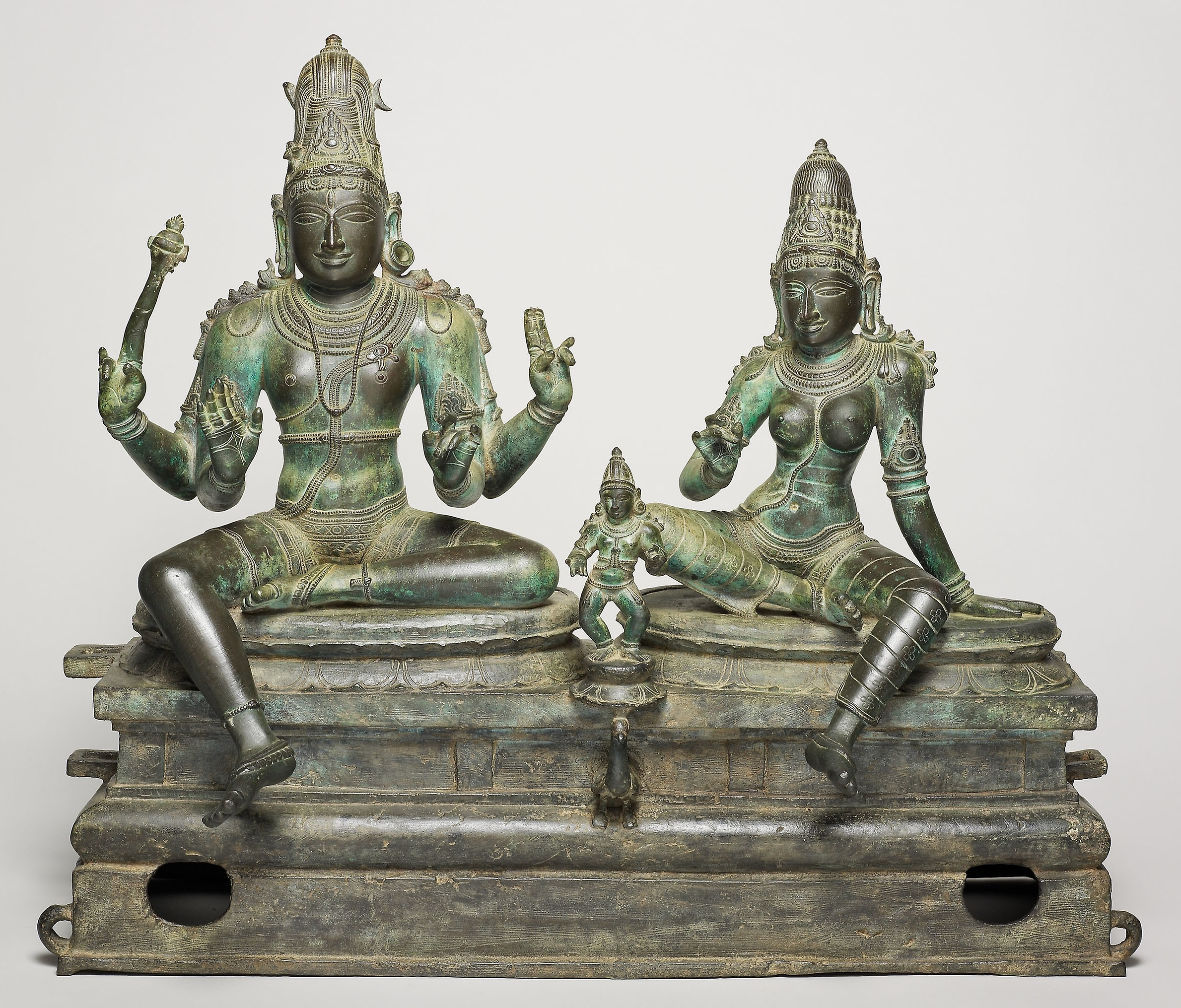
Chola bronze statues of the God Shiva and Goddess Uma Seated with Their Son, Skanda. Dehejia curated an exhibition of Chola bronzes in 2002.

- 1986 From Merchants to Emperors. British Artists and India. 1857–1930. Co-curated with Pratapaditya Pal. With catalogue. Pierpont Morgan Library, New York, and Los Angeles County Museum of Art.
- 1988 “Impossible Picturesqueness.” Edward Lear’s Indian Watercolors. 1873–1875. With catalogue. Wallach Gallery, Columbia University, New York.
- 1998 Sakhi: Friend and Messenger in Rajput Love Paintings. With brochure. Arthur M. Sackler Gallery, Smithsonian Institution, Washington, D.C.
- 1999 Devi: The Great Goddess. With catalogue. Arthur M. Sackler Gallery, Smithsonian Institution, Washington, D.C.
- 2000 India Through the Lens: Photography 1840–1911. With catalogue. Arthur M. Sackler Gallery, Smithsonian Institution, Washington, D.C. Exhibition traveled to Dallas Museum of Art and Cleveland Museum of Art.
- 2002 The Sensuous and the Sacred: Chola Bronzes from South India. With catalogue. American Federation of Arts, New York, jointly with Arthur M. Sackler Gallery, Smithsonian Institution,
- 2006 Chola. Sacred Bronzes of Southern India. With catalogue. London: Royal Academy of Arts. Jointly curated with John Eskanazi.
- 2008 Delight in Design: Indian Silver for the Raj. The Wallach Gallery, Columbia University, New York. With catalogue of the same title published by Mapin Publications, India.
