= Yukio Yashiro =

Japanese academic and art historian

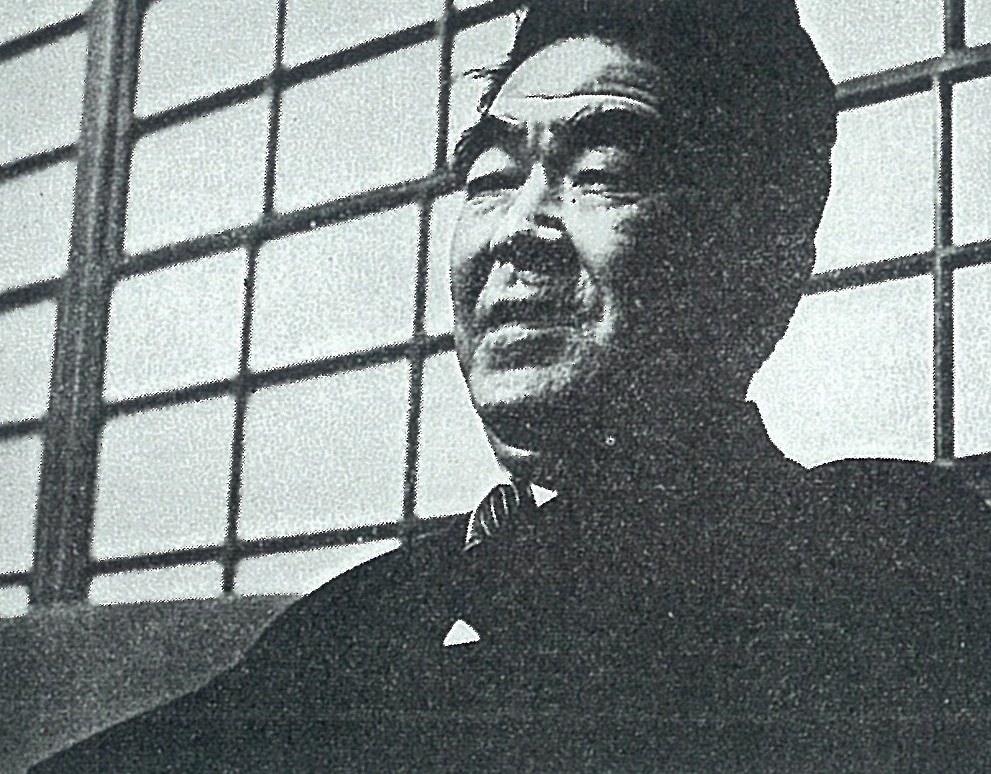
- Yukio Yashiro in 1963
- Born: November 5, 1890; Japan
- Died: May 25, 1975 (aged 84)
- Other name: 矢代 幸雄
- Occupation: art historian
- Relatives: son:Akio Yashiro

Yukio Yashiro (矢代 幸雄, Yashiro Yukio; 5, November 1890–25, May 1975) was a Japanese academic, art historian, Botticelli scholar and Director of the Institute for Art Research in Tokyo.

== Biography ==
In 1960, he became the founding director of the Museum of Japanese Art (Yamato Bunkakan) in Nara, Nara. This museum of Asian art was established to preserve and display the private collection of the Kintetsu Corporation (Kinki Nippon Railway Co., Ltd.).

== Honors ==
- Charles Lang Freer Medal, September 15, 1965.

== Selected works ==
In a statistical overview derived from writings by and about Yukio Yashiro, OCLC/WorldCat encompasses roughly 100+ works in 100+ publications in 7 languages and in 1,000+ library holdings.

The most widely held works by Yashiro include:

- 2000 years of Japanese Art; 5 editions published in 1958 in English and held by 680 libraries worldwide
- Sandro Botticelli and the Florentine Renaissance; 4 editions published in 1929 in English and held by 197 libraries worldwide
- Art treasures of Japan; 1 edition published in 1960 in English and held by 168 libraries worldwide
- Sandro Botticelli; 2 editions published in 1925 in English and held by 138 libraries worldwide
- 日本美術の特質 by 矢代幸雄; 8 editions published between 1943 and 1965 in Japanese and held by 41 libraries worldwide
- The Avery Brundage Collection of Asian Art: M. H. de Young Memorial Museum, San Francisco; 1 edition published in 1966 in English and held by 26 libraries worldwide
- Japanische Kunst; 4 editions published in 1958 in German and held by 22 libraries worldwide
- 水墨画 by 矢代幸雄; 5 editions published between 1969 and 1977 in Japanese and held by 20 libraries worldwide
- 東洋美術論考; 3 editions published in 1942 in Japanese and held by 20 libraries worldwide
- 世界に於ける日本美術の位置; 5 editions published between 1935 and 1988 in Japanese and held by 19 libraries worldwide

== See also ==
- Yamato Bunkakan
