= Tomio Station =

Railway station in Nara, Nara Prefecture, Japan

Tomio Station 富雄駅
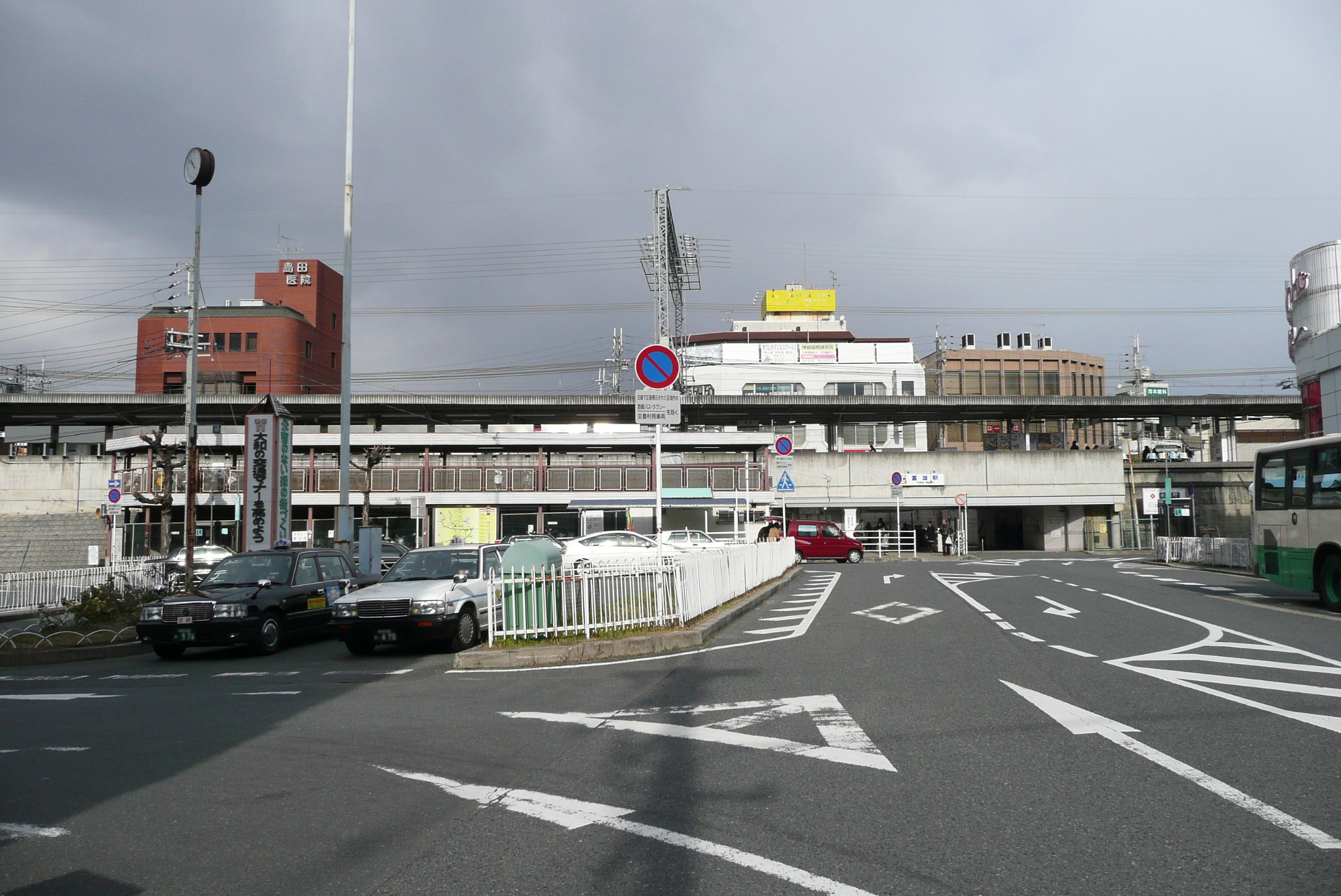
- Tomio Station, January 2008

General information
- Location: 2-3-35, Tomiomotomachi, Nara, Nara （奈良県奈良市富雄元町二丁目3-35） Japan
- Coordinates: 34°41′40″N 135°44′06″E
- System: Kintetsu Railway commuter rail station
- Owner: Kintetsu Railway
- Operator: Kintetsu Railway
- Line: A Kintetsu Nara Line
- Distance: 17.7 km (11.0 miles) from Fuse
- Platforms: 1 island platform
- Tracks: 2
- Train operators: Kintetsu Railway
- Connections: Bus stop

Construction
- Cycle facilities: Available
- Accessible: Yes

Other information
- Station code: A19
- Website: www.kintetsu.co.jp/station/station_info/station03018.html

History
- Opened: 30 April 1914
- Former names: Tomio (1914 - 1941); Tobinomura (1941 - 1953) (until 1953)

Passengers
- November 13, 2022: 24,863 daily

Services
Preceding station	Kintetsu Railway	Following station
Higashi-Ikoma towards Ōsaka Uehommachi	Nara Line Local Suburban Semi-Express	Gakuen-mae towards Kintetsu Nara
Location

Tomio Station (富雄駅, Tomio-eki) is a passenger railway station located in the city of Nara, Nara Prefecture, Japan. It is operated by the private transportation company, Kintetsu Railway.

== Line ==
Tomio Station is served by the Nara Line and is 17.7 kilometers from the starting point of the line at Fuse and 23.8 kilometers from Osaka Namba.

== Layout ==
The station has one elevated island platform and two tracks. There are ticket gates on the first floor on both the east and west sides. There are also two ticket gates at the east exit. The station is staffed.

== Platforms ==
1	■ A Nara Line	for Gakuen-mae, Yamato-Saidaiji, Nara, Tenri and Kyoto
2	■ A Nara Line	for Ikoma, Fuse, Osaka Namba and Amagasaki

== History ==
Tomio Station was opened 30 April 1914 by the Osaka Electric Tramway, which was renamed the Kansai Kyuko Railway Co. (Kankyu) in 1941. The station was renamed Tobinomura Station (鵄邑駅, Tobinomura-eki) in September 1941. Kankyu merged with Nankai Railway in 1944, becoming the Kinki Nippon Railway Co, and the station was renamed to its present name on 1 April 1953.

== Passenger statistics ==
In fiscal 2022, the station was used by an average of 24,863 passengers daily (boarding passengers only).

== Surrounding area ==
The station is located along the Tomio River, a part of the Yamato River system, and Nara Prefectural Highway No. 7 Hirakata-Yamatokoriyama Line. The area from the east side of the station to the neighboring Gakuenmae Station is a residential area. On the south side of the station is a shopping street.

== See also ==
- List of railway stations in Japan
