= Artibus Asiae =

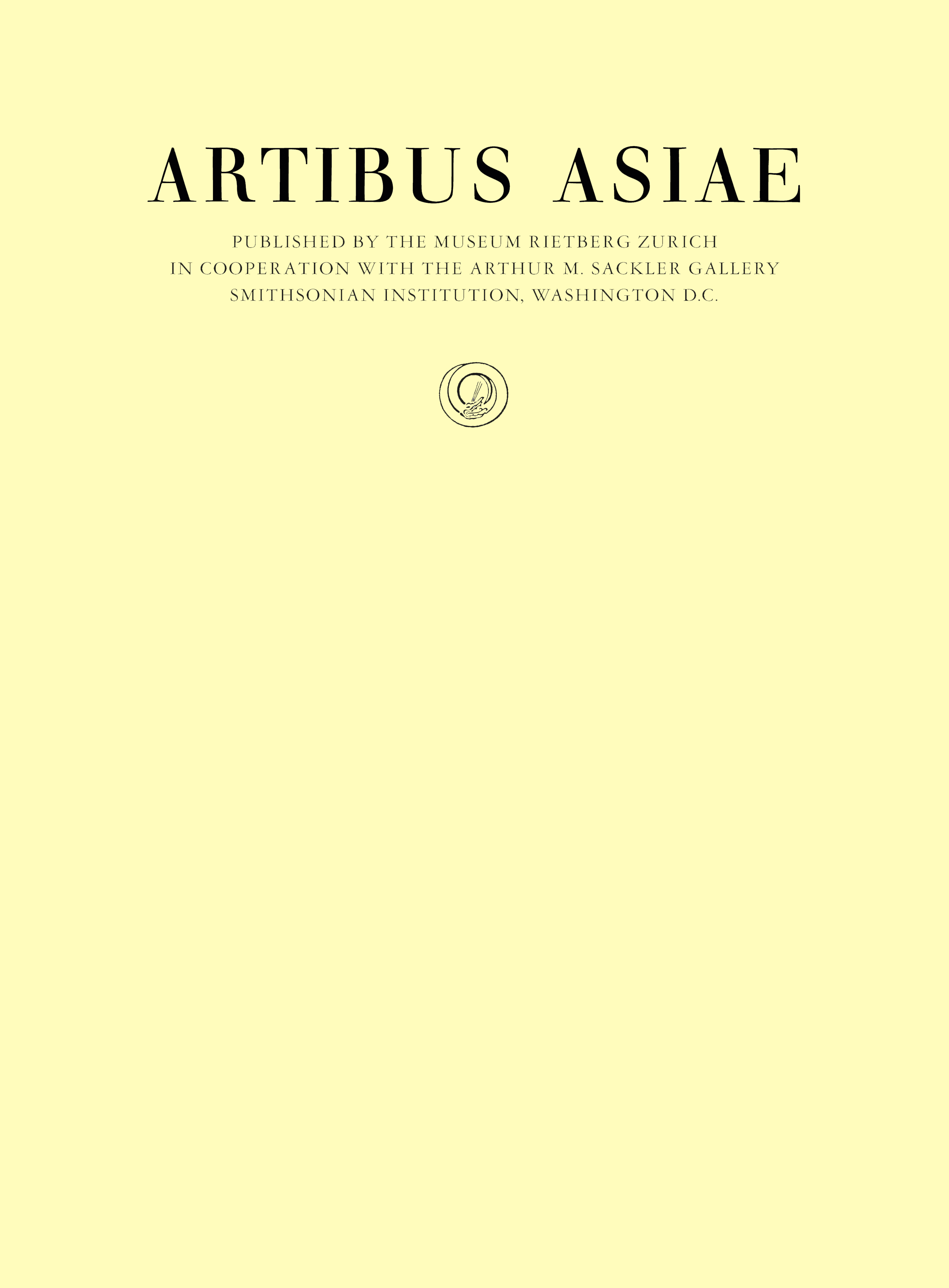
- Discipline: Art, archeology
- Language: English
- Edited by: Amy McNair

Publication details
- History: 1925–present
- Publisher: Museum Rietberg (Switzerland)
- Frequency: Biannual
- Open access: Delayed (after 5 years)

Standard abbreviations
- ISO 4: Artibus Asiae

Indexing
- ISSN: 0004-3648
- JSTOR: 00043648
- OCLC no.: 61966661

Links
- Journal homepage

Artibus Asiae is a biannual academic journal specialising in the arts and archaeology of Asia. Along with the Ostasiatische Zeitschrift (founded in 1912) it was one of the most successful journals in its field in the German-speaking part of Europe. The first number of Artibus Asiae appeared in 1925. While earlier issues contained articles in German, French and English, today's contributions are mainly in English. Artibus Asiae is owned and published by the Museum Rietberg in Zurich. Artibus Asiae also published occasional monographs since 1937.

== History ==
The first volume of the journal was published by the Avalun-Verlag Hellerau-Dresden in 1925 and was edited by Carl Hentze (1883–1975) and Alfred Salmony (1890–1958). The early volumes appeared in four issues each, up to vol. 59. All subsequent volumes were published in two parts.

The typographer, publisher and later editor-in-chief Richard Hadl (1876–1944) had worked for the Leipzig-based publisher Drugulin as a director since 1922. Drugulin was one of the leading publishing houses and known for their wide array of unusual typesets. Hadl established his own publishing house, "Offizin Richard Hadl", in 1926. and published five volumes of the journal Artibus Asiae.

During the Second World War all publishing activities were moved to Switzerland and the journal would only appear irregularly. Vol. 8 no. 1 was the first issue to be published in Switzerland, printed by the Kommissionsverlag Braus Riggenbach in Basel. All further volumes were published by Artibus Asiae in Ascona, where Hadl and his co-worker and publisher, Luise C. Tarabori-Flesch from Trier had settled in 1938/39. After Hadl had died in 1944, Miss Flesch kept the journal afloat on her own until 1946, when Alfred Salmony became editor-in-chief. Salmony edited the journal until his death in 1958.

Artibus Asiae's link to the current owner, the Museum Rietberg, was established through the museums's former director Elsy Leuzinger, who edited an issue (vol. 20 no. 1, 1957) to commemorate the founding donor of the Museum Rietberg, Eduard von der Heydt. In 1985 (from vol. 46 on), the Arthur M. Sackler Foundation started to sponsor the journal. The Museum Rietberg was granted a special publication endowment in 1991 (vol. 51) and it henceforth became the owner of both the journal and the monograph series.

== Editors ==
The following persons have served as editors-in-chief of Artibus Asiae:

Name	Place	Volumes	Years
Carl Hentze & Alfred Salmony	Antwerp and Cologne	vol. 1–vol. 4 no. 3	1925–1932
Richard Hadl	Leipzig and Ascona	vol. 4 no. 4–vol. 8	1925–1945
Alfred Salmony	Institute of Fine Arts, New York University	vols. 9–20	1945–1957
Alexander Soper	Institute of Fine Arts, New York University	vols. 21–52	1958–1992
Thomas Lawton	Arthur M. Sackler Gallery, Washington D.C.	vols. 53–61	1993–2001
François Louis	Bard Graduate Center, New York	vol. 62–vol. 68 no. 1	2002–2008
Amy McNair	University of Kansas	vol. 68 no. 2–present	2008–present

== Artibus Asiae monographs ==
Longer articles submitted to Artibus Asiae were often split into parts and published in several numbers of the journal. Artibus Asiae started to publish monographs on selected topics in 1937 to allow more lengthy contributions to the field. They are conceived as a supplemental series to the journal and present a broad range of lavishly illustrated studies. Early monographs were on topics only remotely related to the arts, such as publications on the Tibetan grammar books Sum cu pa and Rtags kyi ‘ajug or on Chinese literature.
