= Tezukayama University =

Private university in Nara, Japan

- 帝塚山大学
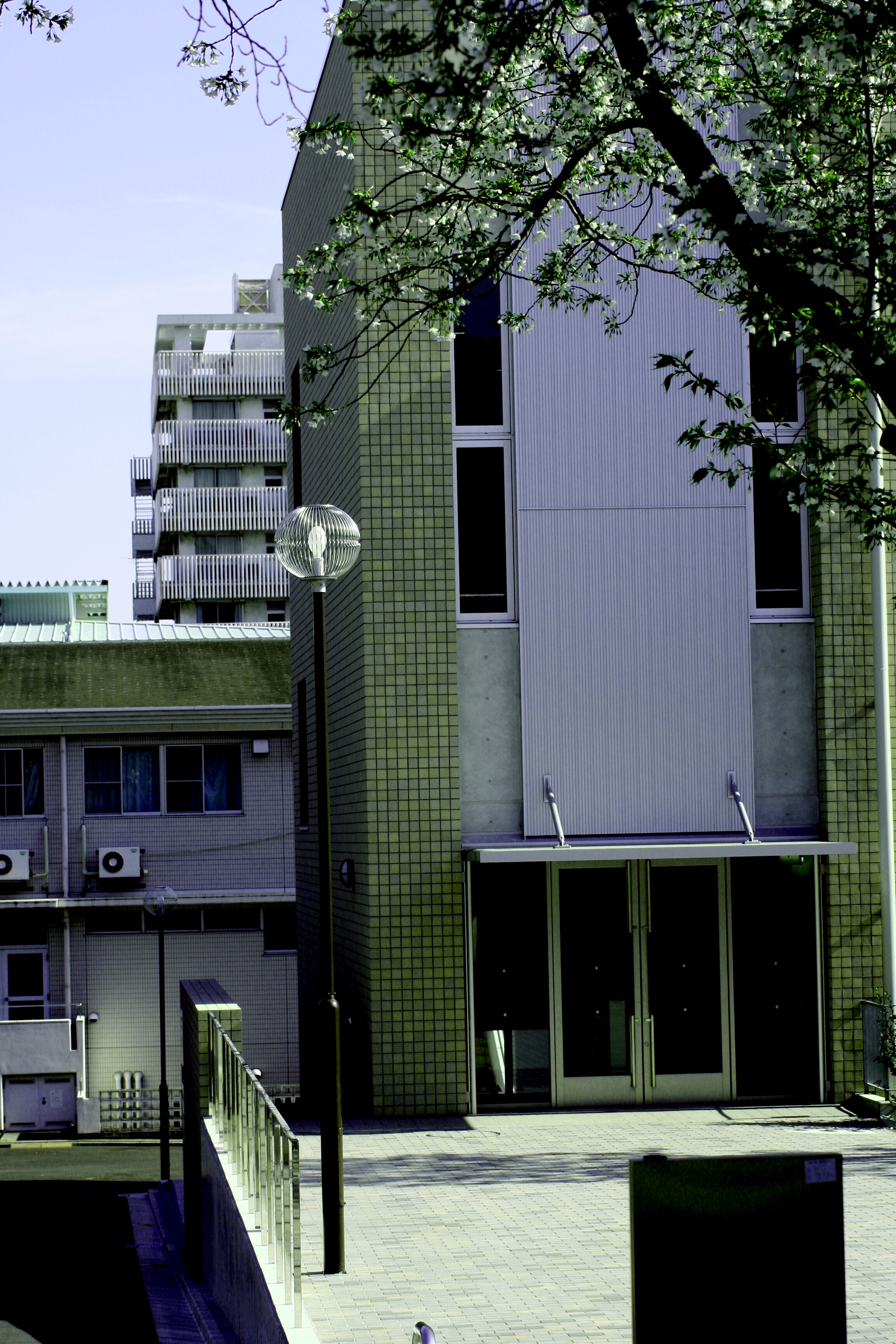
- Type: Private
- Established: 1941
- President: Hiroshi Iwai (岩井洋)
- Faculty: 143 full-time 313 part-time
- Administrative staff: 665
- Students: 4,609
- Undergraduates: 4,530
- Postgraduates: 79
- Doctoral students: 20
- Other students: 484 (international)
- Location: Nara, Nara, Japan; 34°41′11″N 135°43′20″E
- Campus: Urban
- Colors: Blue
- Website: http://www.tezukayama-u.ac.jp/

Tezukayama University (帝塚山大学, Tezukayama Daigaku) is a private university in Nara, Japan. Tezukayama University has two campuses—one in Gakuen-mae (学園前) in Nara city, and the other in eastern Ikoma (東生駒). Tezukayama University has many facilities in a historical setting.

== History ==
Tezukayama Gakuen was founded with an ideal of creating a new college town in Nara in celebration of Osaka's Tezukayama Gakuin 25th anniversary in 1941.

In 1961, Tezukayama Women's Junior College was established with two departments, the Department of Arts and Literature and the Department of Family and Consumer Science. In 1964, Tezukayama University was established as a woman's college with the Faculty of Liberal Arts. In 1982, the Tezukayama Archaeological Research Institute was founded (from 1997, reorganized as Research Institute for Archaeology).

Tezukayama University was changed to co-education in 1987 with establishing a more faculty, the Faculty of Economics. In 1991, the Graduate School of Economics was established, and in 1993, the doctoral degree program in Economics was established. After that, other faculties and graduate schools were established, such as the Graduate School of Humanities in 1996.

The Graduate School of Humanities at Tezukayama University is notable in the studies of Traditional Japanese Culture. Both M.A. and Ph.D. degrees are offered by this program. The Ph.D. programs in Law and Policy and Psychology were launched in 2003 and 2012, respectively.

== Women's junior college ==
Tezukayama College
- 帝塚山大学短期大学部
- Type: Private women's junior college
- Active: 1961–2005
- Location: Nara, Japan

Tezukayama University Junior College (帝塚山大学短期大学部, Tezukayama Daigaku Tanki Daigakubu) was a private junior college associated with Tezukayama University. The junior college opened in April 1961 by Tezukayama Gakuen Education Group as a women's college. The junior college was affiliated with Tezukayama University from 1964 to 2005. It closed in 2005.

== Organization ==
=== Colleges ===
- Humanities
  - Department of Japanese Cultural Studies
  - Department of English Communication
- Economics
  - Department of Economics
- Business Administration
  - Department of Business Administration
- Law
  - Department of Law
- Psychology
  - Department of Psychology
  - Department of Family and Community Welfare
- Contemporary Human Life Science
  - Department of Food and Nutrition
  - Department of Living Space Design
  - Department of Child Studies

=== Graduate school ===
- Humanities
  - Traditional Japanese Culture (Doctoral Program)
- Economics
  - Economics (Doctoral Program)
- Law and Policy
  - Law and Policy (Doctoral Program)
- Psychology
  - Psychology (Doctoral Program)

=== Research institutes ===
- Research Institute for Archeology
- Research Institute for Economics and Business
- Institute of Comprehensive Nara Cultural Studies
- Human Environmental Science Research Institute

=== Other institutes ===
- Institute for Mental Support
- The Museum of Tezukayama University

== Notable faculty members ==
- Ryoyu Uchiyama (Theoretical physics)
- Kazuo Fujita (Earth Scientice)
- Michio Hatanaka (Econometrics)
- Chikashi Moriguchi (Economics)
- Takashi Inukai (Japanese literature)

== List of partner universities ==
=== China ===
- Beijing Language and Culture University
- Shanghai Normal University

=== New Zealand ===
- Christchurch Polytechnic Institute of Technology

=== South Korea ===
- Dongseo University
- Kyungnam College of Information and Technology

=== Spain ===
- Universidad de Valladolid

=== United Kingdom ===
- University of Leeds

=== United States ===
- The University of Maine
- University of Mount Union
- Guilford College
- Manhattanville College
- Portland State University
