= Laurence Sickman =

American art historian

Laurence Chalfant Stevens Sickman (1907–1988) was an American academic, art historian, sinologist and Director of the Nelson-Atkins Museum of Art in Kansas City.

== Education ==
A native of Denver, Colorado, Sickman became interested in Japanese and Chinese art while in high school. In 1930, he earned a degree in the field at Harvard, where he also became fluent in Chinese. He traveled throughout China under the newly formed Harvard-Yenching Fellowship, purchasing Chinese paintings, sculpture and furniture for collection and study at the William Rockhill Nelson Gallery of the Nelson-Atkins Museum. He traveled on a scholarship to China, where he met Langdon Warner, his former Harvard professor and one of the trustees of the Nelson museum, which was being established. Warner, who had been appointed to build a collection for the museum, initially tutored Sickman. Sickman was later given the responsibility of buying works on his own by means of a $11 million donation by Kansas City Star founder William Rockhill Nelson.

== Career ==
In 1931, Sickman joined the staff of the Nelson-Atkins Museum of Art. In 1935, he became the curator of Oriental Art at the museum. His museum curatorial career was interrupted by military service in the Second World War.

=== Honors ===
In 1973, Sickman was awarded the Charles Lang Freer Medal.

== World War II ==
Sickman's war service took him to Tokyo during the occupation of Japan where he served as one of the "Monuments Men" under General Douglas MacArthur's Monuments, Fine Arts, and Archives (MFAA) section. Among those serving with Sickman in Tokyo were Sherman Lee and Patrick Lennox Tierney.

== Curatorship after World War II ==
At war's end, he returned to the Nelson-Atkins museum, where he was director from 1953 through 1977.

== Selected works ==
In a statistical overview derived from writings by and about Laurence Sickman, OCLC/WorldCat encompasses roughly 50+ works in 90+ publications in four languages and in 3,000+ library holdings.

- 1956 – The Art and Architecture of China (with Alexander Coburn Soper). Baltimore, Maryland: Penguin Books. OCLC 192176467

== See also ==
- Roberts Commission
- Monuments, Fine Arts, and Archives program
- Monuments Men Foundation for the Preservation of Art
