= Patrick Lennox Tierney =

American art historian

Patrick Lennox Tierney (January 28, 1914 – June 12, 2015) was an American Japanologist academic in the field of art history, an emeritus professor of the University of Utah, a former Curator of Japanese Art at the Utah Museum of Fine Arts, a former director of the Pacific Asia Museum, and a former commissioner of art and monuments during the Allied occupation of Japan (1945–1952).

In the fall of 2007, the Japanese government acknowledged Tierney's life's work by conferring the Order of the Rising Sun, Gold Rays with Neck Ribbon, which represents the third highest of eight classes associated with this award. Accompanying the badge of the Order was a certificate explaining the award as recognition of the extent to which Tierney has "contributed to introducing Japanese fine arts." The efforts of a lifetime have assisted in the propagation of better understanding of traditional Japanese culture in the United States. His visits to Japan every year have cumulatively contributed to exchanges in the art field between the United States and Japan. He turned 100 in January 2014, and died in 2015 at the age of 101.

== Education and academic life ==
Tierney earned an undergraduate degree in Japanese Art at the University of California, Los Angeles; and he was awarded a Master of Arts degree from Columbia University. He became a Professor in the Art Department at Pasadena City College. Later, he taught at the University of Utah.

== Commissioner of Art and Monuments ==
As Representative Commissioner of Art and Monuments for General Headquarters during the Allied Occupation of Japan, Tierney was responsible for organizing and overseeing the repair and preservation of cultural sites, art, and monuments bombed and destroyed in Japan during the Pacific War. General Douglas MacArthur's staff during the occupation of Japan included a Monuments, Fine Arts, and Archives (MFAA) section. Among those serving with Tierney in Tokyo were Sherman Lee and Laurence Sickman.

After the end of his military service, Tierney stayed in Japan. In addition to engaging in research on Japanese art, he guided American schools in the study of art, which helped promote better understanding of Japanese history and culture amongst American children residing in Japan. In the years which followed the war, Tierney found himself disagreeing with the conventional assessment that MacArthur should be construed as an expert in Japanese culture. Based on his experiences working with MacArthur, Tierney would many years later assess MacArthur as culturally insensitive.

=== Insults ===
As a staff officer working for the Supreme Commander of the Allied Powers (SCAP), Gen. Douglas MacArthur, his was a somewhat unusual perspective on the occupation of Japan and on the events which unfolded in SCAP headquarters. His office was on the fifth floor of the Dai-Ichi Insurance Building in Tokyo, the same floor where MacArthur's suite of offices was located. He was there on the day the emperor came by; but when the emperor arrived, MacArthur refused to admit him or acknowledge him. Many years later, Tierney made an effort to explain his understanding of the significance of what he had personally witnessed: "Apology is a very important thing in Japan. With us, we don't apologize unless we get caught with our hand in the cookie jar, but for the Japanese, there is a very strong sense of what an apology means." According to historian Herbert Bix in Hirohito and the Making of Modern Japan, "MacArthur's truly extraordinary measures to save Hirohito from trial as a war criminal had a lasting and profoundly distorting impact on Japanese understanding of the lost war."

== Japanese art ==
Across the span of decades, Tierney delved deeply into Japanese art. The University of Utah's Marriott Library today holds close to 75,000 photographs taken by Tierney—all related to the art and architecture of the Far East, Southeast Asia, and especially Japan. He has also donated close to 1500 books related to Japanese art history and Japanese art to the Clark Center for Japanese Art and Culture. This gesture was consistent with a lifetime of contributions towards the development of understanding amongst students and United States citizens towards Japanese art. As one of the pioneers in California engaged in the study of Japanese art, Professor Tierney's achievements in the propagation of Japanese art are notable.

=== Japanese garden ===
Tierney was a member of the San Diego Japanese Garden Reconstruction Committee, and served on the Board of Directors of Japanese Friendship Garden at San Diego. His participation contributed to the preservation and maintenance of the garden. His involvement helped introduce the beauty of the Japanese garden to those who visit the Japanese Friendship Garden at San Diego's Balboa Park. As of 2008 he continued to teach Ikebana at the Osher Lifelong Learning Institute in Bountiful, Utah (Spring 2008).

=== Selected works ===
- Tierney, Lennox. (1975). "Chanoyu as a Form of Non-Literary Art Criticism," Chanoyu Quarterly, No. 11, pp. 12–16.
- _______________. (1962). "Double Image Slide Projection Technique," Art Education, Vol. 15, No. 8, pp. 17–28.
- _______________. (1945) Japan. Tokyo: International Communications Foundation, ASIN: B000SN9RXA [reprinted 1961, ASIN: B0007E4CIK
- _______________. (1999). Wabi Sabi: A New Look at Japanese Design. Layton, Utah: Gibbs Smith Publishers. ISBN 978-0-87905-849-4 (cloth)

=== Honors ===
- 2007 -- Order of the Rising Sun, Gold Rays with Neck Ribbon.
- 2006 -- Reischauer International Education Award, Japan Society of San Diego and Tijuana (JSSDT)
- 2013 --Monuments men Robert Edsel monument men foundation http://www.monumentsmenfoundation.org/the-heroes/the-monuments-men/patrick-lennox-tierney

== See also ==
- Monuments, Fine Arts, and Archives program
