= Piling School =

Example of a Piling painting from the Nantoyōsō Collection, Japan

The Piling School (毗陵畫派), also called Changzhou School (常州畫派), was a genre of Chinese painting, named for its place of origin, now Changzhou in Jiangsu province. The style was influenced by contact with Japan, and examples are found almost exclusively in Japan and particularly in collections associated with the great Japanese Buddhist monasteries.

== Origin ==
Such paintings and associated art works are a reflection of the vigorous medieval overseas trade between China and Japan.

Piling (Chinese: 毘陵/毗陵; pinyin: pílíng) itself was a part of Changzhou close to Lake Tai in Jiangsu Province. Many other genre artists can be associated with this general area. Although their surviving works are few, the clear influence of their painting can be readily seen in shards of Yuan period blue-and-white porcelain from the Jingdezhen production area.

== Categorization ==
Works of the Piling School may be rightly regarded as folk or popular works that have no association with named artists. An exception are the hanging scrolls in the Chion-in collection in Kyoto that bear seals designating the “Lotuses and Birds” compositions as done by a “Mr. Yu from Piling.” Mr. Yu is elsewhere identified as a Yu Ziming, active in the late 13th century. Yu was clearly a master of a local tradition of genre painting that specialized in plants, flowers, birds, insects and other genre subjects.

== Manners ==
A manner of painting in this school of painting was the mogu (沒骨) or “boneless” style which eschewed clear outlines in ink for washes in color or monochrome ink itself.

== Examples in exhibitions ==
The "Egrets and Lotuses" scrolls now in the Tokyo National Museum are typical of works closer to the year 1300. They display a trend toward pattern and professional artisanship, away from the creativity that originally characterized the school.

The "Birds and Lotuses" scroll reproduced with this article can be easily seen as another example of this period work with its exclusive ink wash and stylized positioning of the birds.

The earlier scrolls in the Chion-in Monastery however are examples of works displaying a greater animation and with their use of color a greater sensuous appeal.
