= Museum Yamato Bunkakan =

Museum in Nara, Nara Prefecture, Japan

Coordinates: 34°41′43″N 135°45′24″E

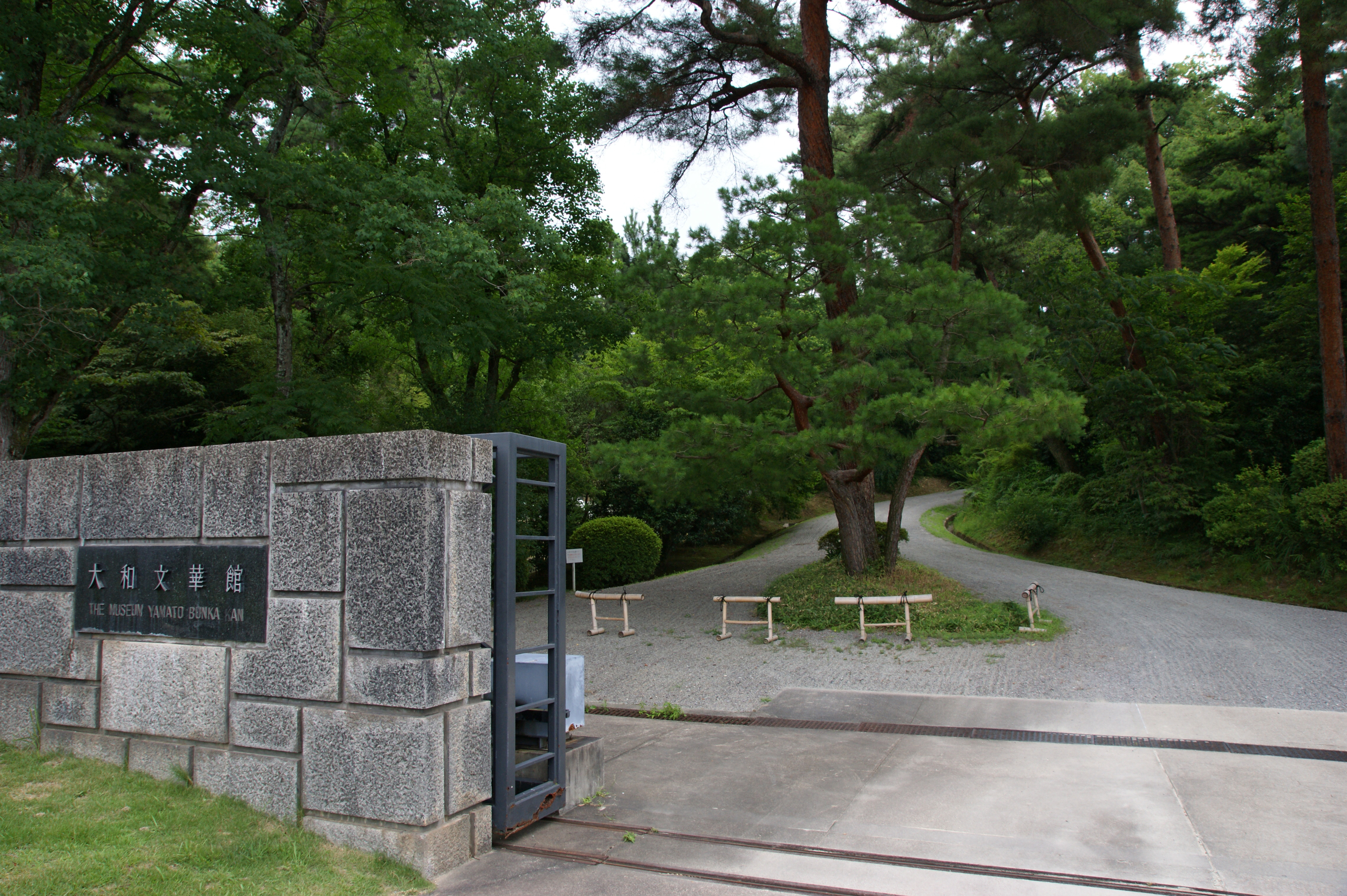
The entrance to the Museum Yamato Bunkakan

The Museum of Japanese Art Yamato Bunkakan (大和文華館, Yamato bunkakan) is a museum of Asian art in Nara, Nara.

The museum was established in 1960 to preserve and display the private collection of Kintetsu Corporation (named Kinki Nippon Railway Co., Ltd. till June 27, 2003).

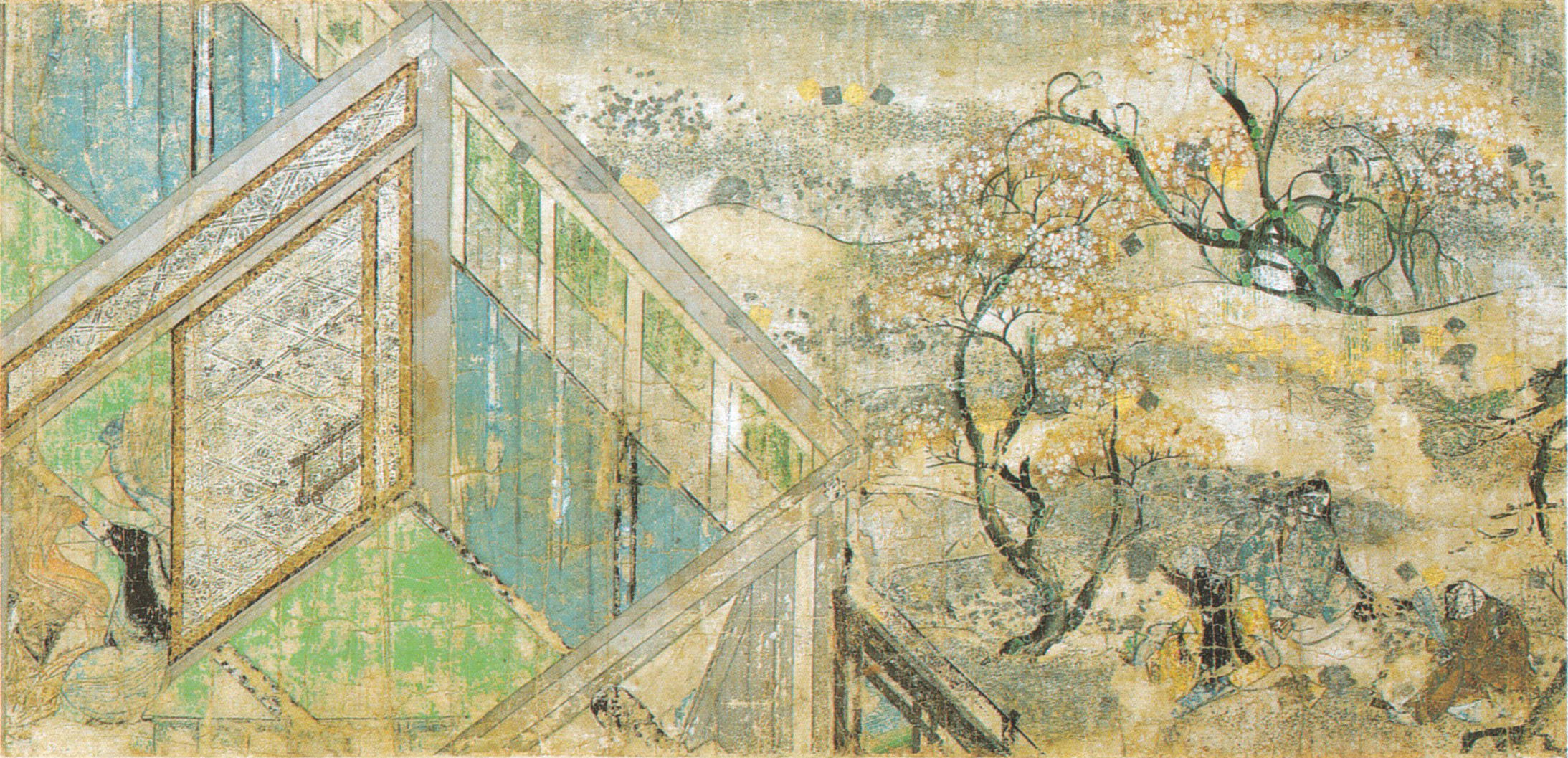
A house, trees with white blossoms and people.

== Collection ==
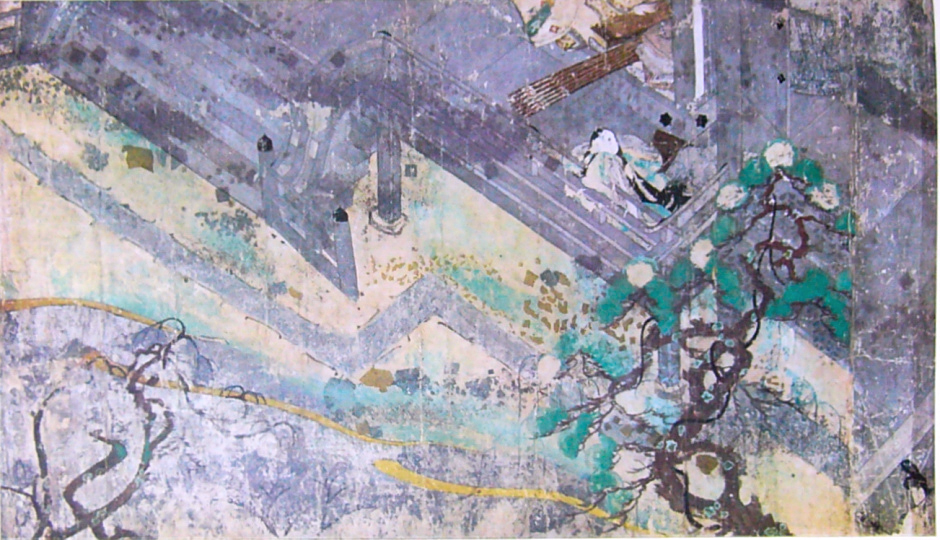
Part of a house and garden.

This museum of Asian art has holdings of more than twenty thousand objects of sculpture, ceramics, lacquer, paintings, prints, textiles and calligraphy. The museum features a program of regularly changing exhibitions. The founding director in 1960 was art historian Yukio Yashiro.

=== National treasures ===
Two national treasures in the collection are illustrative scenes from Nezame Monogatari Emaki (紙本著色寝覚物語絵巻, shihon choshoku nezame monogatari emaki).

== See also ==
- List of National Treasures of Japan (paintings)
- Chinese Piling paintings
