= Sherman Lee =

Sherman E. Lee
- Born: Sherman Emery Lee; April 19, 1918; Seattle, Washington
- Died: July 9, 2008; Chapel Hill, North Carolina
- Education: B.A. and M.A., American University; PhD at Western Reserve University, 1941
- Occupations: Art historian, curator, and expert on Asian art
- Employer(s): Detroit Institute of Arts, Seattle Art Museum, University of Washington, Cleveland Museum of Art
- Known for: Director of the Cleveland Museum of Art, 1958-1983

Sherman Emery Lee (April 19, 1918 – July 9, 2008) was an American academic, writer, art historian and expert on Asian art. He was Director of the Cleveland Museum of Art from 1958 to 1983.

Lee earned his B.A. and M.A. at American University in Washington, D.C. He was awarded his PhD at Western Reserve University in 1941.

Lee was "a renowned expert on Asian art." According to Philippe de Montebello, Lee will be remembered for "sensational acquisitions that transformed the Cleveland Museum of Art in all fields."

== Career ==
In 1941, Lee was named Curator of Far Eastern Art at the Detroit Institute of Arts. His museum career was interrupted by military service in World War II.

He returned to the United States in 1948. He was the associate director of the Seattle Art Museum and he taught at the University of Washington.

In 1952, Lee began work at the Cleveland Museum of Art as Chief Curator of Oriental Art. He was named Director in 1958, and served in this capacity until 1983.

He advised Mr. and Mrs. John D. Rockefeller on building their collection of Asian art.

After retiring from the Cleveland Museum of Art in 1983, Lee became an adjunct professor of art history at the University of North Carolina at Chapel Hill.

== World War II ==
Lieutenant Sherman Lee was activated from the United States Naval Reserve during World War II. His naval career took a turn when he was transferred in 1946 to Monuments, Fine Arts, and Archives (MFAA) in Japan. When he was discharged from the military, he continued working as a civilian in Tokyo. From 1946 to 1948, he was a civilian adviser to the staff of Gen. Douglas MacArthur (Supreme Commander of the Allied Powers, also known by the acronym SCAP) on the cataloging, preserving and protection of Japanese artworks. Among those serving with Lee at SCAP headquarters in Tokyo were Patrick Lennox Tierney and Laurence Sickman.

== Quote ==
Speaking of his service with the Monuments Men, Lee said:

We were responsible for protection of registered cultural property ... We were responsible for national parks ... We were responsible for the encouragement of the living artists and ... the democratization of Japanese museums to see that there was evenhanded fair play.

== Legacy ==
According to Philippe de Montebello, director of the Metropolitan Museum of Art in New York, Sherman Lee "carried a lot of weight in the community of museum directors. He bought in all fields, his own particularly brilliantly, but in many different fields. He really transformed the Cleveland museum from a regional museum to a major global museum."

== Honors ==
- Order of the Sacred Treasure, Japan.
- Légion d'honneur, France.
- Charles Lang Freer medal, 1983.

== Selected works ==
In a statistical overview derived from writings by and about Sherman Lee, OCLC/WorldCat encompasses roughly 100+ works in 300+ publications in 8 languages and 14,000+ library holdings.

- Chinese Landscape Painting (1954)
- Japanese Decorative Style (1961)
- A History of Far Eastern Art (1964)
- Ancient Cambodian Sculpture (1969)
- The Colors of Ink: Chinese Paintings and Related Ceramics from the Cleveland Museum of Art (1974)
- The Genius of Japanese Design (1981)
- Reflections of Reality in Japanese Art (1983)
- Past, Present, East and West (1983)

== See also ==
- Roberts Commission
- Nazi Plunder
- Rescuing Da Vinci
- The Rape of Europa
- Monuments Men Foundation for the Preservation of Art
