= Alexander Soper =

American art historian

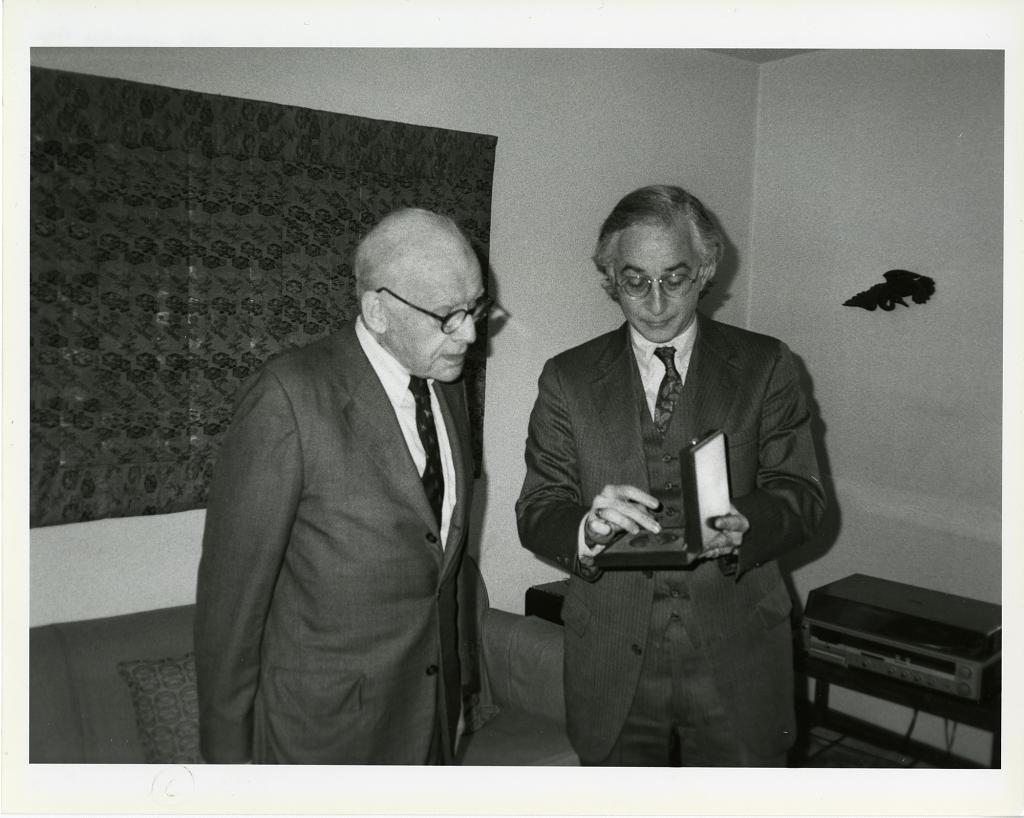
Alexander Soper (left) receiving the Charles Lang Freer Medal from Milo C. Beach, Director of the Freer Gallery of Art, 1990.

Alexander Coburn Soper III (February 18, 1904 – January 13, 1993) was an American art historian who specialized in Asian art. He was a longtime editor of the journal Artibus Asiae and professor at the Institute of Fine Arts of New York University. He won the Charles Lang Freer Medal in 1990.

== Life and career ==
Soper was born in Chicago on February 18, 1904. He graduated from Hamilton College in 1925 with a bachelor's degree, and from Princeton University in 1929 with a master's degree in architecture. He lived in Japan for some time, before returning to Princeton and earning a Ph.D. in art history in 1944. He taught at Bryn Mawr College, and then at the Institute of Fine Arts (IFA) for more than 30 years from 1960. After retiring from full-time teaching in the 1980s, he remained a doctoral adviser at IFA.

Soper served as editor of the academic journal Artibus Asiae from 1958 until his death in 1993. His scholarship covered the breath of Asian art, ranging from Chinese and Japanese architecture to Indian Buddhist sculpture.

In 1990, he became the ninth person to be awarded the Charles Lang Freer Medal by the Smithsonian Institution.

== Personal ==
Soper had a son, John, who lived in New Hampshire, and four grandchildren. He died at his home in Rosemont, Pennsylvania, on January 13, 1993, at the age of 88.
