= Lake Gault =

Small glacial lake in South Westland, New Zealand

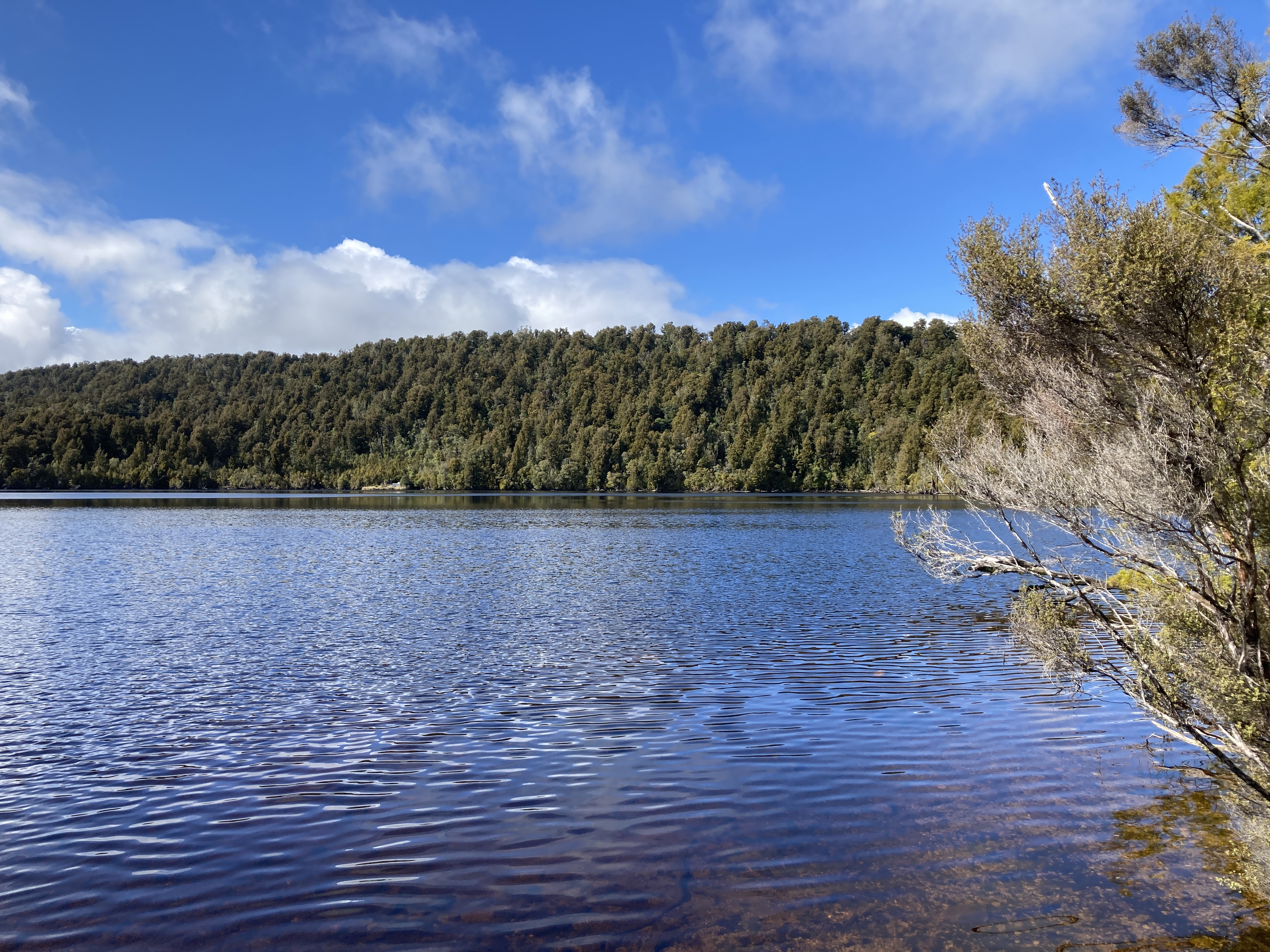
- Lake Gault

- Location within New Zealand
- Interactive map of Lake Gault
- Location: Fox Glacier, West Coast, South Island
- Coordinates: 43°25′49″S 169°59′05″E
- Surface area: 31.8 ha (79 acres)
- Average depth: 14.5 m (48 ft)
- Surface elevation: 333 m (1,093 ft)

Lake Gault is a small glacial lake in South Westland, New Zealand, near the township of Fox Glacier. A walking track from Lake Matheson leads to the lake, which is surrounded by mature native forest. A small hydro-electric power plant was constructed piping water from the lake to power a gold mining dredge at Gillespies Beach. Endangered Ōkārito kiwi (rowi) have been released into the wild around Lake Gault.

== Geography ==
Lake Gault is located at an altitude of 333 m (1,093 ft) in the Omoeroa Range. It has an area of 31.8 ha (79 acres) and an average depth of 14.5 m (48 ft). Its only access is via a 4-kilometre (2.5 mi) walking track that climbs 200 metres (660 ft) from the eastern shore of Lake Matheson. The lake was created by glacial advance and retreat about 16,000 years ago, when moraines were deposited by what is now Fox Glacier in the Okarito Formation.

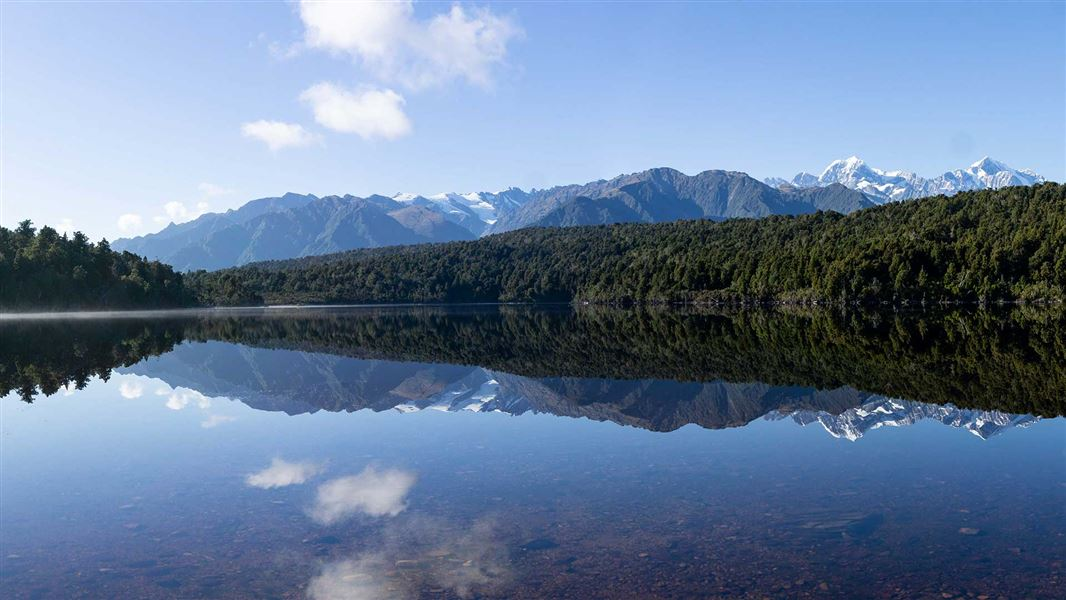
Lake Gault showing reflection

Lake Gault drains into pakihi wetland to the north, part of Skiffington Swamp, which is itself drained to the west by the Waihapi Creek and to the east by the Hauraki Creek, both of which reach the coast of the Tasman Sea between Gillespies Point and the mouth of the Waikūkūpa River.

Like nearby Lake Matheson, Lake Gault is dystrophic: its water is stained brown in colour with tannins leached from surrounding forest, low in nutrients, acidic, and has a sparse and specialised phytoplankton. And as in Lake Matheson the dark water creates spectacular reflected views of the Southern Alps, especially Aoraki / Mount Cook and Mount Tasman.

== History ==
A pipeline takes water from Lake Gault over the ridgeline to a small hydroelectric power station on the Cook River flats. Built in the 1930s, the station powered a gold-mining dredge that worked the sands of Gillespies Beach 15 km to the west through to the 1940s. In 1958 an earth dam was constructed between Lake Gault and Skiffington Swamp to the north to raise the lake level: by this time the hydroelectric plant was powering the village of Fox Glacier.

== Lake Gault Track ==
A track over the ridgeline was cut in the 1930s to enable servicing of the power station intake at Lake Gault, but it gradually fell into disrepair. After being abandoned for 20 years, it was reopened in April 2019 in a year-long collaboration between the Fox Glacier community and the Department of Conservation. Repairing the overgrown track to "tramping" grade took more than a year, with volunteers carrying out most of the work.

When the northern access road to the Fox Glacier was destroyed by a landslide in February 2019, the government announced a $3.9 million package to offset the loss to tourism by enhancing or upgrading other attractions in the area. One of those selected was the Lake Gault Track. What had been a muddy and challenging 3–5 hour return hike was fully drained and gravelled to an "easy" grade by late 2020. A lookout point and bench at the lakeside allows views of the mountains, though these are best seen early in the morning of a calm, clear day.

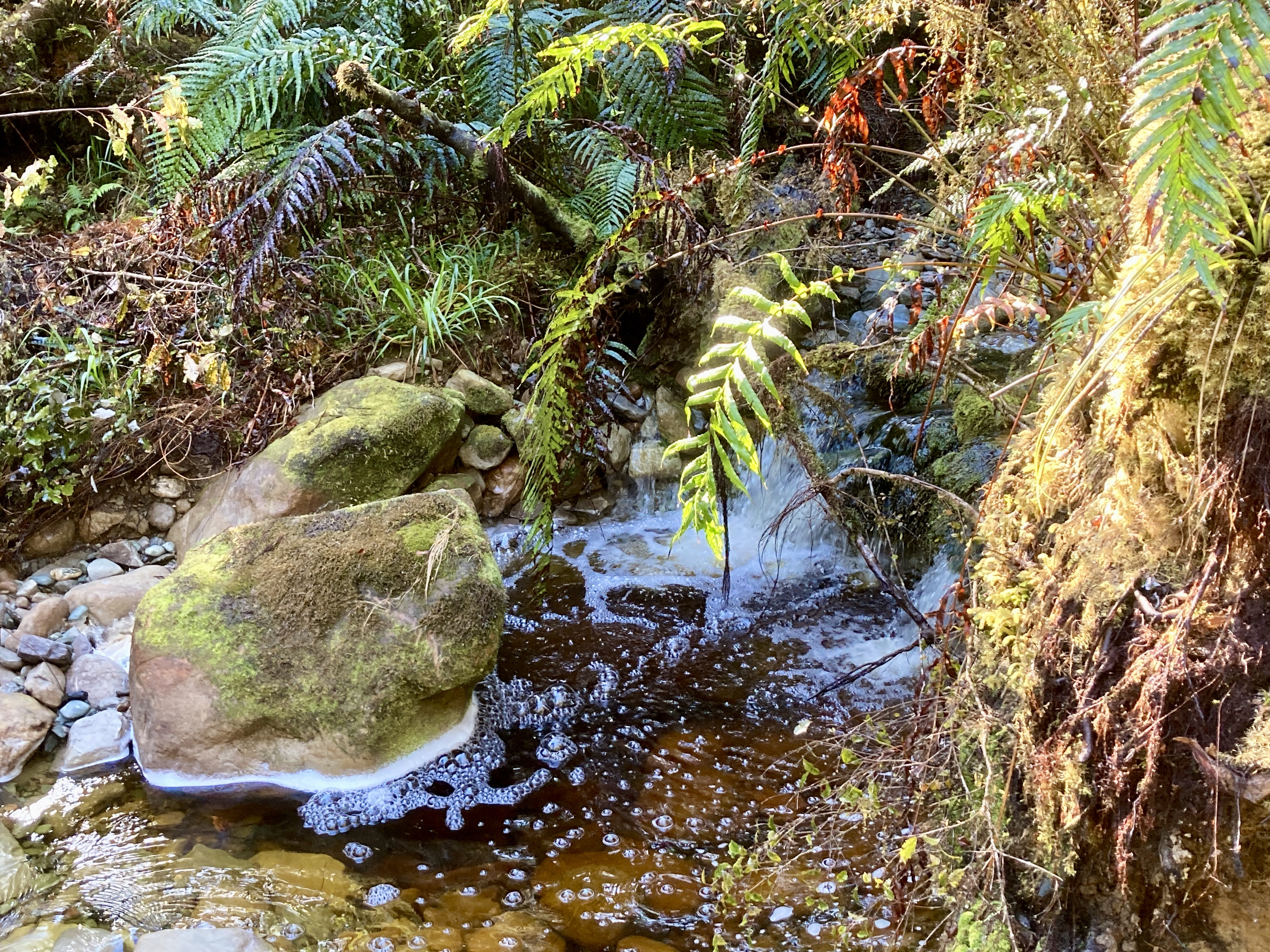

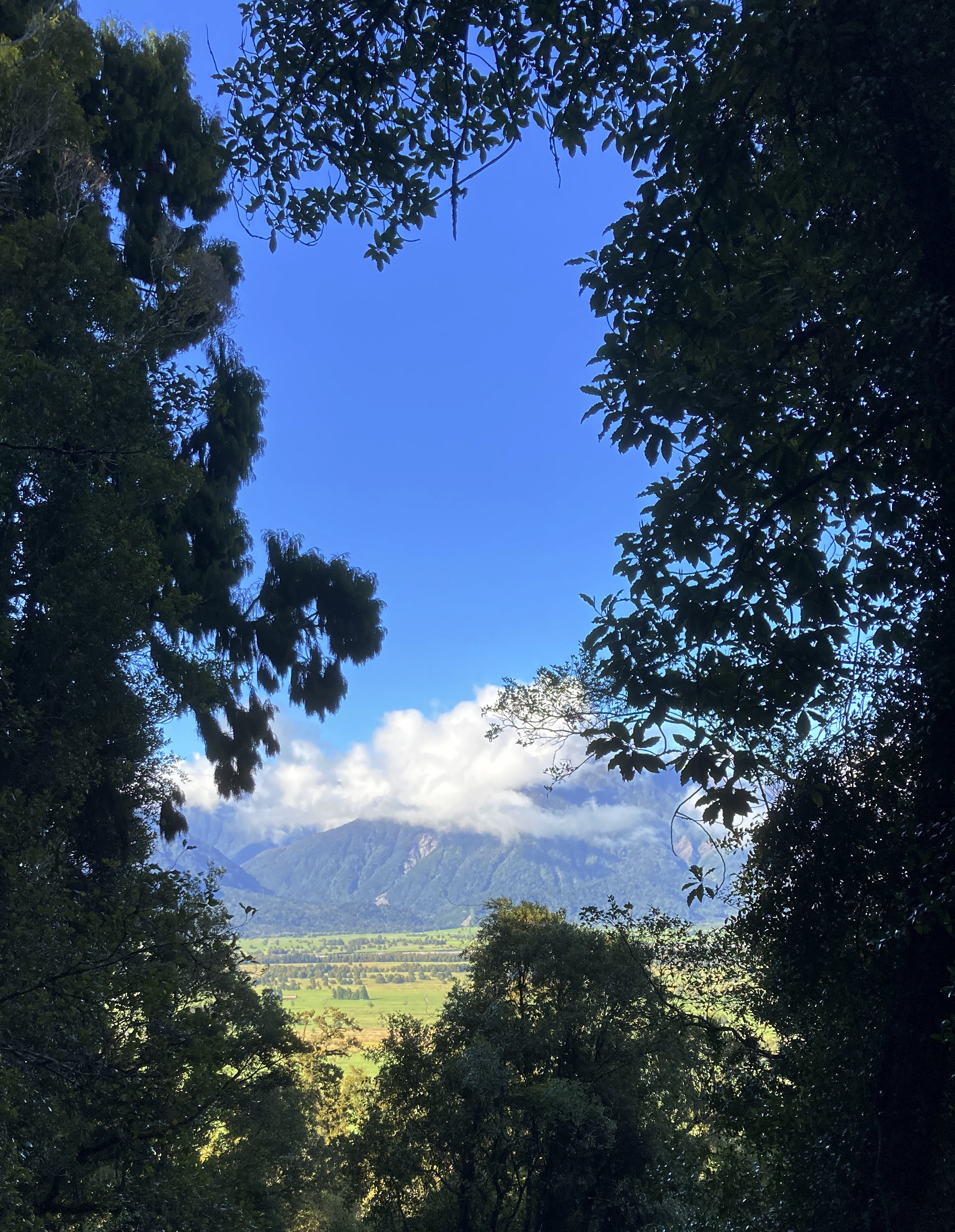

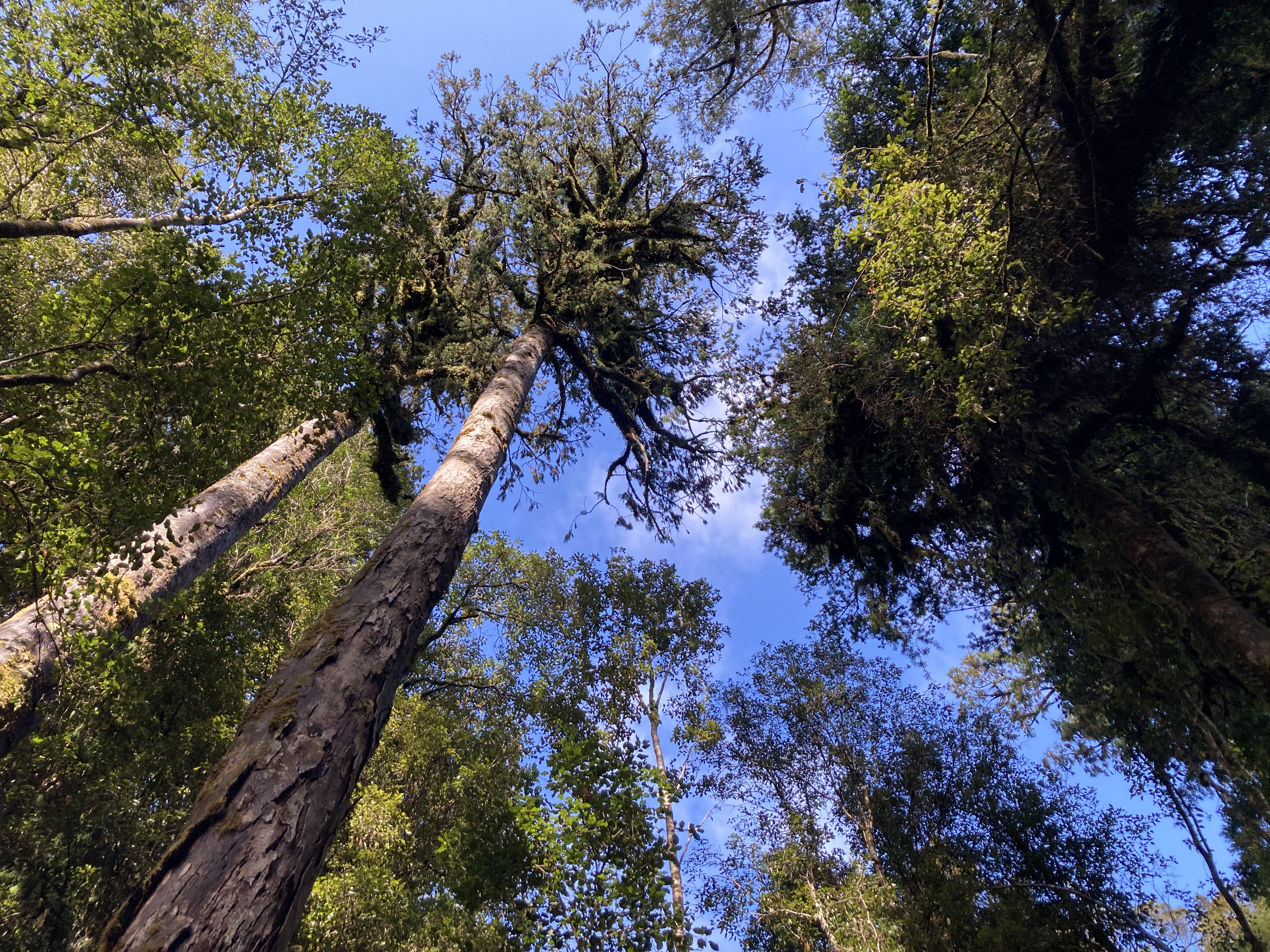

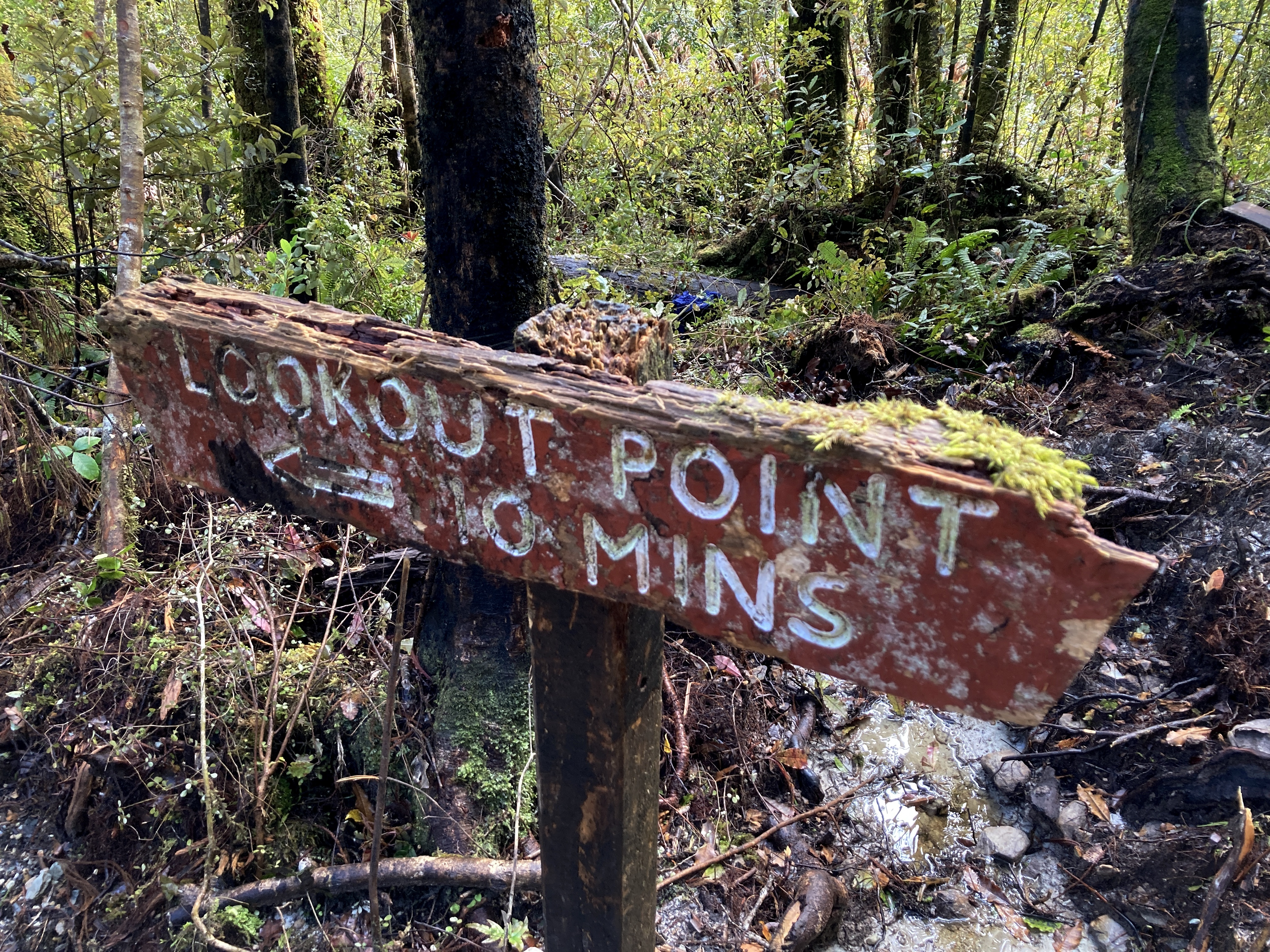

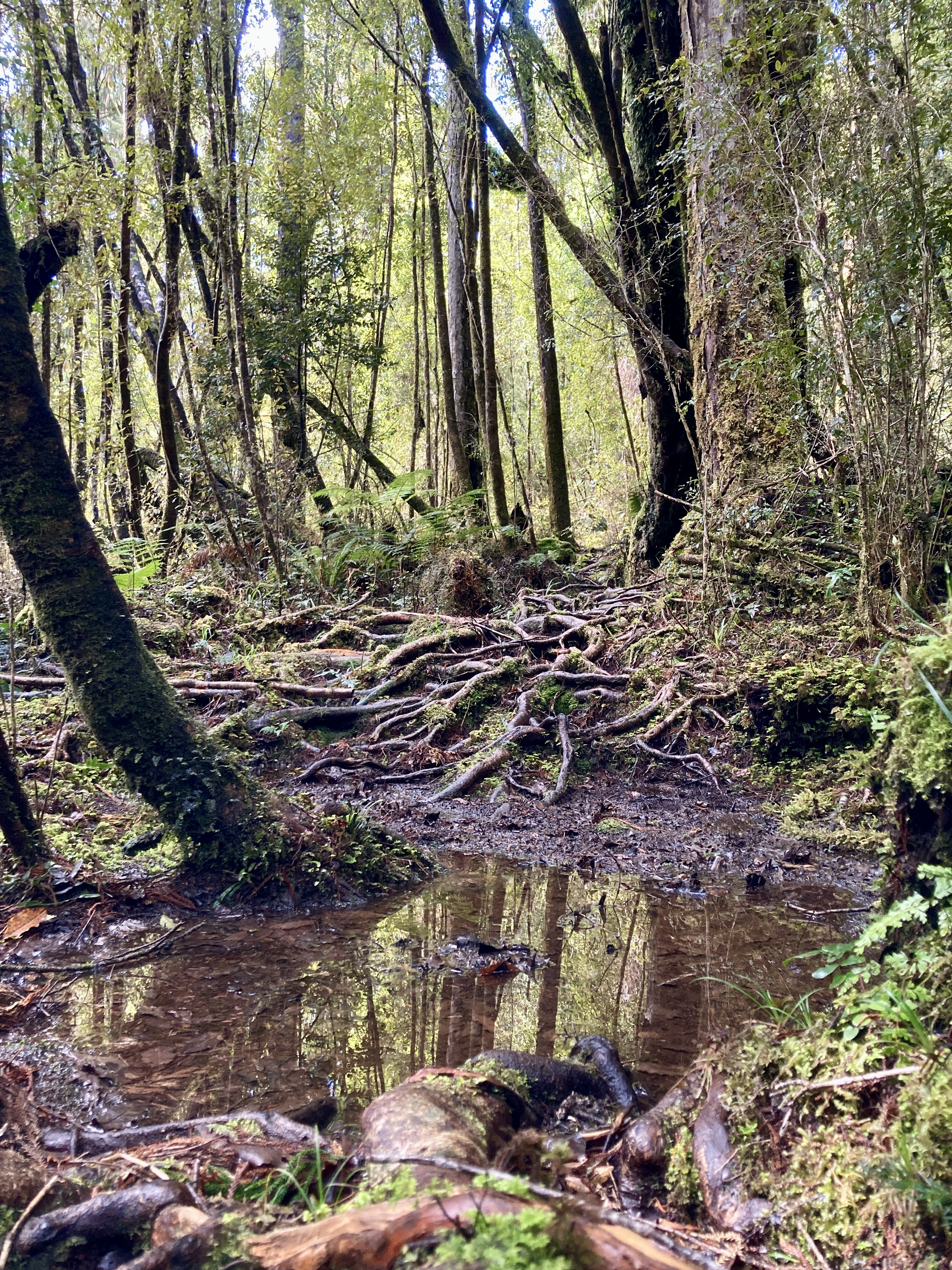

== Flora and fauna ==
The forest around Lake Gault is largely composed of rimu, southern rātā, and kāmahi. Horopito, tāwheowheo, kiekie, and hutu are common understory trees, and ferns and mosses such as Lomaria discolor and the giant moss Dawsonia superba are found on the forest floor.

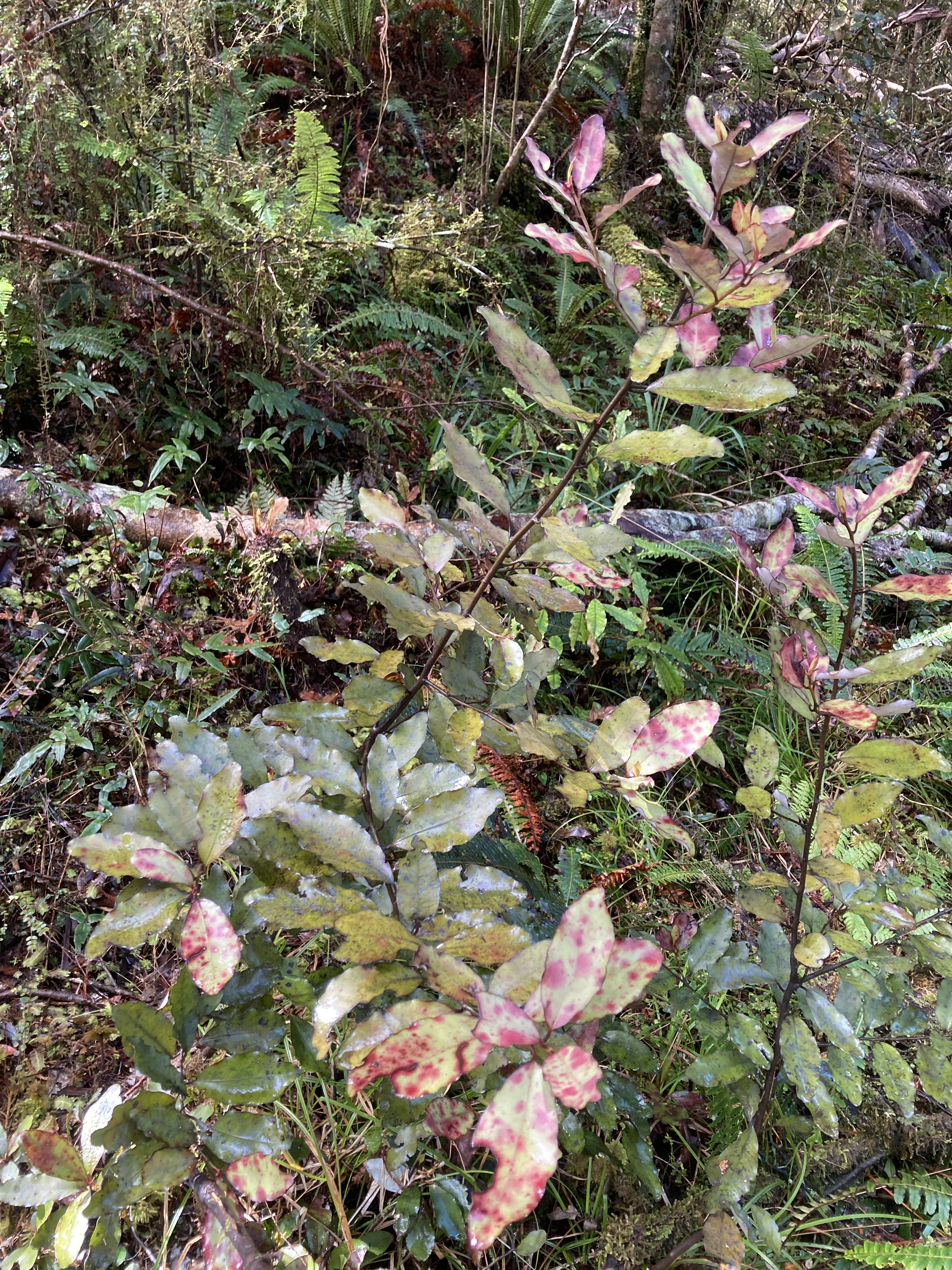
Horopito (Pseudowintera colorata)

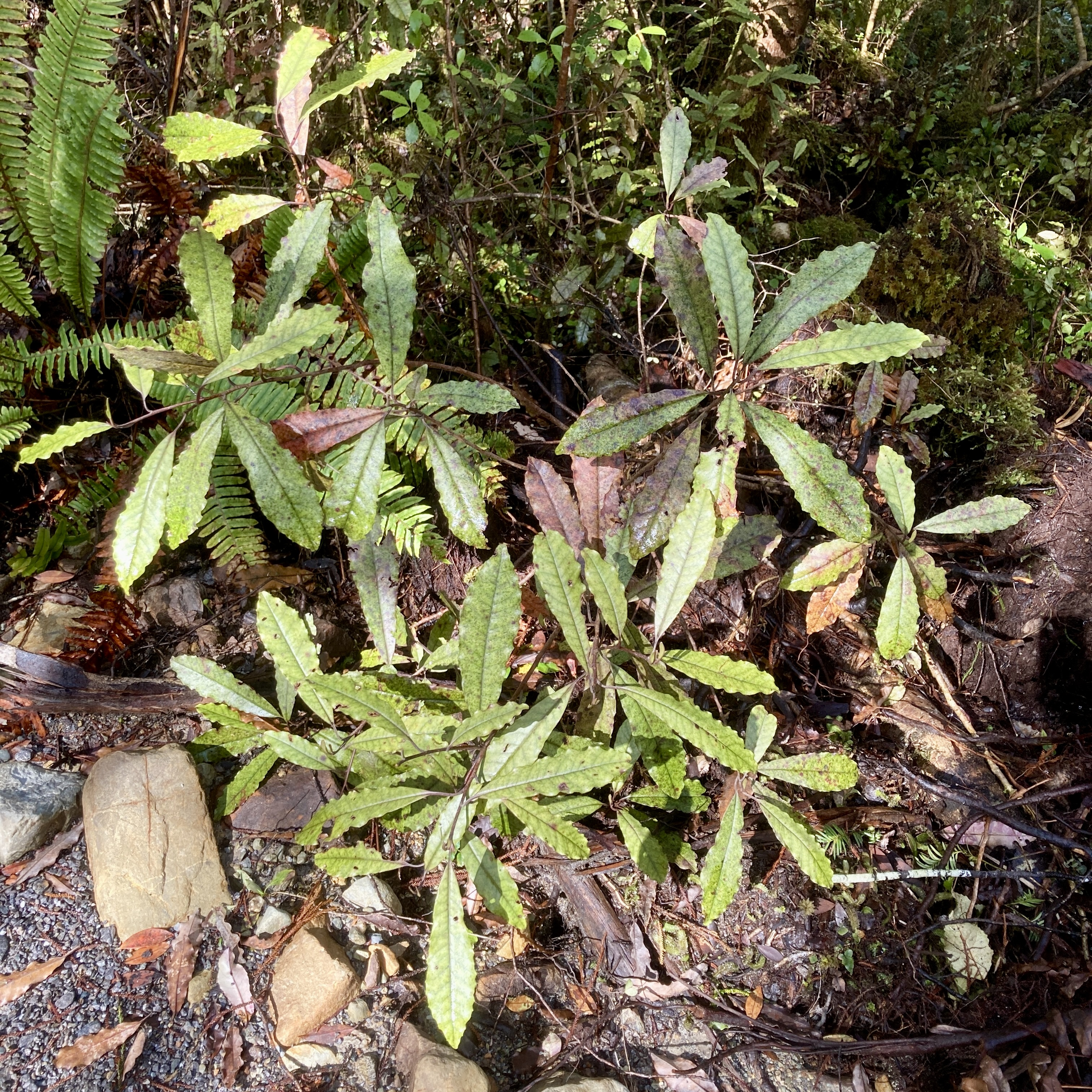
Tawheowheo (Quintinia serrata)

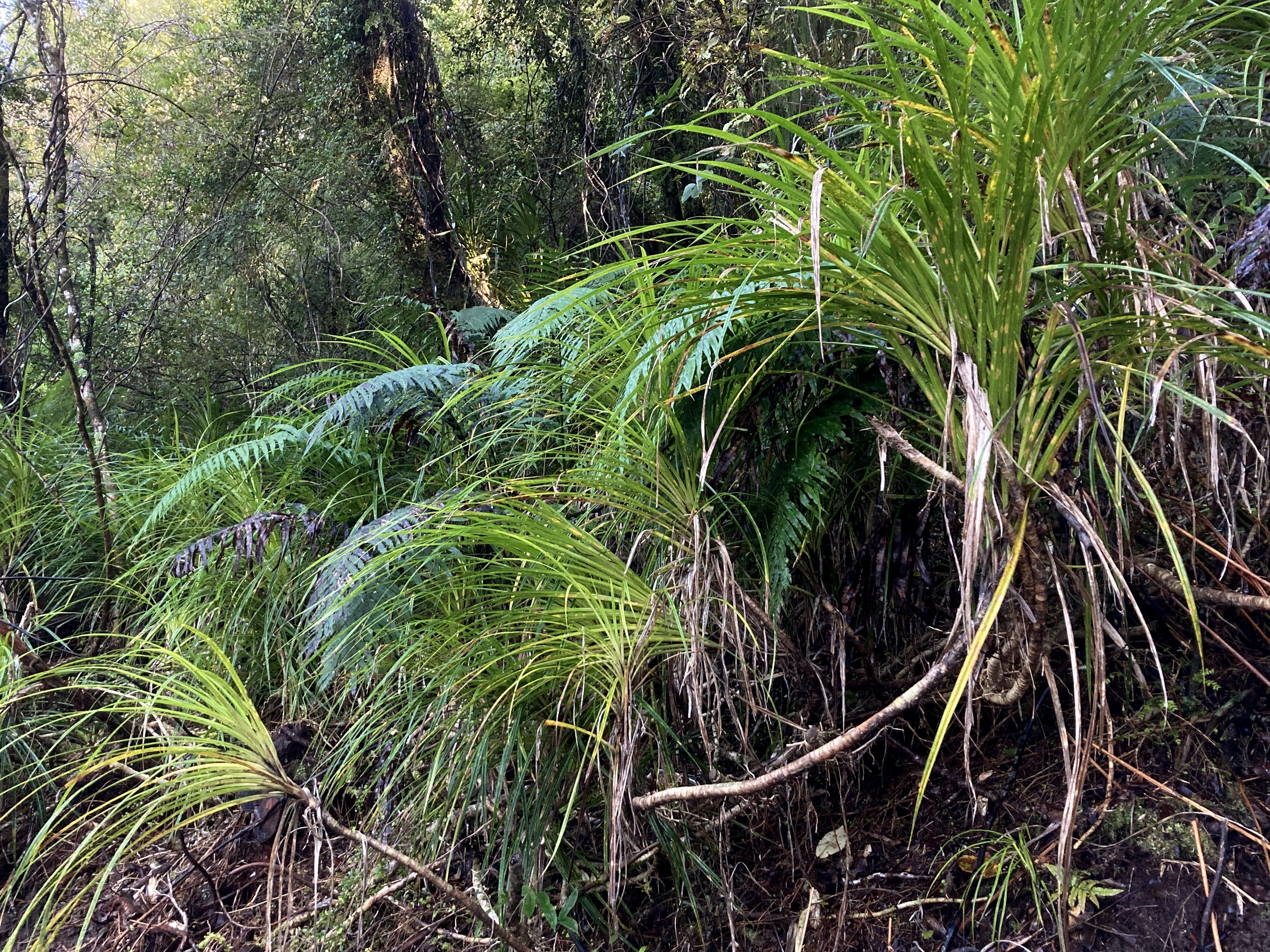
Kiekie (Freycinetia banksii)

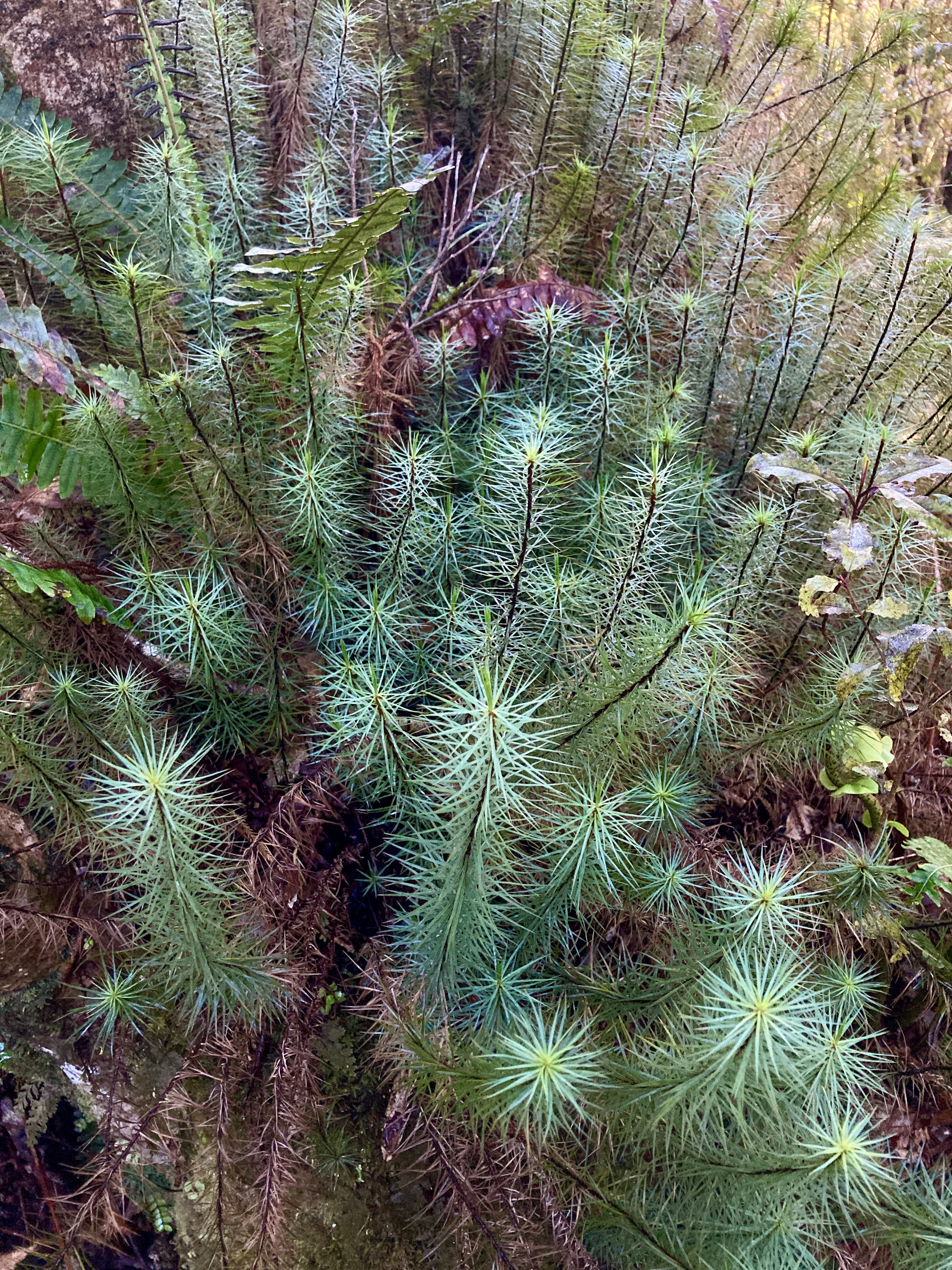
Dawsonia superba

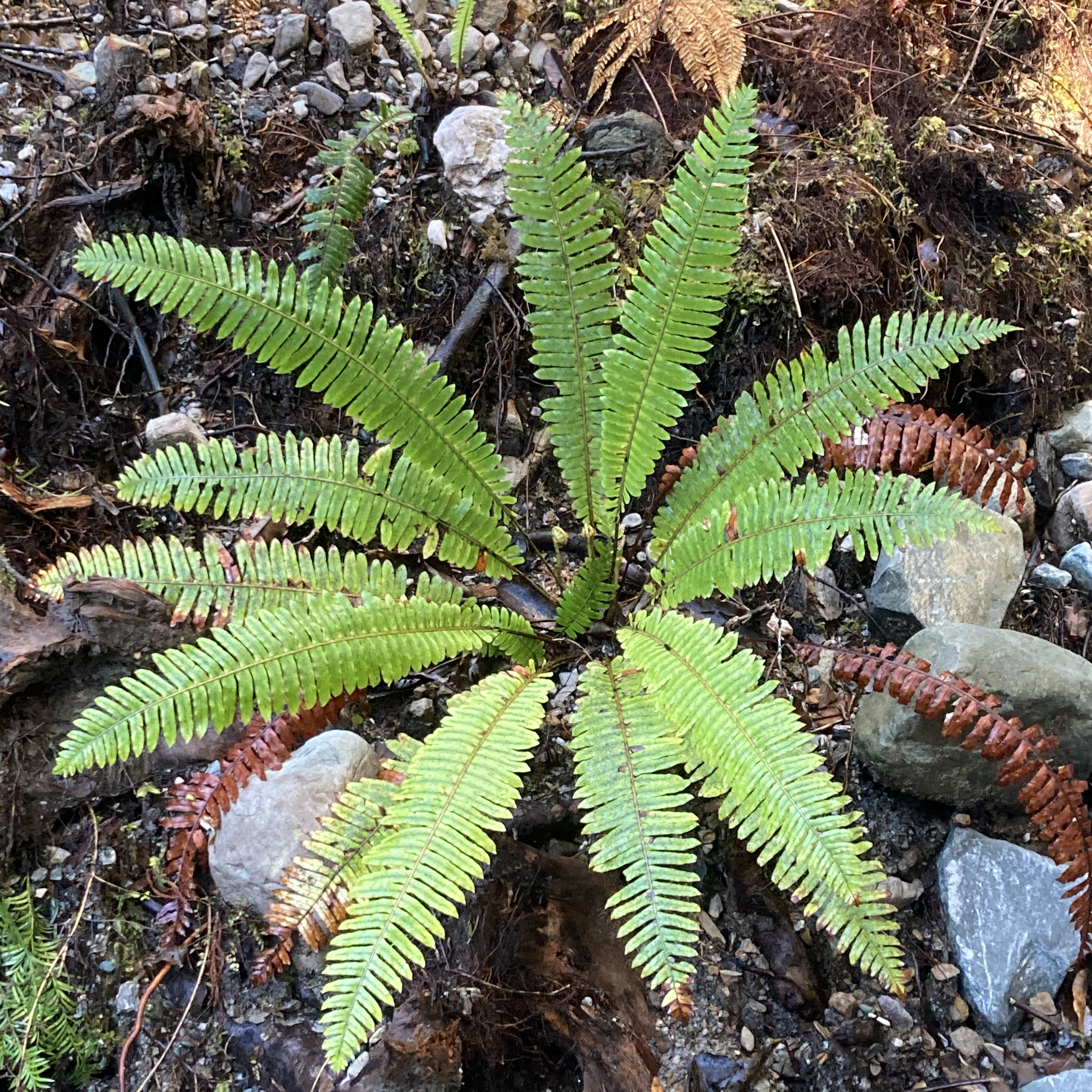
Crown fern (Lomaria discolor)

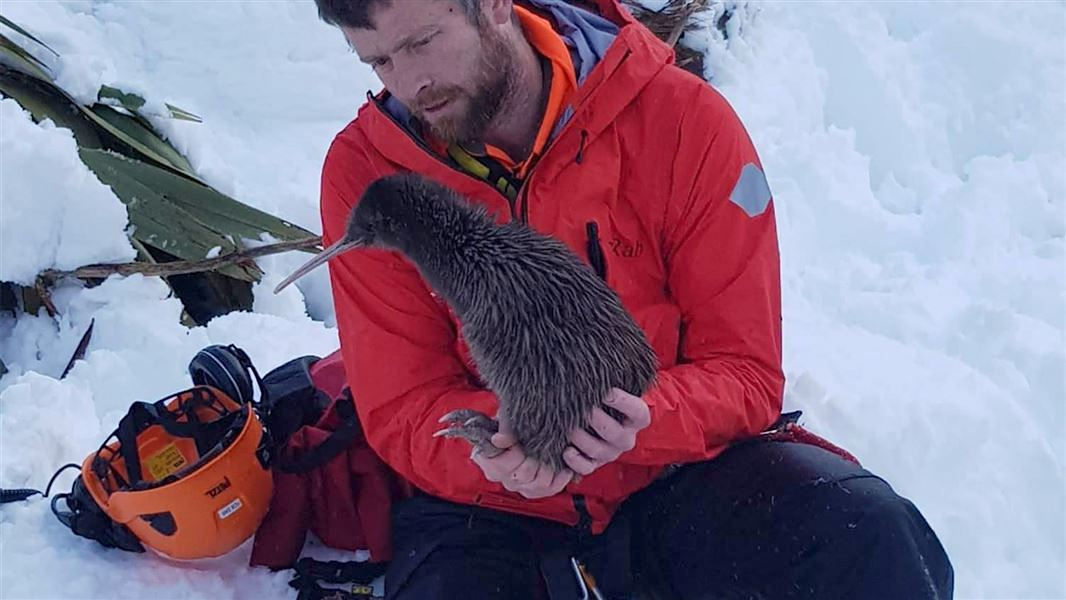
Rowi being rescued from mountains behind Fox Glacier after release at Lake Gault

As well as the usual forest birds like New Zealand tomtit, grey warbler, and fantail, the forest around Lake Gault is a reintroduction site for the rowi (Apteryx rowi), New Zealand's rarest kiwi species. By the late 1990s the world population or rowi had fallen to less than 200, all found in a single forest near Ōkārito. A species recovery programme run by the Department of Conservation called Operation Nest Egg removes rowi eggs from nesting burrows, incubates them at the West Coast Wildlife Centre, and rears the birds to adult weight on a predator-free offshore island. When Ōkārito Forest proved too crowded for further release, the forest around Lake Gault was chosen as site for a new population of rowi, and 27 were released there in December 2018. Most remained within a few hundred metres of the release site, but one travelled 12 km down the coast and inland, climbing the mountains behind Fox Glacier before having to be retrieved by a search-and-rescue team at an altitude of 1250 m.
