= Gillespies Point =

Point in New Zealand

Gillespies Point Kōhaihai (Māori)
- Point
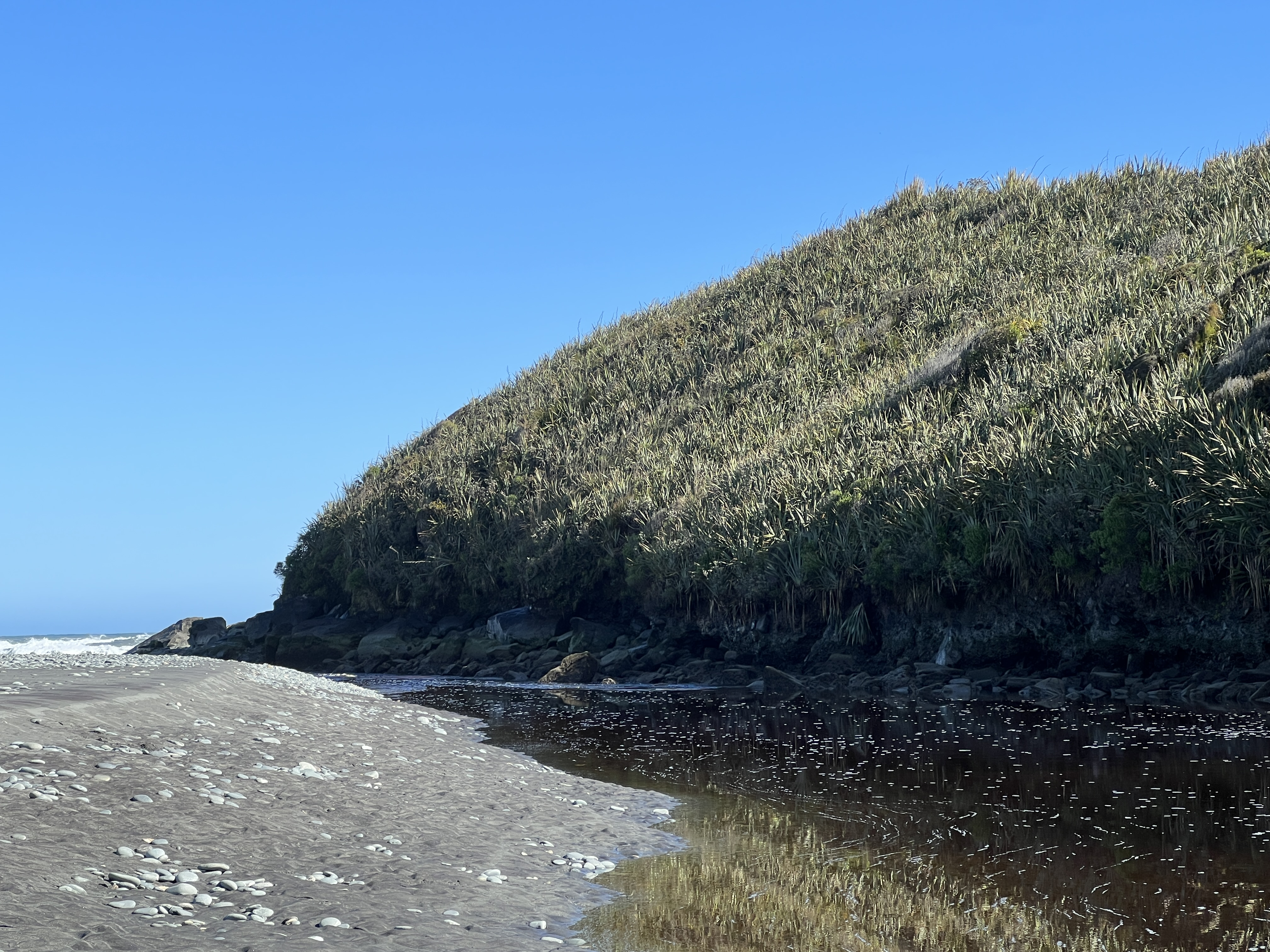
- Gillespies Point at the mouth of the Waikowhai Stream

- Location within New Zealand
- Coordinates: 43.397°S 169.841°E
- Location: Westland District, New Zealand
- Water bodies: Tasman Sea, Waikowhai Creek
- Formed by: Glaciation, coastal erosion
- Geology: Glacial moraine, primarily greywacke
- Etymology: Unclear Māori etymology. Named Gillespie after James Edwin Gillespie
- Defining authority: New Zealand Geographic Board
- Elevation: 21 metres (69 ft)

Gillespies Point (Māori: Kōhaihai; officially Gillespies Point / Kōhaihai) is a small headland on the west coast of New Zealand's South Island. The point marks the north-eastern end of Gillespies Beach and the western end of Waikowhai Bluff, as well as the mouth of Waikowhai Stream. The point is deemed to have high conservation value despite not being covered by Westland Tai Poutini National Park or Waiau Glacier Coast Marine Reserve, and is a relatively untouched haul-out site of New Zealand fur seals.

== Geography ==
Gillespies Point is located at the north-eastern limit of Gillespies Beach, which runs for roughly 5 kilometres (3.1 mi) between Kōhaihai and Otorokua Point to the southwest, approximately 16 kilometres (9.9 mi) from the town of Fox Glacier. The point is the westernmost portion of moraine deposits which extend from Cook Saddle, some 18 kilometres (11 mi) inland, deposited by glaciers in the region during earlier ice ages. Upon reaching the shore, erosion of this moraine has formed a line of coastal cliffs which stretches as far as the Waikūkūpa River, 15 kilometres (9.3 mi) to the northeast. In some areas, these cliffs have become further inland due to rivers in the area depositing large amounts of gravel along the region's shore.

Immediately to the south of Gillespies Point is the mouth of Waikowhai Stream, which separates the point from the beach to the south. This stream, along with its many tributaries, drains a large area of wetlands behind Gillespies Beach, which are ecologically significant and form part of Westland Tai Poutini National Park.

== History and name ==
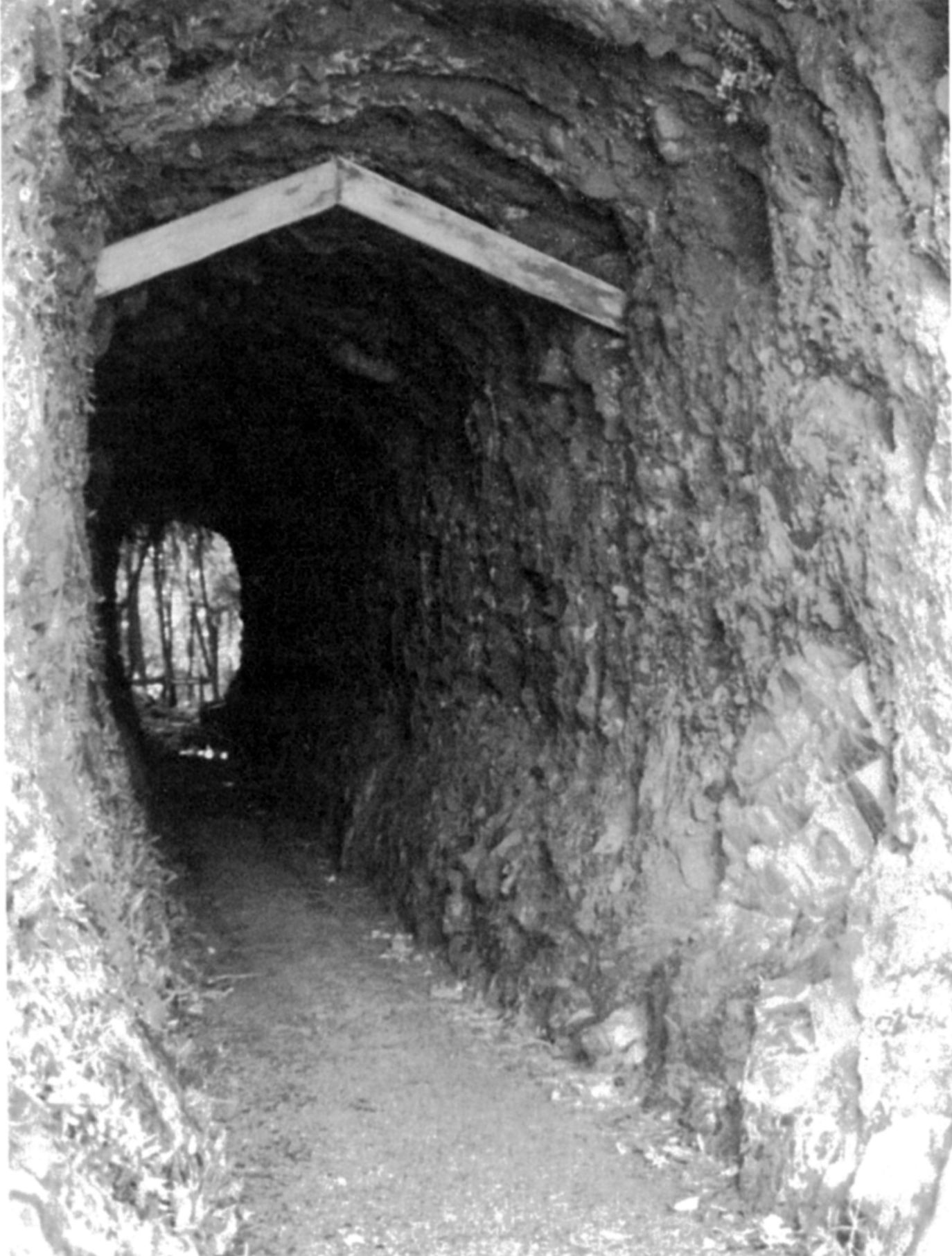
The mining tunnel carved into Gillespies Point

The headland was first known to local Māori as Kōhaihai (recorded in some early sources as Kaohaihi), although the origins of this name are not known. As Pākehā settlement of the area increased, the headland was renamed Gillespies Point after James Edwin Gillespie, who discovered gold on the beach in 1866 during the West Coast gold rush. At the time, the track to the region closely followed the coast due to the ease of navigating beaches compared to the dense forest of the interior, with bluffs and headlands such as Gillespies Point acting as significant obstacles and making the journey tide-dependent. To enable consistent access to Gillespies Beach and further south, as well as make the journey safer, miners in the area cut a tunnel through Gillespies Point, which has since been closed due to the impact of erosion at the seaward end.

In 1998, Gillespies Point became one of nearly 100 places to be given an official dual place name through the Ngāi Tahu Claims Settlement Act 1998, a landmark Treaty of Waitangi settlement between Ngāi Tahu and the New Zealand government, recognising the shared significance of the point to Pākehā and Māori of the region.

== Ecology ==
Despite not being included within the boundaries of Westland Tai Poutini National Park, Gillespies Point has been recognised as an area of high conservation value, and may be suitable as an addition to the National Park. The point is a small haul-out site of New Zealand fur seals, with just 35 seals counted during one survey. Although relatively small in size, this haul-out is significant due to its relative lack of human disturbance.

The forests of Gillespies Point are similar to those found across the moraine which it is part of, and consist mostly of young hardwood trees with a few more mature trees, such as kahikatea, rimu, or miro. Erosion of the coastline poses a threat to this forest, as does the salt spray from the nearby ocean.
