= Huttonite =

Thorium nesosilicate mineral

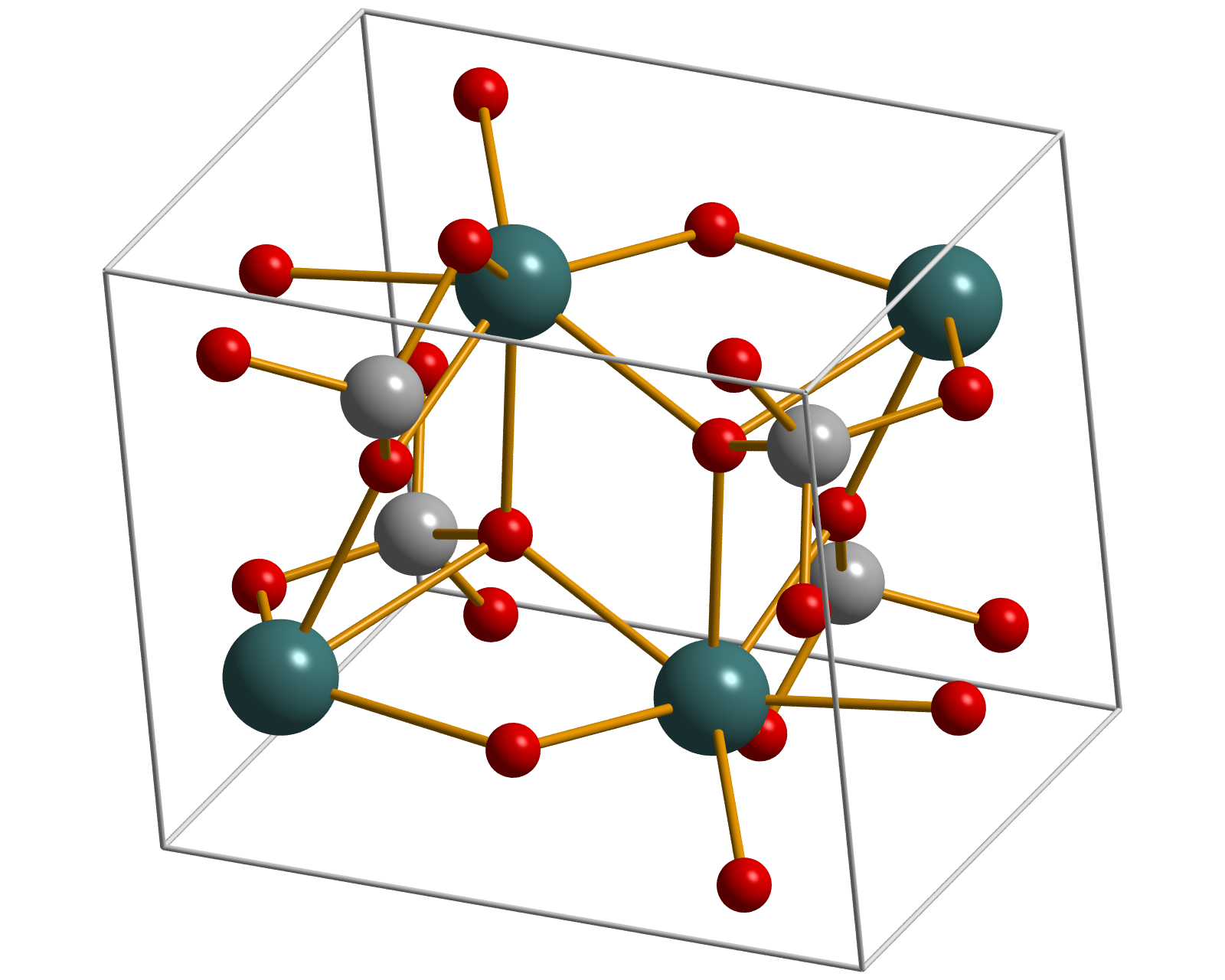
- Unit cell of huttonite

General
- Category: Silicate mineral
- Formula: ThSiO_{4}
- IMA symbol: Ht
- Strunz classification: 9.AD.35
- Crystal system: Monoclinic
- Crystal class: Prismatic (2/m) (same H-M symbol)
- Space group: P2_{1}/n
- Unit cell: a = 6.77 Å, b = 6.96 Å c = 6.49 Å; β = 104.99°; Z = 4

Identification
- Formula mass: 324.12 g/mol
- Color: Colorless, cream, pale yellow
- Crystal habit: Prismatic, flattened; typically as anhedral grains
- Cleavage: Distinct along [001], indistinct along [100]
- Fracture: Conchoidal
- Mohs scale hardness: 4.5
- Luster: Adamantine
- Streak: White
- Diaphaneity: Transparent to translucent
- Specific gravity: 7.1
- Optical properties: Biaxial (+)
- Refractive index: n_{α} = 1.898, n_{β} = 1.900, n_{γ} = 1.922
- Birefringence: δ = 0.0240
- 2V angle: 25°
- Dispersion: r < v (moderate)
- Ultraviolet fluorescence: Dull white (under shortwave)
- Other characteristics: Radioactive

Huttonite is a thorium nesosilicate mineral with the chemical formula ThSiO_{4} and which crystallizes in the monoclinic system. It is dimorphous with tetragonal thorite, and isostructual with monazite. An uncommon mineral, huttonite forms transparent or translucent cream–colored crystals. It was first identified in samples of beach sands from the West Coast region of New Zealand by the mineralogist Colin Osborne Hutton (1910–1971). Owing to its rarity, huttonite is not an industrially useful mineral.

== Occurrence ==
Huttonite was first described in 1950 from beach sand and fluvio-glacial deposits in South Westland, New Zealand, where it was found as anhedral grains of no more than 0.2 mm maximum dimension. It is most prevalent in the sand at Gillespies Beach, near Fox Glacier, which is the type location, where it is accompanied by scheelite, cassiterite, zircon, uranothorite, ilmenite and gold. It was found at a further six nearby locations in less plentiful amounts. Huttonite was extracted from the sands by first fractionating in iodomethane and then electromagnetically. Pure samples were subsequently obtained by handpicking huttonite grains under a microscope. This was accomplished either in the presence of short wave (2540 Å) fluorescent light, where the dull white fluorescence distinguishes it from scheelite (fluoresces blue) and zircon (fluoresces yellow), or by first boiling the impure sample in hydrochloric acid to induce an oxide surface on scheelite and permitting handpicking under visible light.

Hutton suggested the huttonite contained in the beach sand and fluvio-glacial deposits originated from Otago schists or pegmatitic veins in the Southern Alps.

In addition to New Zealand, huttonite has been found in granitic pegmatites of Bogatynia, Poland, where it associated with cheralite, thorogummite, and ningyoite; and in nepheline syenites of Brevik, Norway.

== Physical properties ==
Huttonite typically occurs as anhedral grains with no external crystal faces. It is usually colorless but also appears in colors; such as cream and pale yellow. It has a white streak. It has a hardness of 4.5 and exhibits distinct cleavage parallel to the c-axis [001] and an indistinct cleavage along the a-axis [100].

== Structure ==
Huttonite is a thorium nesosilicate with the chemical formula ThSiO_{4}. It is composed (by weight) of 71.59% thorium, 19.74% oxygen, and 8.67% silicon. Huttonite is found very close to its ideal stoichiometric composition, with impurities contributing less than 7% mole fraction. The most significant impurities to be observed are UO_{2} and P_{2}O_{5}.

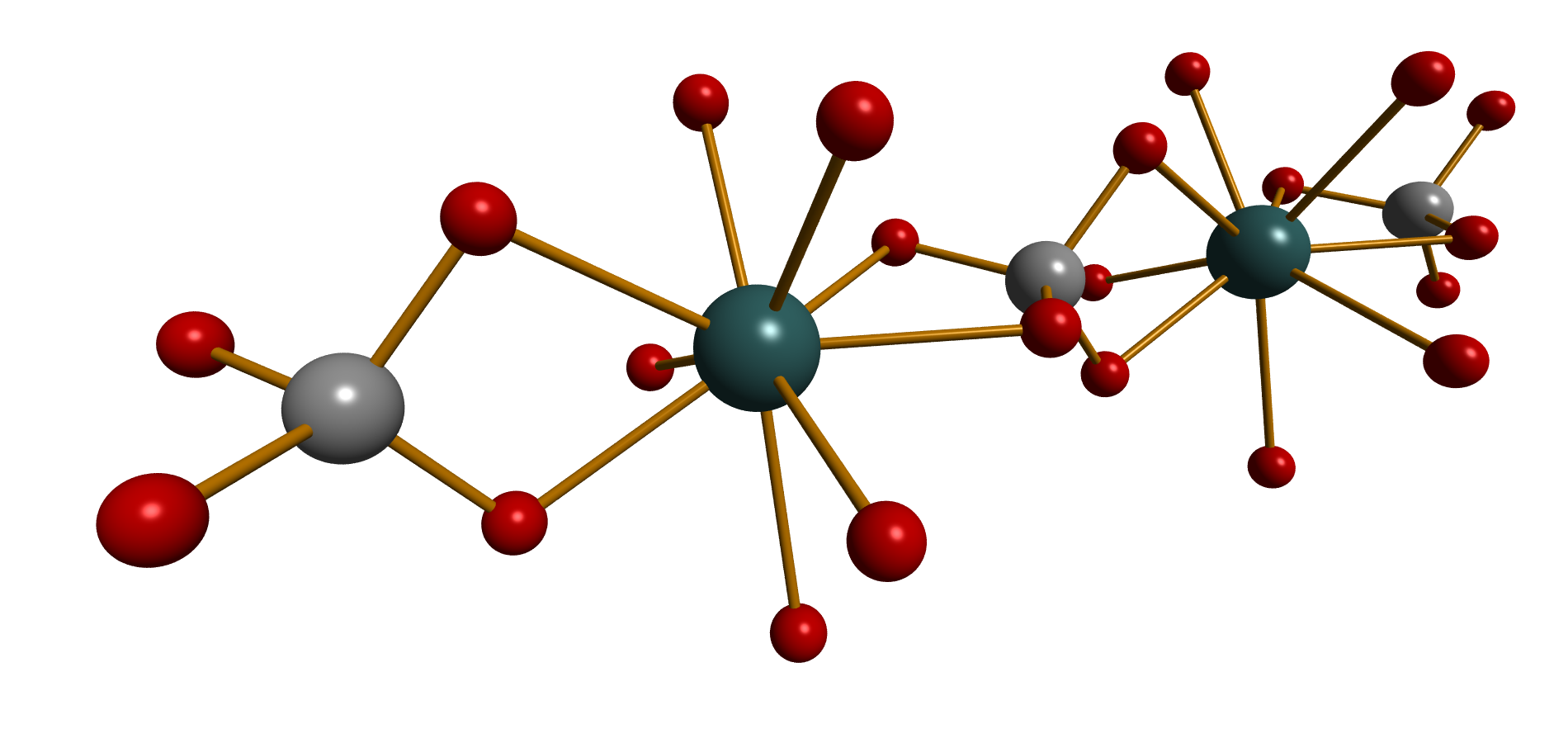
Atomic environment along a SiO_{4}–ThO_{5} chain (parallel to the c axis)

Huttonite crystallizes in the monoclinic system with space group P2_{1}/n. The unit cell contains four ThSiO_{4} units, and has dimensions a = 6.784 ± 0.002Å, b = 6.974 ± 0.003Å, c = 6.500 ± 0.003Å, and inter–axis angle β = 104.92 ± 0.03^{o}. The structure is that of a nesosilicate — discrete SiO_{4}^{2−} tetrahedra coordinating thorium ions. Each thorium has coordination number nine. Axially, four oxygen atoms, representing the edges of two SiO_{4} monomers on opposite sides of the thorium atom, form a (–SiO_{4}–Th–) chain parallel to the c axis. Equatorially, five nearly planar oxygen atoms representing vertices of distinct silicate tetrahedra coordinate each thorium. The lengths of the axial Th–O bonds are 2.43 Å, 2.51 Å, 2.52 Å, 2.81 Å, and of the equatorial bonds, 2.40 Å, 2.41 Å, 2.41 Å, 2.50 Å, and 2.58 Å. The Si–O bonds are nearly equal, with lengths 1.58 Å, 1.62 Å, 1.63 Å, and 1.64 Å.

Huttonite is isostructural with monazite. Substitution of the rare-earth elements and phosphorus of monazite with thorium and silicon of huttonite can occur to generates a solid solution. At the huttonite end-member, continuous rare-earth substitution of thorium of up to 20% by weight has been observed. Thorium substitution in monazite has been observed up to 27% by weight. Substitution of PO_{4} for SiO_{4} also occurs associated with the introduction of fluoride, hydroxide, and metal ions.

Huttonite is dimorphic with thorite. Thorite crystallizes in a higher symmetry and lower density tetragonal form in which the thorium atoms coordinate to one less oxygen atom in an octahedral arrangement. Thorite is stable at lower temperatures than huttonite; at 1 atmosphere, the thorite–huttonite phase transition occurs between 1210 and 1225 °C. With increasing pressure the transition temperature increases. This relatively high transition temperature is thought to explain the relative rarity of huttonite on the Earth's crust. Unlike thorite, huttonite is not affected by metamictization.
