= Fox Glacier Hotel =

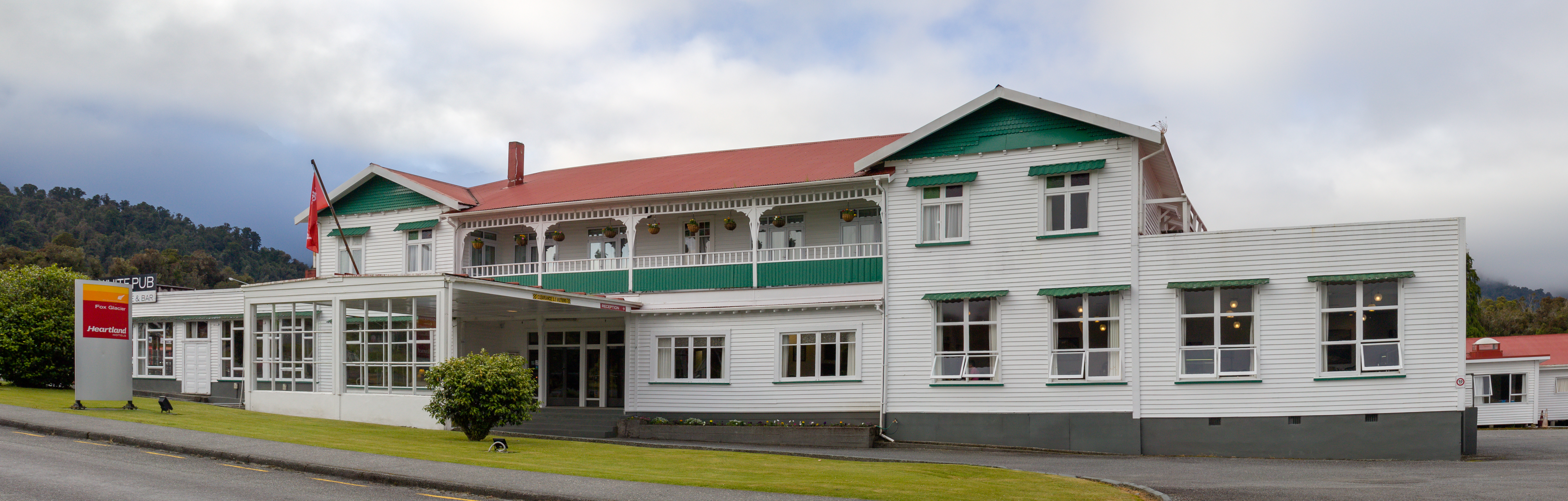
- Fox Glacier Hotel in 2020

General information
- Type: Hotel
- Address: 11 Cook Flat Road
- Town or city: Fox Glacier
- Country: New Zealand
- Coordinates: 43°27′52.56″S 170°1′0.03″E
- Opened: 20 December 1928
- Cost: £20,000

Technical details
- Material: Concrete foundations, heart rimu, corrugated steel roof

Heritage New Zealand – Category 2
- Designated: 21 September 1989
- Reference no.: 5045

Fox Glacier Hotel is a hotel in Fox Glacier, on the West Coast of New Zealand's South Island. Completed in 1928 for the Sullivan brothers, the building was granted historic place category 2 status by Heritage New Zealand in 1989.

== Context ==
In the 1920s, a concerted effort was made to promote the West Coast, and the glacier region in particular, as a tourist destination. At Fox Glacier village, then known as Weheka, the Sullivan family had used their farm homestead as tourist accommodation, but increased demand saw the Sullivan brothers, Mick and John, decide to construct a purpose-built hotel, and they established a sawmill to mill local rimu for the project.

== Architecture ==
The hotel was built in 1928, at a cost of approximately £20,000, and was officially opened on 20 December 1928. Although a two-storey building, the hotel was described as have a bungalow style, owing to the generous upper-floor verandahs. The hotel was built with 40 bedrooms, designed to accommodate up to 100 guests, as well as four parlours and a large dining room for up to 70 diners. The building measured 30 metres (100 ft) by 15 metres (50 ft), with a height of 11.6 metres (38 ft), and was constructed of heart rimu timber framing and weatherboards on a concrete foundation, with a corrugated steel roof. A large portico at the main entrance provided shelter for arriving and departing guests. Upholstery for the hotel was completed by Caliari and O'Connell of Hokitika, while the tiling, mantling and furnishing were completed by James Duncan Jr, assisted locally by Robert Emmett Clarke.

Electricity for the hotel was supplied from a small hydro-electric plant built by the Sullivans 2 km (1 1/4 mi) away. Outbuildings included a separate staff accommodation wing with eight bedrooms, a billiard room, and a garage measuring 15 metres (50 ft) by 12 metres (40 ft).

== Alterations ==
A large addition was made to the southeastern rear of the main building in the early 1950s, and the main facade gained flanking extensions in the 1950s and 1960s. In 2007 and more recently, significant refurbishment has been carried out.

== Current status ==
In 1989, Fox Glacier Hotel received historic place category 2 classification by the New Zealand Historic Places Trust (now Heritage New Zealand). The building remains in use as a hotel, restaurant, and bar.
