= Waikūkūpa River =

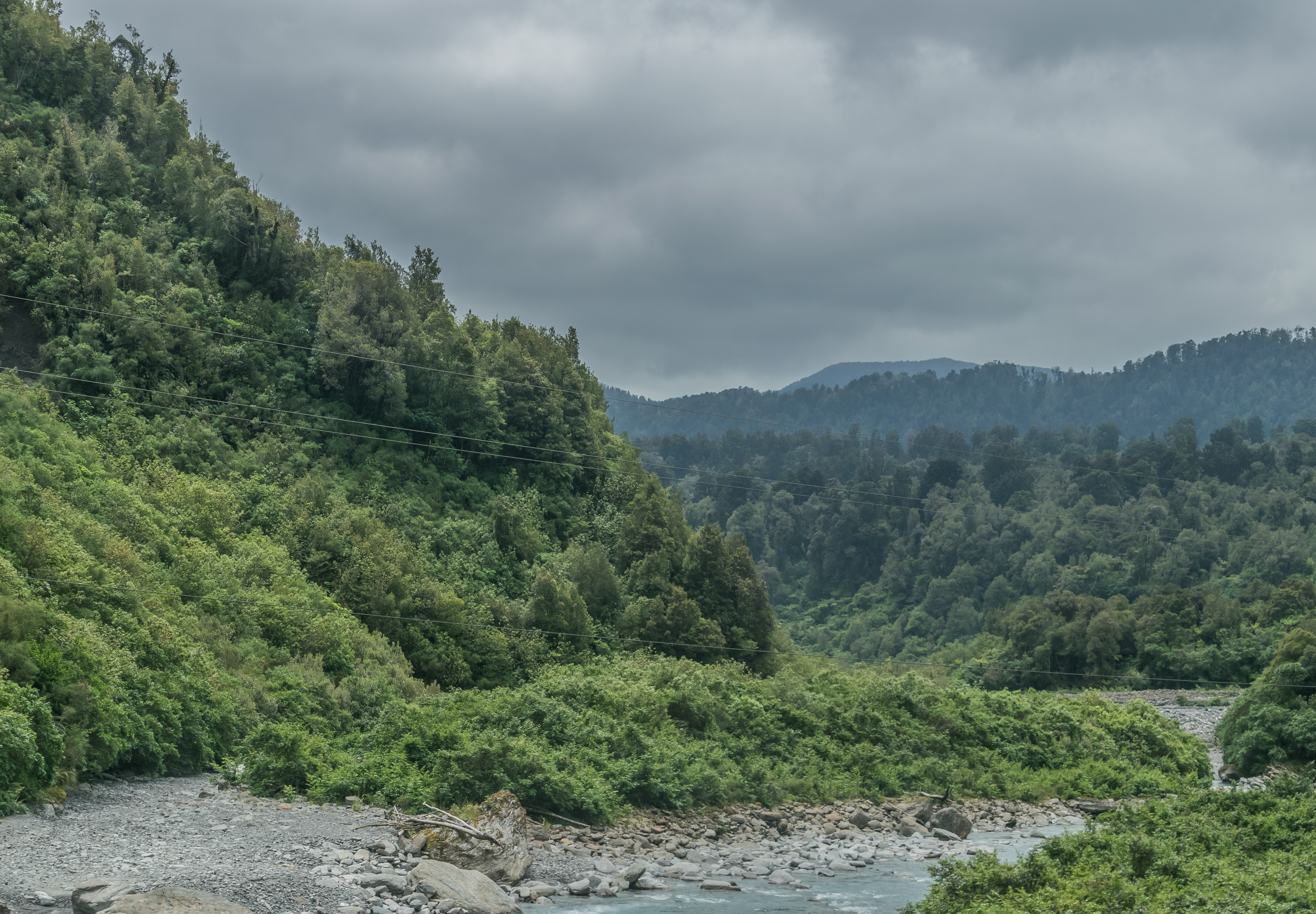
- Route of the Waikūkūpa River
- Mouth of the Waikūkūpa River Waikūkūpa River (New Zealand)

Location
- Country: New Zealand
- Region: West Coast
- District: Westland

Physical characteristics
- Source: Fritz Glacier
  - location: Southern Alps / Kā Tiritiri o te Moana
  - coordinates: 43.4795°S 170.1568°E
- Mouth: Tasman Sea
  - coordinates: 43°20′08″S 170°00′22″E
- Length: 16 km (9.9 mi)

Basin features
- Progression: Waikūkūpa River → Tasman Sea
- River system: Waikūkūpa River
- Tributaries
  - left: Joey Creek, Acrobat Creek, Molly Creek
  - right: Hare Mare Creek, Paddy Creek

The Waikūkūpa River is a river of the West Coast region of New Zealand's South Island. It flows northwest through Westland Tai Poutini National Park to reach the Tasman Sea 14 kilometres north of Fox Glacier township.

== See also ==
- List of rivers of New Zealand
