= Gillespies Beach =

New Zealand beach and settlement

- Settlement
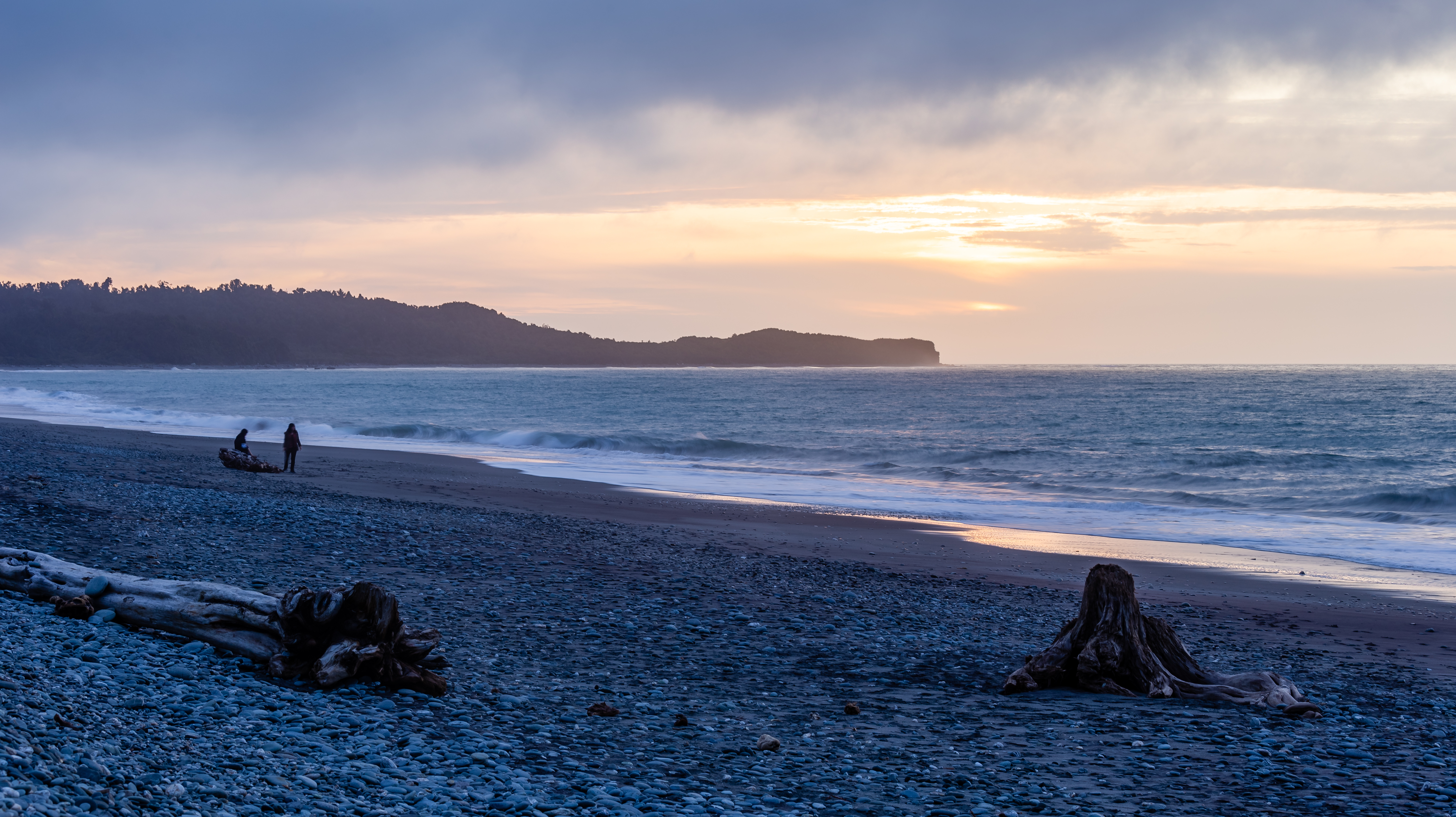
- Looking to Otorokua Point from Gillespies Beach

- Location within New Zealand
- Coordinates: 43°25′01″S 169°49′16″E
- Country: New Zealand
- Region: West Coast
- District: Westland District
- Electorates: West Coast-Tasman; Te Tai Tonga
- Time zone: UTC+12 (NZST)
  - Summer (DST): UTC+13 (NZDT)
- Postcode: 7886
- Area code: 03
- Local iwi: Ngāi Tahu

Gillespies Beach is a black sand beach and settlement on the West Coast of New Zealand's South Island, 20 kilometres (12 mi) west of Fox Glacier township by road. It is bounded by Westland Tai Poutini National Park to the east, and the Tasman Sea to the west. The beach itself stretches about five kilometres (3.1 mi) from Gillespies Point / Kōhaihai in the north to Otorokua Point in the south.

== Access ==
The access road to Gillespies Beach begins from the Cook River / Weheka flats, before passing over moraines of the Fox Glacier dating from 14,000 years ago. The road is unsealed, winding and narrow, with rimu forest on each side.

== Geography ==
Gillespies Beach is a gravel beach with stable dunes. It is one of the largest beach/dune systems in Westland.

Approximately 112 ha (280 acres) at Gillespies Beach is protected as a stewardship area under section 25 of the Conservation Act 1987. The protected area includes the mouth of several small streams, wetlands, a lagoon and areas covered in shrub and coastal forest, as well as the historic mining sites. The area known as Waikōhai to the north of Gillespies Point is an important site for Ngāi Tahu, because it includes historic occupation sites, urupā (burial sites) and mahinga kai (food gathering) sites. The direct view of Aoraki / Mount Cook from the beach is also significant because it provides a visual link to the whakapapa (origin story) of Ngāi Tahu.

A new type of mineral was identified in the sand at Gillespies Beach in the 1950s by the mineralogist Colin Osborne Hutton (1910–1971). The mineral was given the name Huttonite and Gillespies Beach is the type locality.

== Settlement ==
When James Cook sighted the South Westland coast in mid-March 1770, he commented on the "ridge of Mountains which are of a prodigious height and appear to consist of nothing but barren rocks, cover'd in many places with large patches of snow which perhaps have laid there since the creation", and mentioned the "wooded hills" in front of the mountains, and the "prodigious surf".

During the West Coast gold rush, prospector James Edwin Gillespie was returning with other miners from a gold-rush hoax at Bruce Bay, and discovered gold in the black sands above the high tide mark here in April 1866. Other prospectors soon took up claims in the area, and within a month miners were making profits of £5 to £6 a week. Gillespies Beach grew rapidly, and by May 1866 had a population of 600, and had two butcheries, two bakeries and 11 stores (mostly public houses). Supplies were carried along the beach by pack horse from Ōkārito.

At its height, Gillespies Beach was the third-largest settlement on the West Coast: only Ōkārito and Five Mile were larger—the Okarito Gold Warden reported 500 miners working the sands. By September, the population in the area was decreasing as best surface gold was taken, and in November 1866, there were around 150 people living in the area, with six stores. By 1867 a gold rush at Haast reduced the community to 50 miners, supplied by a butcher, a bakery and three stores. By 1869 the Gold Warden's report stated the estimated population was just 30.

With the construction of two water-races, sluicing sand for gold became feasible, and the population increased again, with men returning from Five Mile to Gillespies. By December 1870, the local population was 125, with homes and gardens constructed. Two hotels remained, and two stores, including a butcher, but provisions were hard to come by. Early reports of the settlement commented on the quarrelsome nature of the miners, who were often not on speaking terms. Charlie Douglas was particularly forthright:

The law which prohibits people from murdering each other ought in my opinion to be modified in the case of the Okarito and Gillespies district. If Gillespies is bad it cant [sic] hold a candle to the Paringa in the matter of quarreling. There are three parties on the river, all Irish and the excitable brand at that. How any are alive is a mystery.

By 1875, the community included 36 children, although there was no local school, and this was the subject of complaints. In 1877, the settler community built a school and formed a School Committee; in 1880 the first Government-employed teacher, C.M. Nielsen, arrived. The school was the largest building in the settlement, so was used for community meetings and dances as well. In 1886 Henry (Harry) Williams arrived to teach—he later became Assistant Master at Hokitika District High School and moved to St Patrick's College in Wellington.

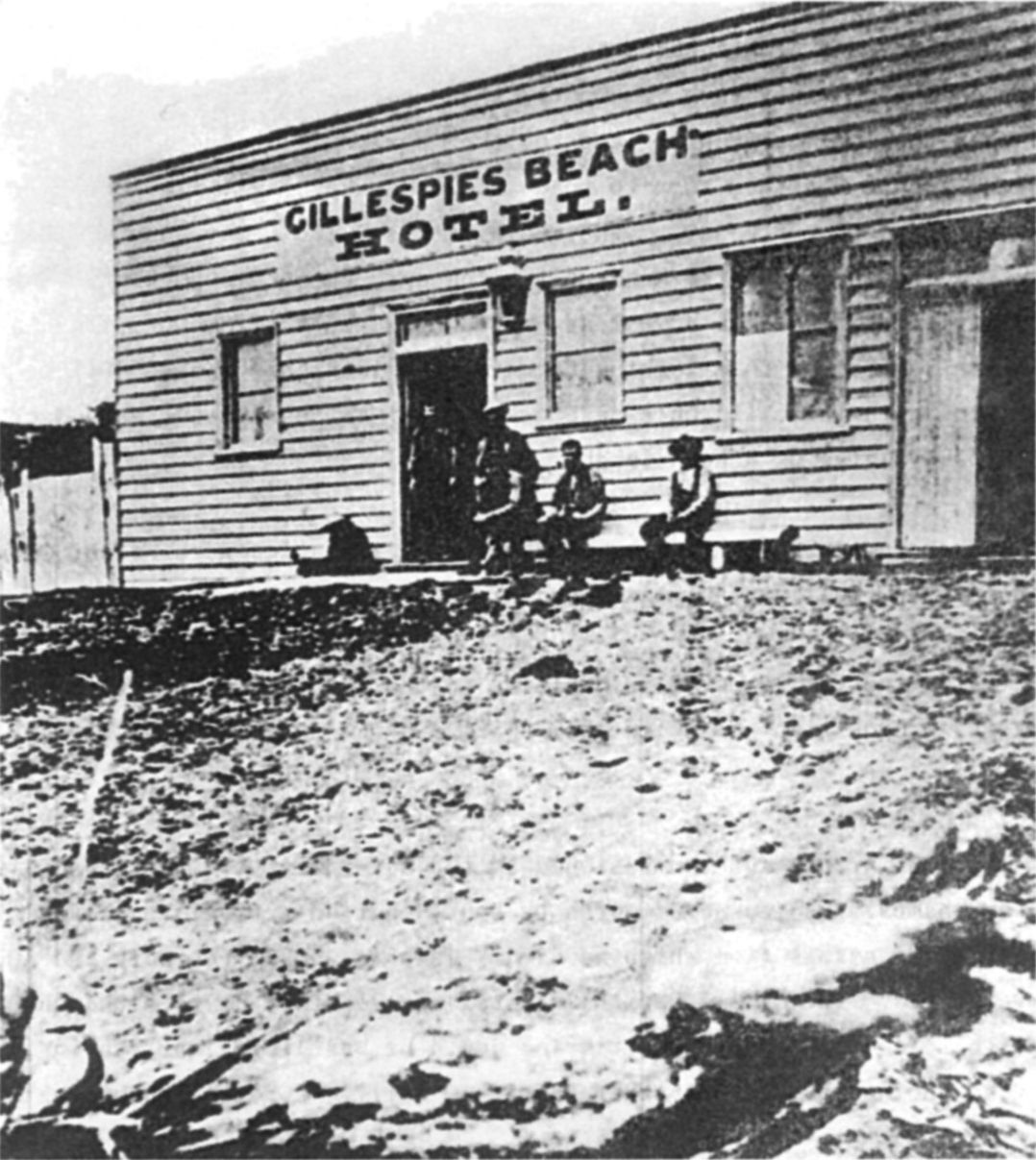
Gillespies Beach Hotel c. 1890s

The difficulties of working claims at Gillespies Beach included a hazardous journey of 20 mi (32 km) to the nearest port at Ōkārito, requiring travel along the sea coast beneath dangerous bluffs. There were no roads, no medical care – the nearest doctor was at Ross, 80 miles to the north – and supplies often cost double the Ōkārito price. If rivers rose after heavy rain, it could delay stores arriving by weeks. Miners built a tunnel through Gillespies Point at the north of the beach, to avoid the bluffs and enable passage along the coast even at high tide. Inhabitants were confined to the coastal strip by dense forest and suffered under heavy rain, westerly gales, and clouds of sandflies and mosquitoes. By the 1890s, the few inhabitants were raising horses, sheep, and a few dairy cows, and bringing in cattle for slaughter along the beaches. Occasional mail was brought in 80 miles from Hokitika by horse.

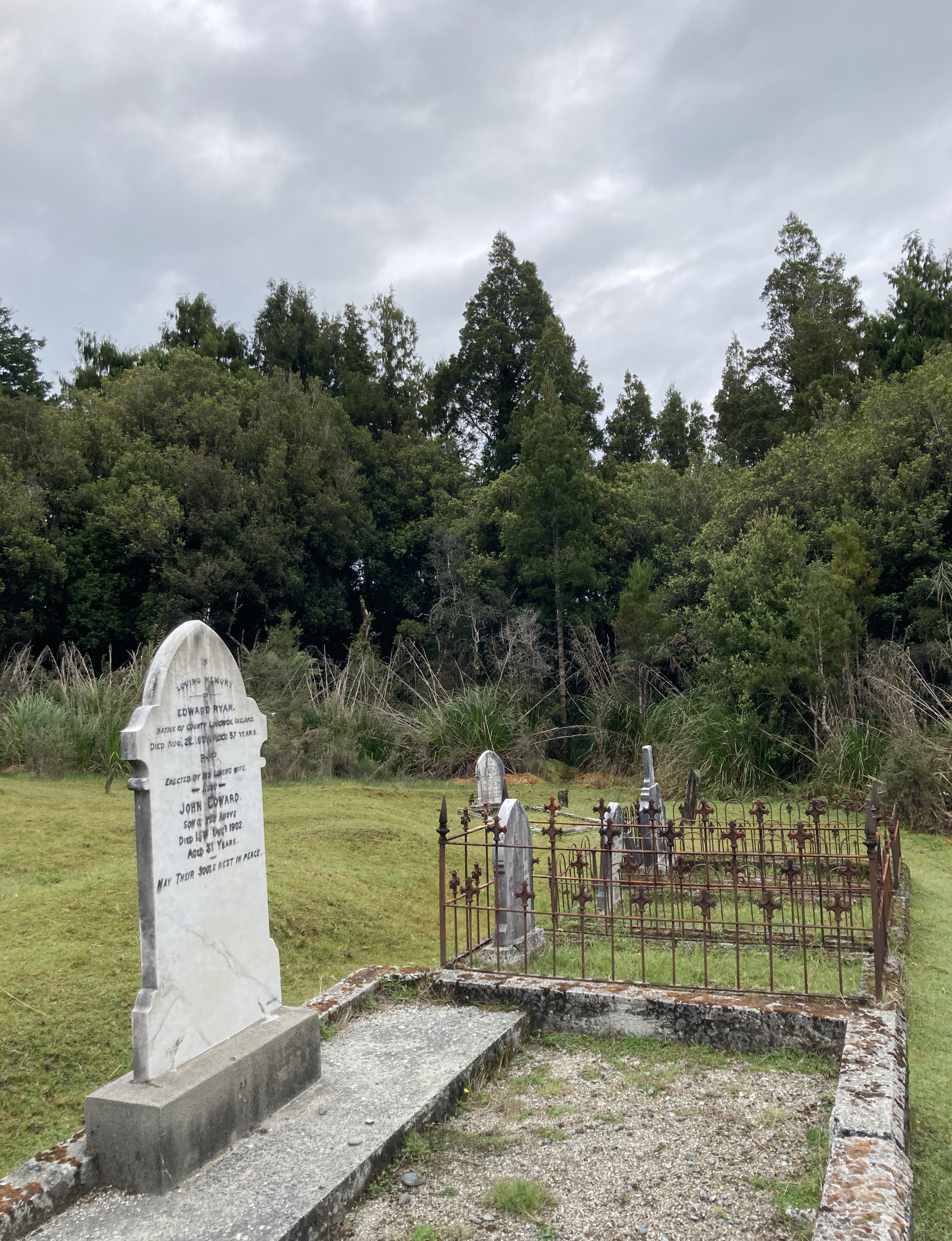
Miners Cemetery

Harper was scathing about the settlement:

Gillespies Beach was a so-called "township", a pub and two stores, perched just behind the top of the beach, amongst the sandhills—the most god-forsaken place imaginable.

Gillespies Beach after its heyday was described by Douglas as

never even a paper township, but entirely a digging one, and has supported a fluctuating population for many years. It passed the calico era, and almost attained to the dignity of the weatherboard, but not quite. It now contains a few diggers huts, a store & school house, with of course the usual pub, but its life cannot last long as the beach is nearly worked out. It has however lasted longer than any of the diggers Townships of Southern Westland, and contains a chapel – still standing – a building none of the others ever possessed.

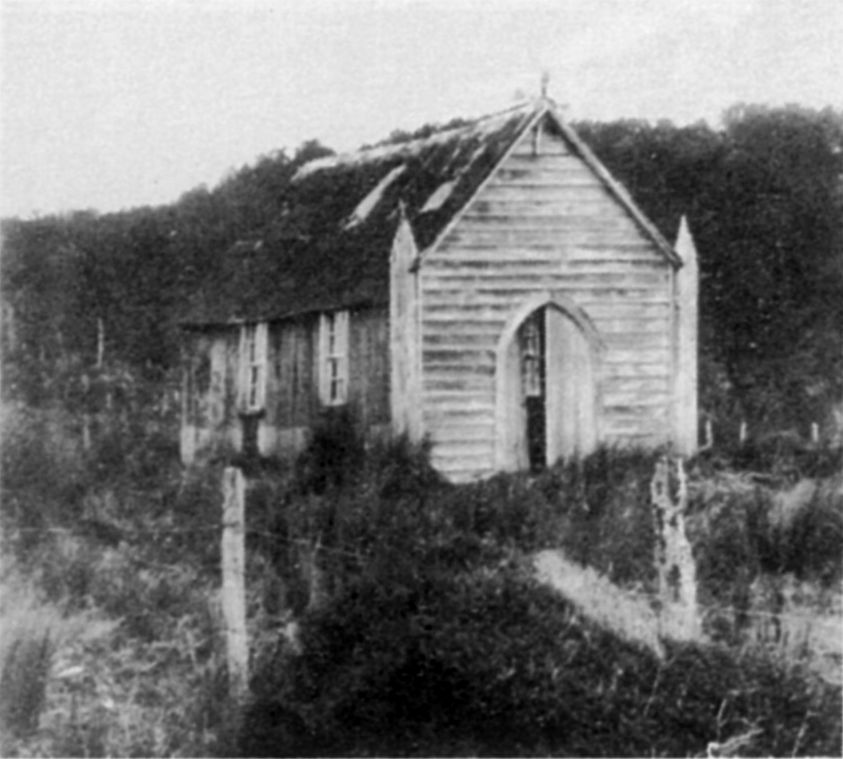
The Catholic church in the 1920s

Because many of the miners were Roman Catholic, a small church was built, and a priest would visit from Ross at six-monthly intervals to conduct baptisms and weddings; funerals were conducted by members of the community, and a cemetery containing is located close to the original settlement. Even after the majority of the population had moved inland, they would return to Gillespies Beach to attend Mass. The church was demolished in the 1930s to allow for gold dredging.

Today only a few buildings remain and the settlement is almost a ghost town.

== Gold mining ==
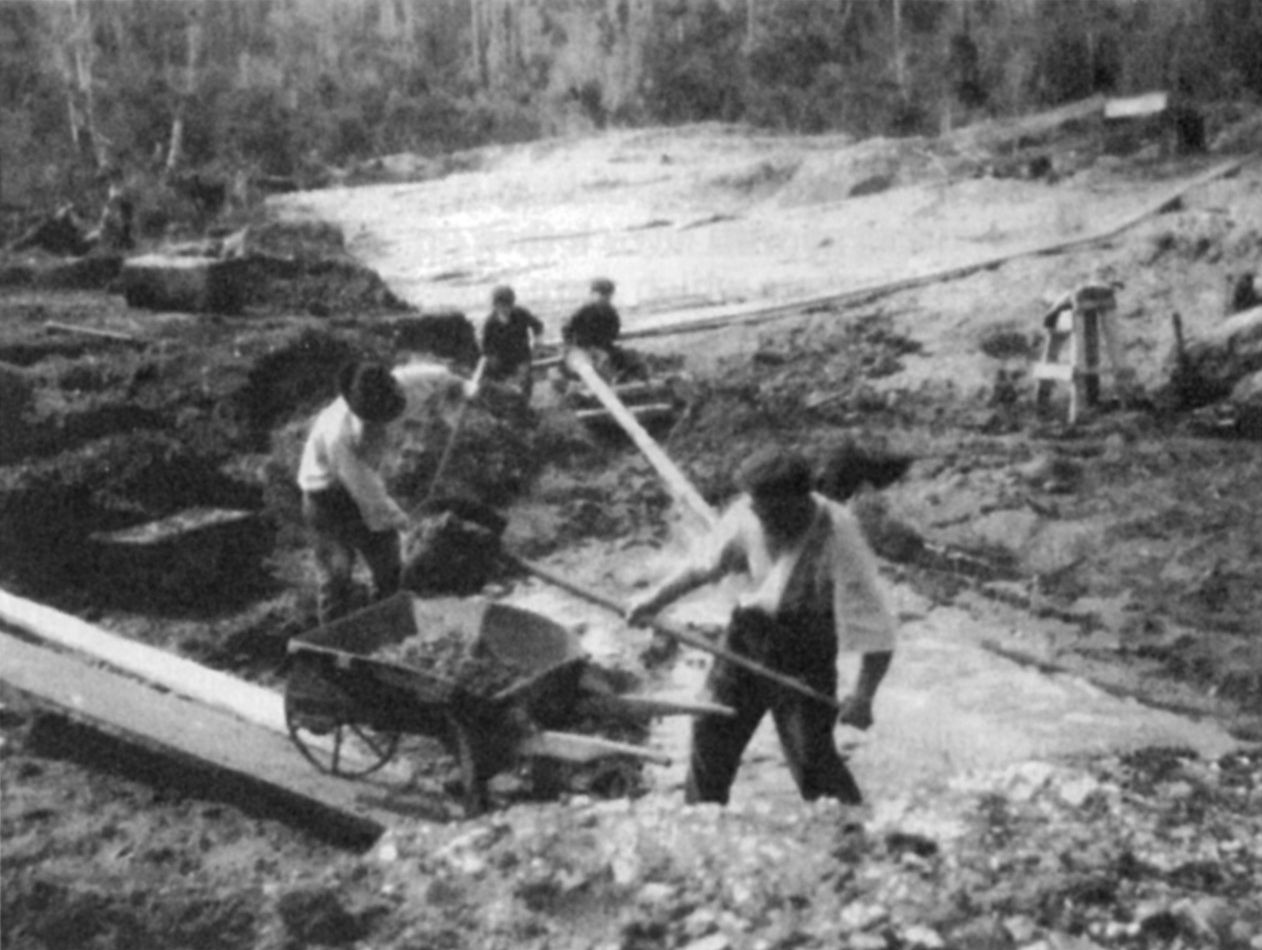
Stripping to reach gold deposits

In July 1866, it was reported that 11,000 ounces (310 kg) of gold had been shipped during the month of June. Two water races, one five miles long, were constructed to enable sluicing: this entailed "stripping", or removal of surface vegetation and sand to depths of 6–30 feet, to expose seams which could be washed to extract the gold dust.

In 1883, around 30–40 miners were still working the black sand.

From the late 19th to the mid 20th century, gold dredges worked the sand dunes. One early type of dredge built at the site was a Von Schmidt suction dredge. The equipment was manufactured in Christchurch in 1891 and used two wood-fired steam boilers as a power source, with the machinery installed on a hull supported by wooden piles. However, the suction dredge proved to be a complete failure. By 1892, the Gillespies Beach Gold Dredging Company was in liquidation. The suction dredge was subsequently converted into a bucket dredge.

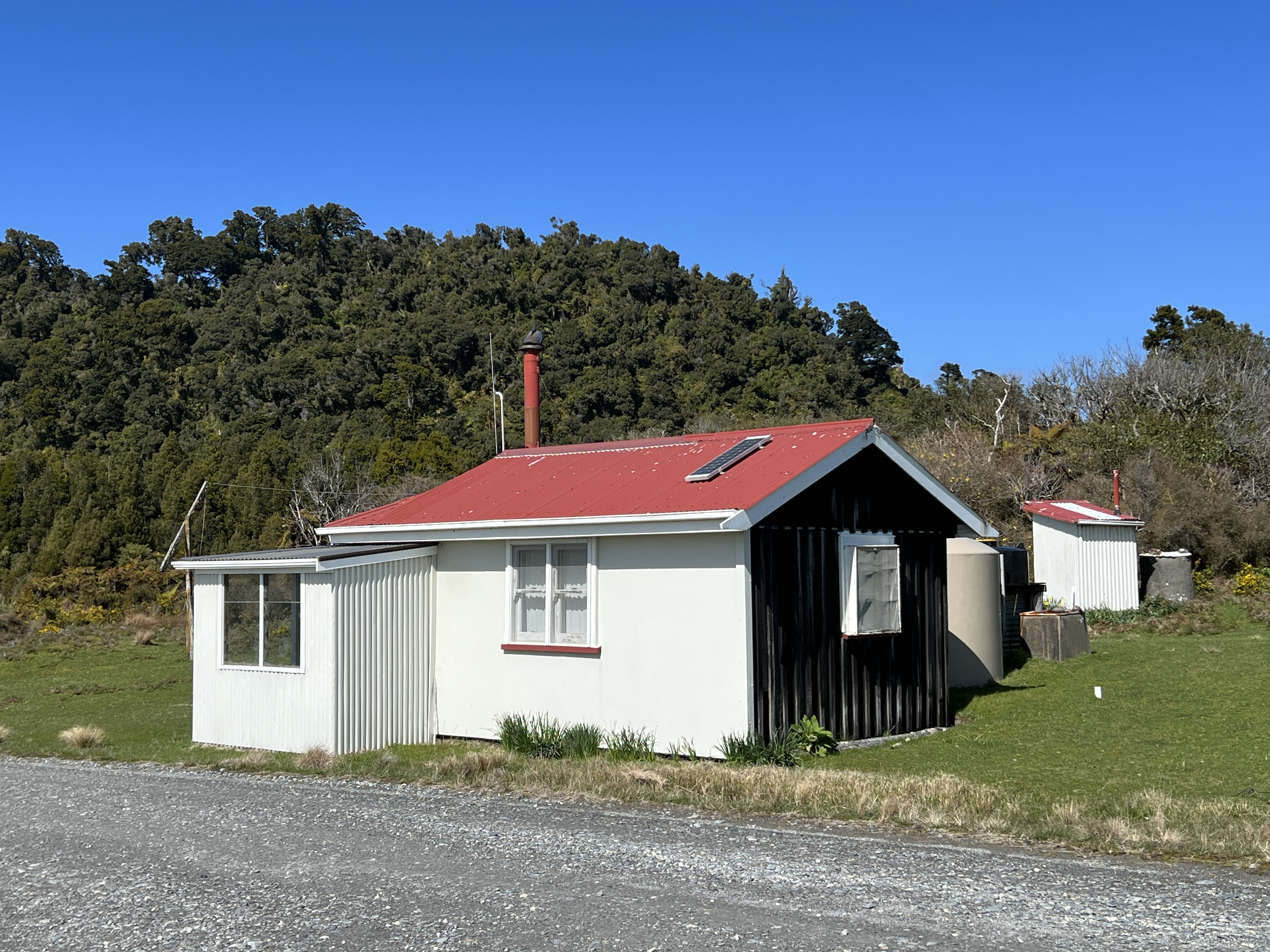
Cottage at Gillespies Beach (2023)

In 1944 there was a demand for radioactive materials for the war effort, and the dredge sands were tested for uranium, but although there was some radioactivity the concentration was not sufficient for recovery to be economic. The last operational dredge at Gillespies Beach suspended operations in 1947. Small-scale mining continues between the settlement and Ototokua Point to the south.

== Tourism ==
There are five walking tracks from the Gillespies Beach campsite and car park, ranging in length from 270 metres (300 yd) up to 6.8 kilometres (4.2 mi). A rusting dredge from the 1930s can be seen a short walk north from the settlement.

At the north end of the beach is Quinlin Creek lagoon and Gillespies Creek. A bridge over the lagoon connects to a track that was originally a packtrack used by miners to bypass Gillespies Point. In the late 1800s, miners dug a tunnel through the hill to improve access. There is a tramping track beyond the miners’ tunnel to Galway Beach where there is a colony of New Zealand fur seals.
