= Fox Glacier (village) =

Town in the West Coast Region of New Zealand

Fox Glacier Weheka (Māori)
- Village
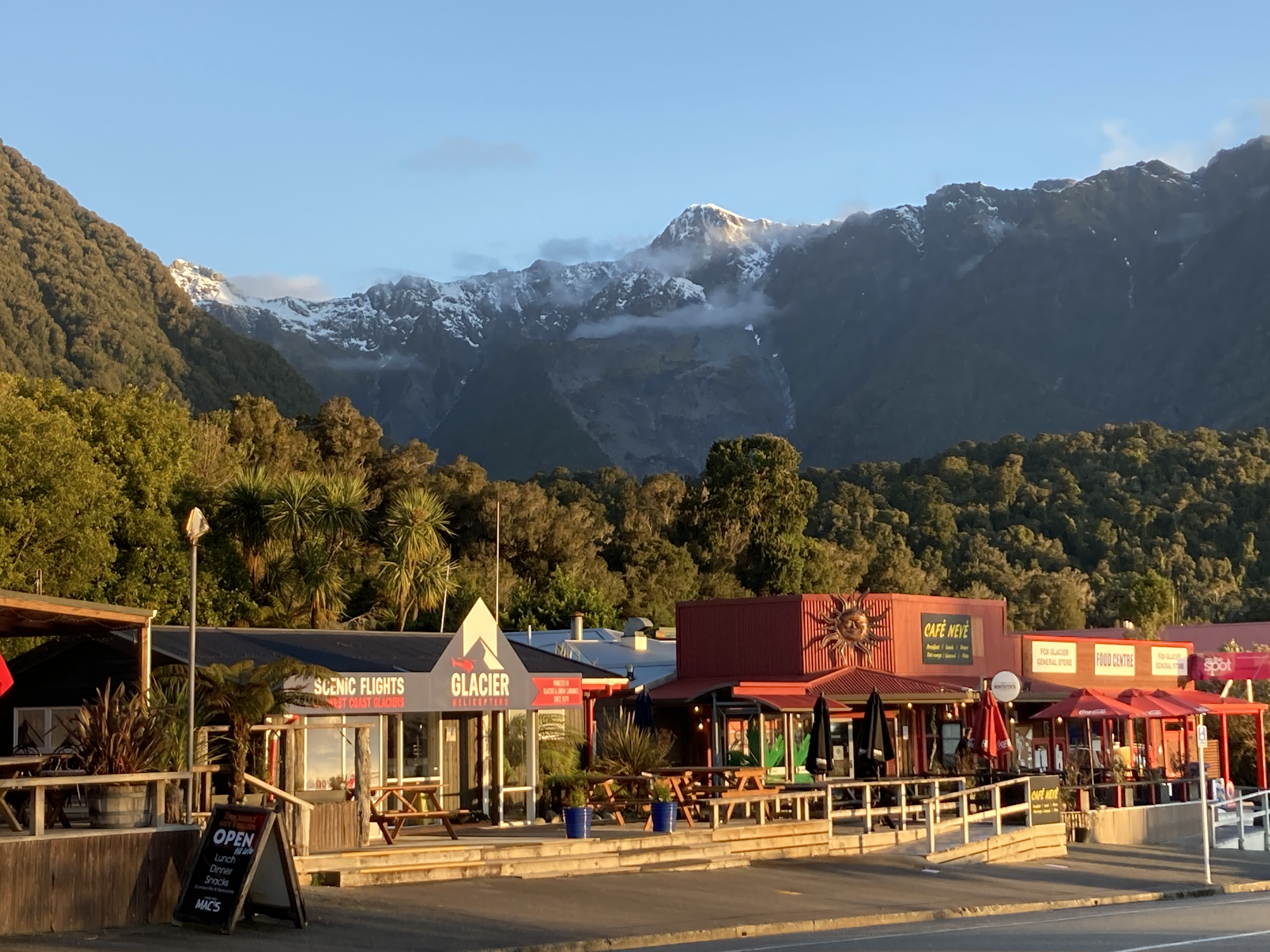
- Fox Glacier and Craig Peak
- Interactive map of Fox Glacier
- Coordinates: 43.466°S 170.020°E
- Country: New Zealand
- Region: West Coast
- District: Westland District
- Ward: Southern
- Electorates: West Coast-Tasman; Te Tai Tonga

Government
  - Territorial Authority: Westland District Council
  - Regional council: West Coast Regional Council
  - Mayor of Westland: Helen Lash
  - West Coast-Tasman MP: Maureen Pugh
  - Te Tai Tonga MP: Tākuta Ferris

Area
  - Total: 2.81 km^{2} (1.08 sq mi)

Population (June 2025)
  - Total: 220
  - Density: 78/km^{2} (200/sq mi)
- Time zone: UTC+12 (NZST)
  - Summer (DST): UTC+13 (NZDT)
- Postcode: 7886
- Area code: 03
- Local iwi: Ngāi Tahu

Fox Glacier (Māori: Weheka), called Weheka until the 1940s, is a village on the West Coast of the South Island of New Zealand. The village is close to the eponymous Fox Glacier.

== Toponymy ==
The village was known as Weheka until the 1940s, when the name of the post office was changed to Fox Glacier, after the nearby glacier of the same name. The glacier was given the name of Fox Glacier in 1872 after a visit by then New Zealand premier, William Fox.

== History ==
The origins of the settlement lie 20 kilometres (12 mi) away, on the coast at Gillespies Beach, which underwent a gold rush in the 1860s. At that time, Gillespies was briefly the third-largest town on the West Coast. As the amount of gold being recovered declined, most of the population, including the Sullivan family of miners, moved on. Patrick Sullivan moved inland with his friend Fred Williams to try farming in an area known as the Weheka Valley. Julia Sullivan married Fred Williams in 1893 and built a farmhouse on the Cook River flats near the present site of the settlement. By the early 1900s large amounts of forest on the flats had been cleared and become farmland.

Access to the settlement was still via the sea: boats would land at Gillespies Beach, and goods were unloaded in the surf and carried by horse and dray back to Weheka. The road north to Waiho (now Franz Josef / Waiau) was very poor: surveyor Charlie Douglas wrote in the 1890s, "…when I came through that way, I left the track and took to the bush as being far better walking." By 1903 it had been improved and Dr Ebenezer Teichelmann described it as a good horse track.

In the 1920s Westland began to be marketed as a scenic wonderland for tourists. For years the Williams and Sullivan families had offered hospitality to tourists coming to see the glacier in their own homesteads, but in 1926 Mick and Jack Sullivan decided to build accommodation for the increasing numbers of visitors. They established a sawmill and built the Fox Glacier Hostel, which opened on 20 December 1928. It had its own hydroelectric power generator and was supplied by the Sullivan farm. It had 40 bedrooms, designed to accommodate up to 100 guests, as well as four parlours and a large dining room for up to 70 diners. The hotel became the centre of activity in the area, running trips to Lake Matheson where visitors could take a boat to photograph the lakes famous reflections. Horses were supplied to tourists who wanted to visit the remains of the gold-mining settlement at Gillespies Beach. Mary Kerr (née Sullivan) ran the hotel, and essentially all local tourism, from the 1950s until her death in 1986.

== Geography ==
=== Setting ===
Bruce Bay is 46 km (29 mi) to the south-west of the village, and Franz Josef / Waiau is 23 km (14 mi) north-east. State Highway 6 runs through the village. The village is 6 km (3.7 mi) from the eponymous Fox Glacier, and a similar distance from Lake Matheson.

Fox Glacier is primarily a service centre for tourists, although it also services the local farming community.

=== Climate ===
Climate data for Fox Glacier (1981–2010)
Month	Jan	Feb	Mar	Apr	May	Jun	Jul	Aug	Sep	Oct	Nov	Dec	Year
Mean daily maximum °C (°F)	19.0 (66.2)	19.9 (67.8)	18.5 (65.3)	16.1 (61.0)	13.9 (57.0)	11.9 (53.4)	11.5 (52.7)	12.3 (54.1)	13.6 (56.5)	14.5 (58.1)	16.3 (61.3)	17.9 (64.2)	15.5 (59.8)
Daily mean °C (°F)	14.7 (58.5)	15.2 (59.4)	13.9 (57.0)	11.6 (52.9)	9.3 (48.7)	7.3 (45.1)	6.7 (44.1)	7.6 (45.7)	9.1 (48.4)	10.3 (50.5)	11.9 (53.4)	13.7 (56.7)	10.9 (51.7)
Mean daily minimum °C (°F)	10.4 (50.7)	10.6 (51.1)	9.3 (48.7)	7.1 (44.8)	4.8 (40.6)	2.8 (37.0)	1.9 (35.4)	2.9 (37.2)	4.6 (40.3)	6.1 (43.0)	7.6 (45.7)	9.6 (49.3)	6.5 (43.7)
Average rainfall mm (inches)	585.9 (23.07)	322.1 (12.68)	482.6 (19.00)	312.0 (12.28)	336.4 (13.24)	393.5 (15.49)	370.3 (14.58)	377.9 (14.88)	343.8 (13.54)	565.3 (22.26)	368.5 (14.51)	549.9 (21.65)	5,008.2 (197.18)
Source: CliFlo

== Tourism ==
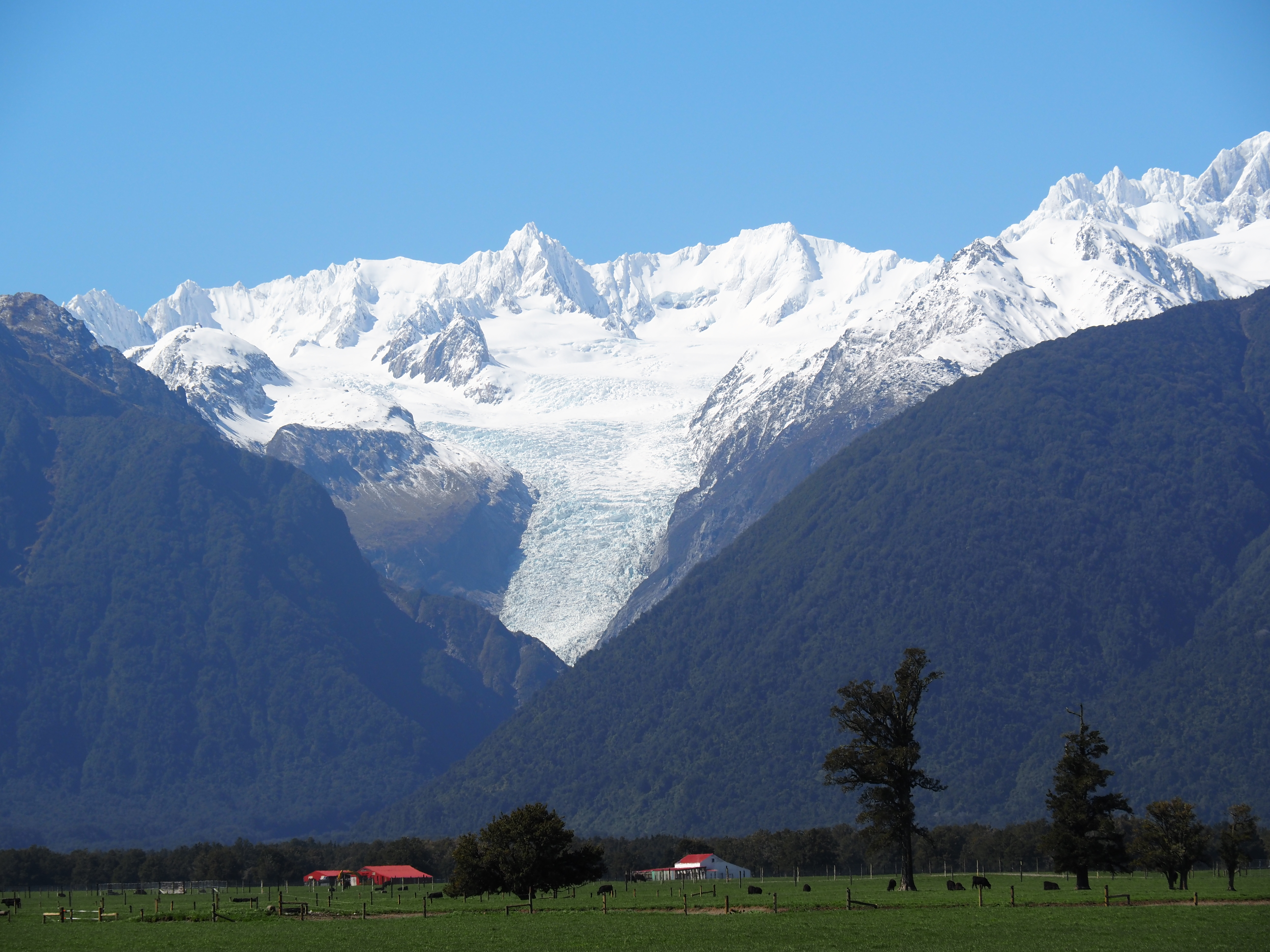
View of Fox Glacier from Te Kopikopiko o te Waka

The Fox Glacier is the main visitor attraction for the township. One of the access routes providing a view of the glacier is via the Fox Glacier South Side Walkway/Cycleway. This is a 6.4 km (4.0 mi) return trip along the south bank of the Fox River. The track begins 2 km (1.2 mi) south of the township at the Fox River, and passes through ancient podocarp forest, and passes across glacial moraines. The forest on the moraines shows a succession because of the differing ages of establishment of vegetation on the moraine surface. The Moraine Walk is a 4 km (2.5 mi) return walk that branches off the walkway/cycleway on the south side of the Fox River.

Other local attractions include:

- Te Kopikopiko o te Waka is a viewing point and cultural heritage site located 9 km (5.6 mi) to the west of the township. It provides panoramic views of the Southern Alps / Kā Tiritiri o te Moana and Fox Glacier. Te Kopikopiko o te Waka was developed in 2022 by Ngati Mahaki, in association with the Fox Glacier community, Heritage New Zealand and the Department of Conservation. The installations at the site tell a Ngāi Tahu creation story.
- The Minnehaha Walk is a 1.2 km (0.75 mi) loop walk through rata-podocarp forest alongside Carters Creek near the township. The track provides opportunities for viewing glowworms at night.
- The Te Weheka Walkway/Cycleway is a 5 km (3.1 mi) return track. The route goes from the township through bush to the north bank of the Fox River, and to a viewing point of the Alpine Gardens landslide. This landslide is approximately 50 million m³ in size and is one of the largest actively moving landslides in New Zealand. The Te Weheka Walkway/Cycleway won a national award in 2012 for the Best Cycle Facility Project.
- The Mt Fox route is a challenging day-climb to the Mt Fox trig point at 1,021 m (3,350 ft), with a further climb on a marked route through grassland to a summit at 1,345 m (4,413 ft). It begins from 3 km (1.9 mi) south of the township, on State Highway 6. The route is only suitable for well-equipped and experienced trampers.
- Gillespies Beach is a black sand beach and settlement located 20 km (12 mi) west of Fox Glacier township by road. The area was the site of a gold rush in the 1860s and gold dredging continued into the mid 20th century. There is a campsite, and a range of coastal walks in the area.
- Lake Matheson is a small glacial lake located around 5 km (3.1 mi) from the Fox Glacier township. The lake is known for its reflected views of Aoraki / Mount Cook and Mount Tasman. There is an easy 4.4 km (2.7 mi) walking track around the lake.
- The Lake Gault track is an 8 km (5.0 mi) return route that climbs 200 m (660 ft) through original podocarp forest to a lookout over a small glacial lake with views of the Southern Alps/Kā Tiritiri o te Moana, Aoraki / Mount Cook and Mount Tasman. The track starts from the Lake Matheson car park. It was re-opened in April 2019 after being closed for 20 years. The work on restoring the track was carried out mainly by volunteers, led by the Fox Glacier Community Development Society in association with the Department of Conservation. The track was upgraded in 2020, as part of initiatives to help encourage tourism and build economic resilience for the region.

== Demographics ==
Fox Glacier is described by Stats NZ as a rural settlement and covers 2.81 km^{2} (1.08 sq mi). It had an estimated population of 220 as of June 2025, with a population density of 78 people per km^{2}. The settlement is part of the larger Westland Glaciers-Bruce Bay statistical area.

Historical population
Year	Pop.	±% p.a.
2006	285	—
2013	282	−0.15%
2018	291	+0.63%
2023	189	−8.27%
The 2006 population is for a smaller area of 1.92 km^{2}. Source:

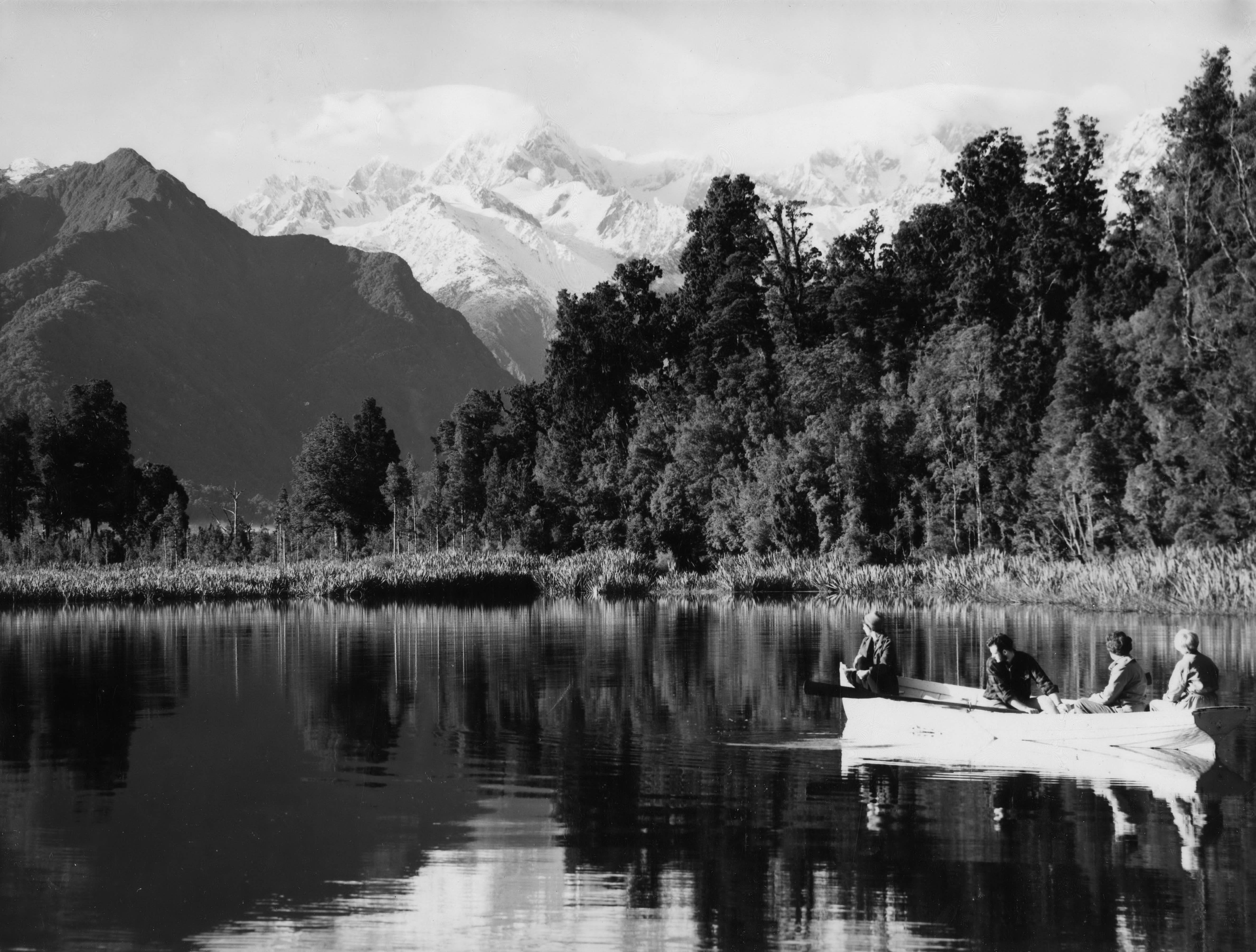
Tourists on Lake Matheson in 1965

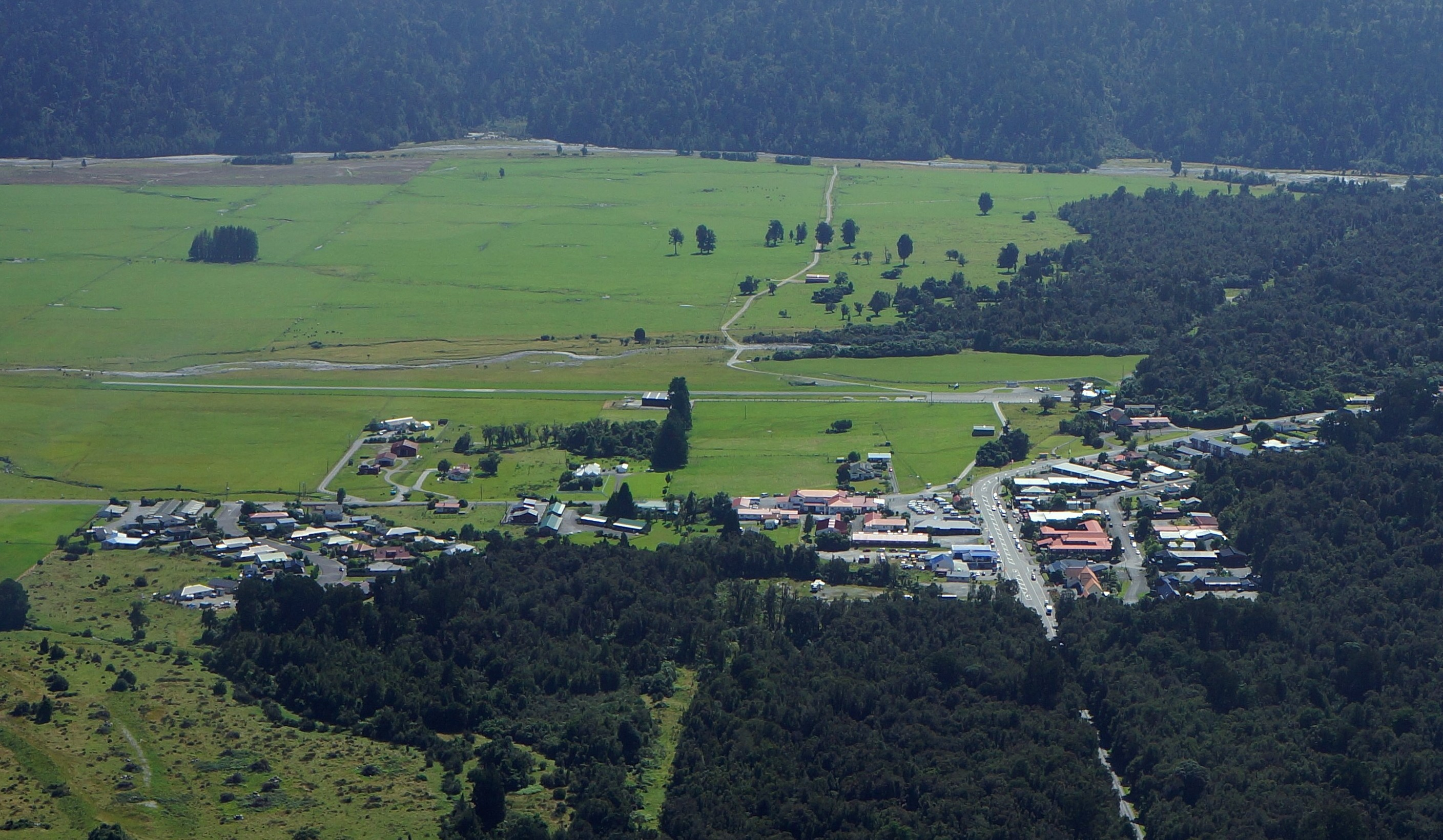
Fox Glacier from the south, 2011

Fox Glacier had a population of 189 in the 2023 New Zealand census, a decrease of 102 people (−35.1%) since the 2018 census, and a decrease of 93 people (−33.0%) since the 2013 census. There were 96 males and 90 females in 105 dwellings. 3.2% of people identified as LGBTIQ+. The median age was 39.0 years (compared with 38.1 years nationally). There were 18 people (9.5%) aged under 15 years, 39 (20.6%) aged 15 to 29, 105 (55.6%) aged 30 to 64, and 27 (14.3%) aged 65 or older.

People could identify as more than one ethnicity. The results were 73.0% European (Pākehā); 7.9% Māori; 6.3% Pasifika; 11.1% Asian; 4.8% Middle Eastern, Latin American and African New Zealanders (MELAA); and 3.2% other, which includes people giving their ethnicity as "New Zealander". English was spoken by 95.2%, Māori by 3.2%, Samoan by 6.3%, and other languages by 15.9%. No language could be spoken by 1.6% (e.g. too young to talk). The percentage of people born overseas was 39.7, compared with 28.8% nationally.

Religious affiliations were 34.9% Christian, 1.6% Māori religious beliefs, and 3.2% Buddhist. People who answered that they had no religion were 49.2%, and 9.5% of people did not answer the census question.

Of those at least 15 years old, 36 (21.1%) people had a bachelor's or higher degree, 81 (47.4%) had a post-high school certificate or diploma, and 57 (33.3%) people exclusively held high school qualifications. The median income was $35,100, compared with $41,500 nationally. 6 people (3.5%) earned over $100,000 compared to 12.1% nationally. The employment status of those at least 15 was 120 (70.2%) full-time and 18 (10.5%) part-time.

== Transport and infrastructure ==
State Highway 6 passes through the town. The village is served by the Fox Glacier Aerodrome.

Westpower owns and operates the local distribution network in Fox Glacier. Electricity is supplied from the national grid at Hokitika via Westpower's 146-kilometre-long (91 mi) 33 kV line from Hokitika. Manawa Energy owns the 3 MW Wahapo hydroelectric power station, 20 km (12 mi) north of Franz Josef. This station can operate islanded and provide supply to the local region if the supply from the north is lost. New Zealand Energy owns a small 500 kW hydro generation scheme using water from Lake Gault. This scheme was originally built to supply a dredge at Gillespies Beach.

The Westland District Council owns and operates reticulated water and wastewater systems in the town.

== Churches ==
=== Our Lady of the Snows ===
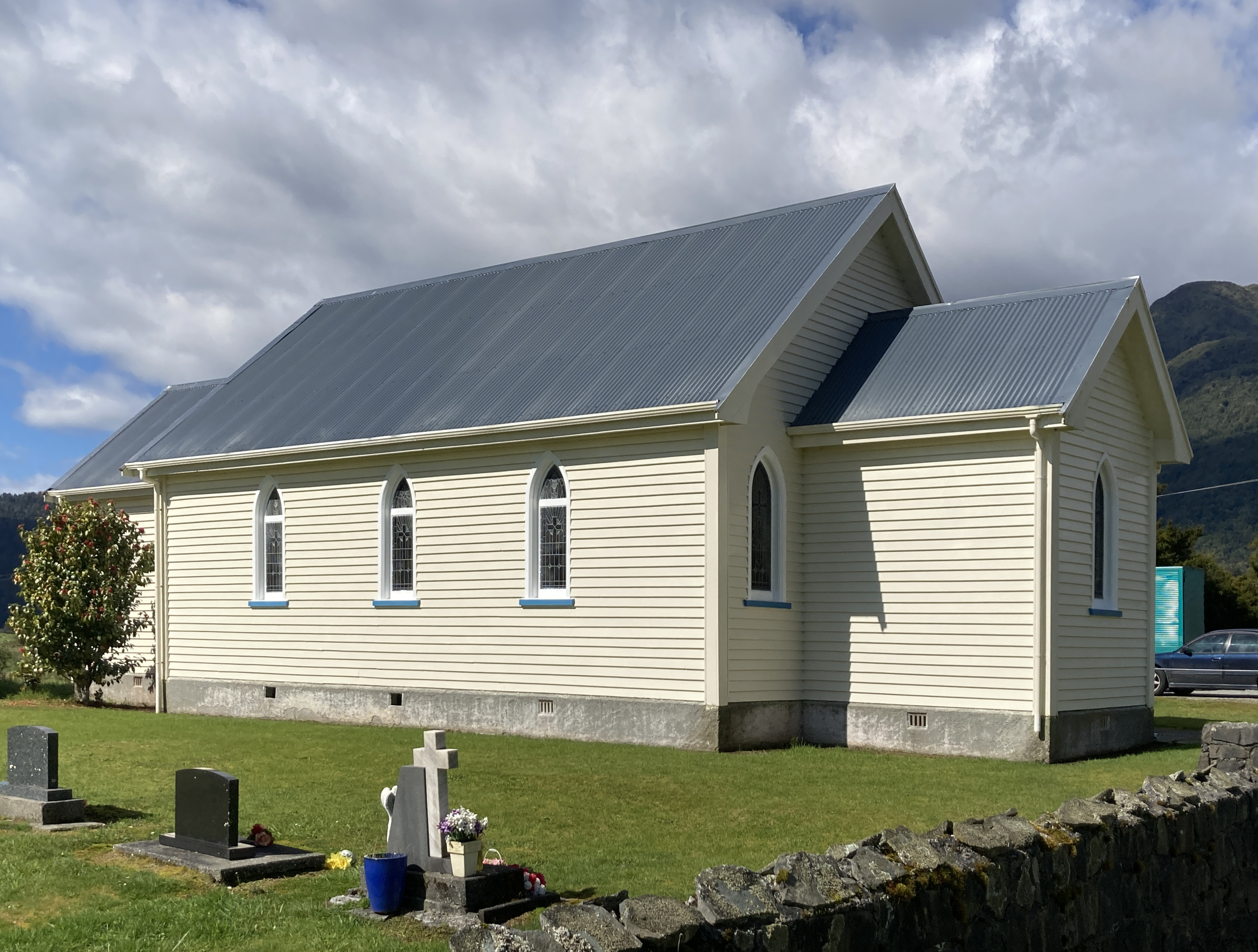
Our Lady of the Snows in 2020

Our Lady of the Snows is a Catholic church located at 60 Cook Flat Road, Fox Glacier, within the South Westland parish of Our Lady of the Woods. The wooden church was built in three months, at a cost of £690, by Robert Emmett Clarke of Whataroa, and includes stained-glass windows and statues donated by settlers in the area in memory of deceased relatives. The Bishop of Christchurch, Matthew Brodie, laid the foundation stone on 22 April 1934, and the church was blessed and dedicated on 15 September 1935 by Bishop Brodie.

Mass is held at Our Lady of the Snows twice monthly, on the second and fourth Sundays.

=== Douglas Memorial Church ===
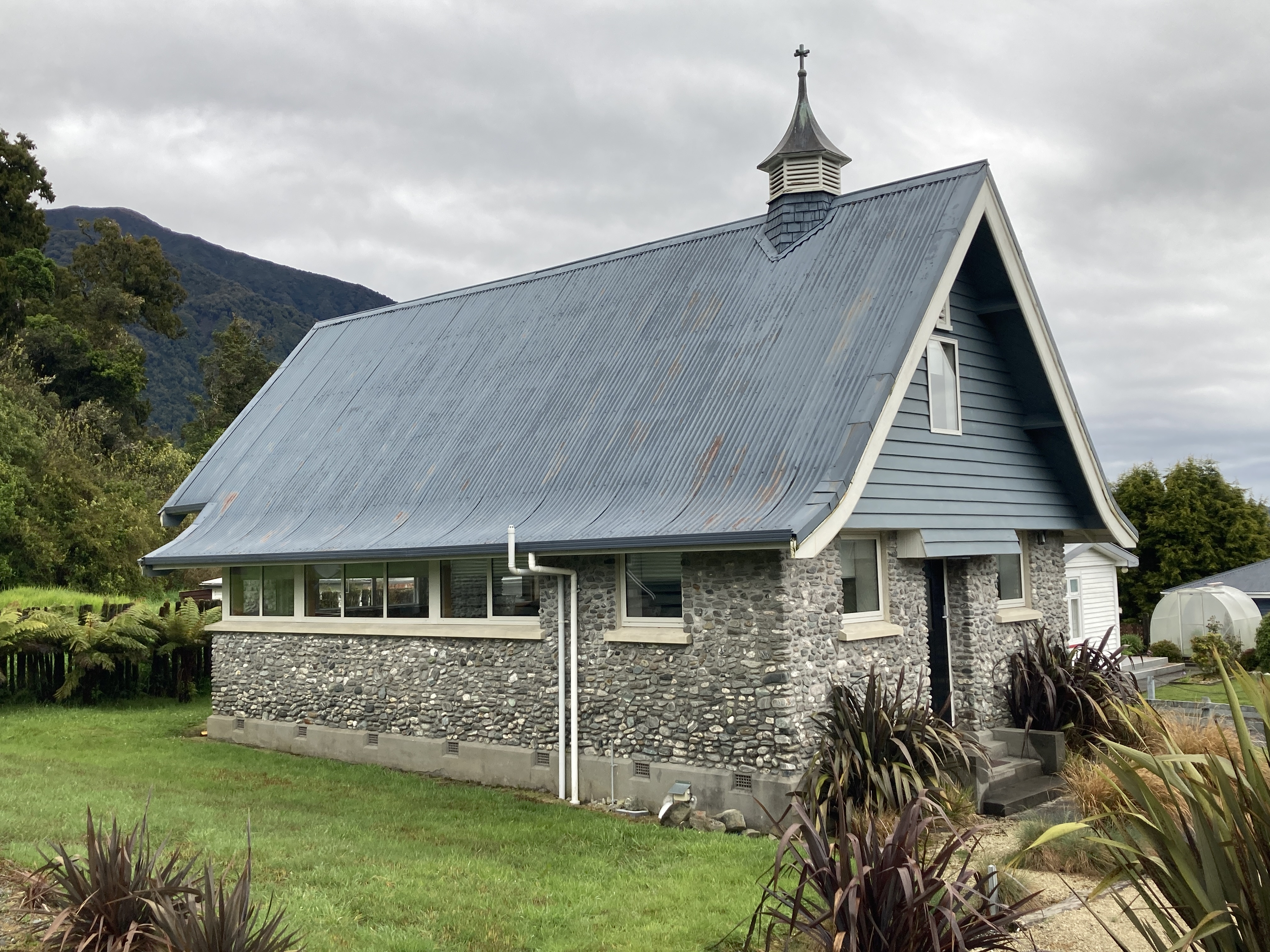
Former Douglas Memorial Church in 2020

The Douglas Memorial Church was a small Presbyterian church at 5 Main Road, Fox Glacier, built by the Hokitika firm of Goodfellow and Bennett in 1952 from local stone and rimu. A reduction in the number of parishioners saw the church put up for sale in 2012, and it was subsequently converted into self-catering holiday accommodation, The Church at Fox, opening in 2015.

The church was named in honour of the Reverend William Douglas (c. 1837–1920), who was the Presbyterian minister in Hokitika between 1881 and 1907, and served as moderator of the General Assembly in New Zealand in 1882.

== Education ==
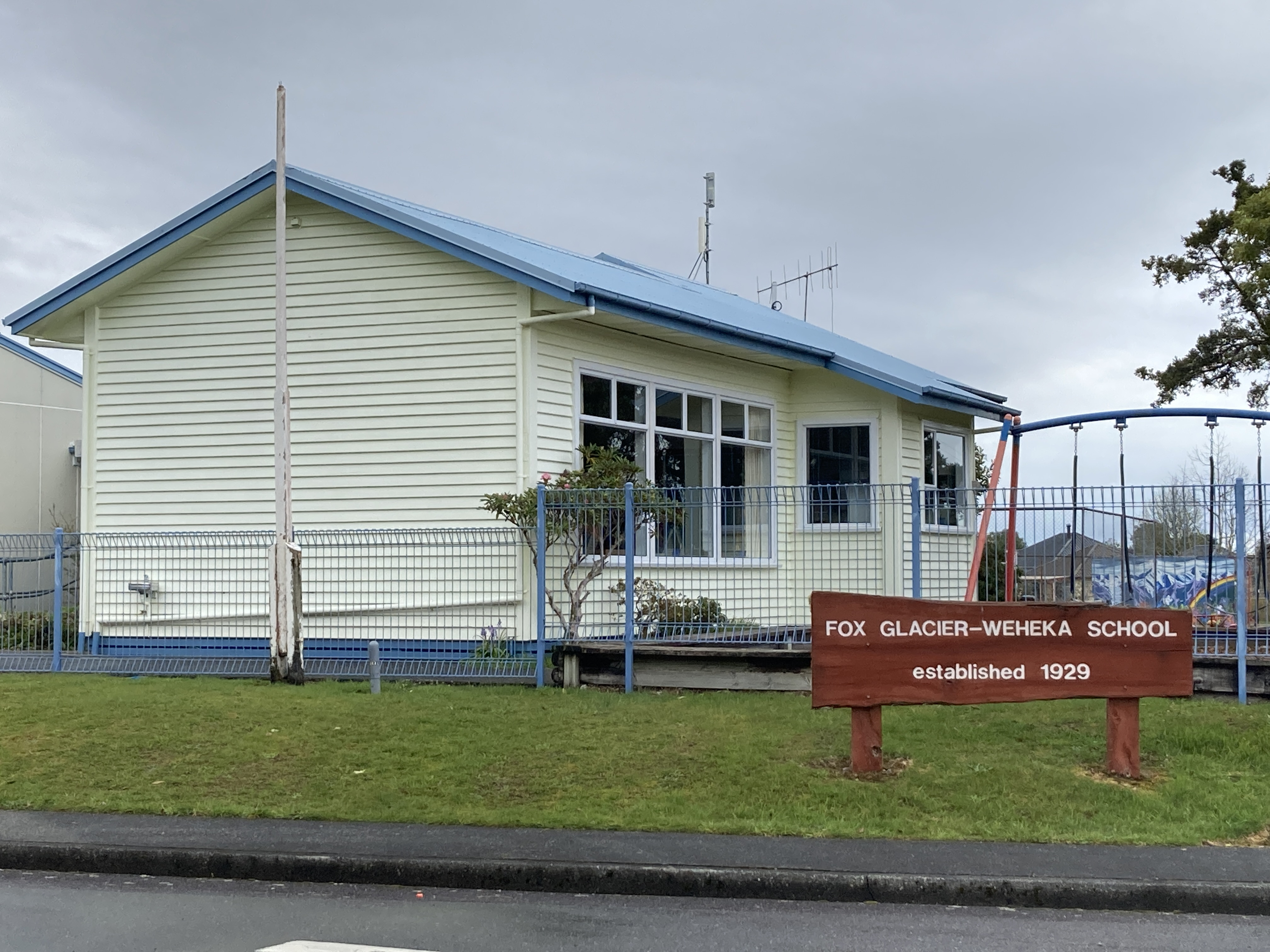
Fox Glacier Weheka School

The first school in the area, Gillespies Beach School, opened in 1877, and with the declining population of the settlement closed in 1900. For the next 30 years children were educated in household schools, until the opening of Weheka School in 1929.

This became Fox Glacier School, now also called Fox Glacier Weheka School. It is the only school in Fox Glacier, with a roll of 5 (as of July 2026). students from Years 1 to 8 (ages 5 to 12). The nearest secondary school to Fox Glacier is South Westland Area School, 85 km (53 mi) away in Hari Hari.

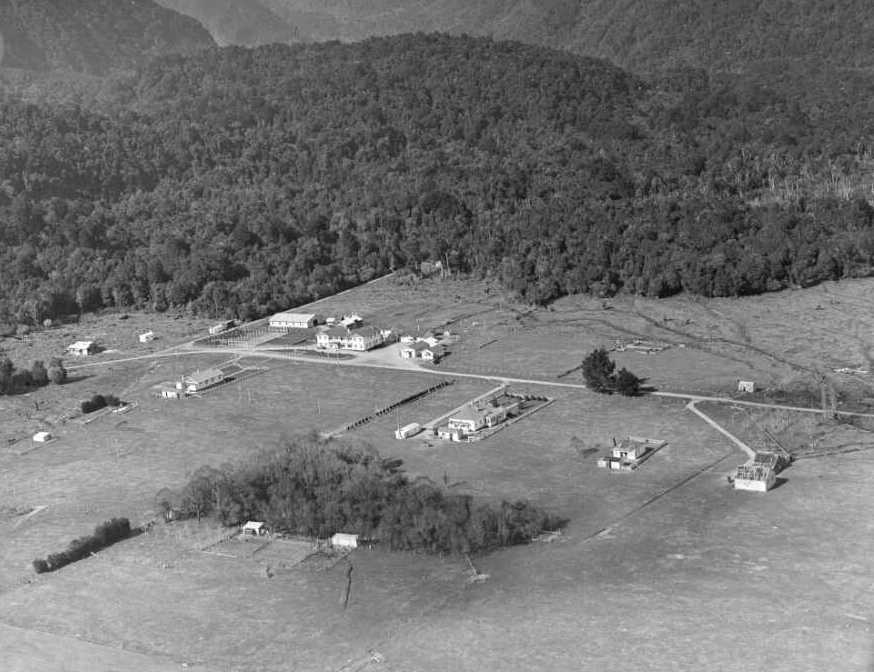
Weheka from the north, 1935
