= Kisejärve Lakes =

Group of lakes in Estonia

Coordinates: 57°38′N 27°12′E

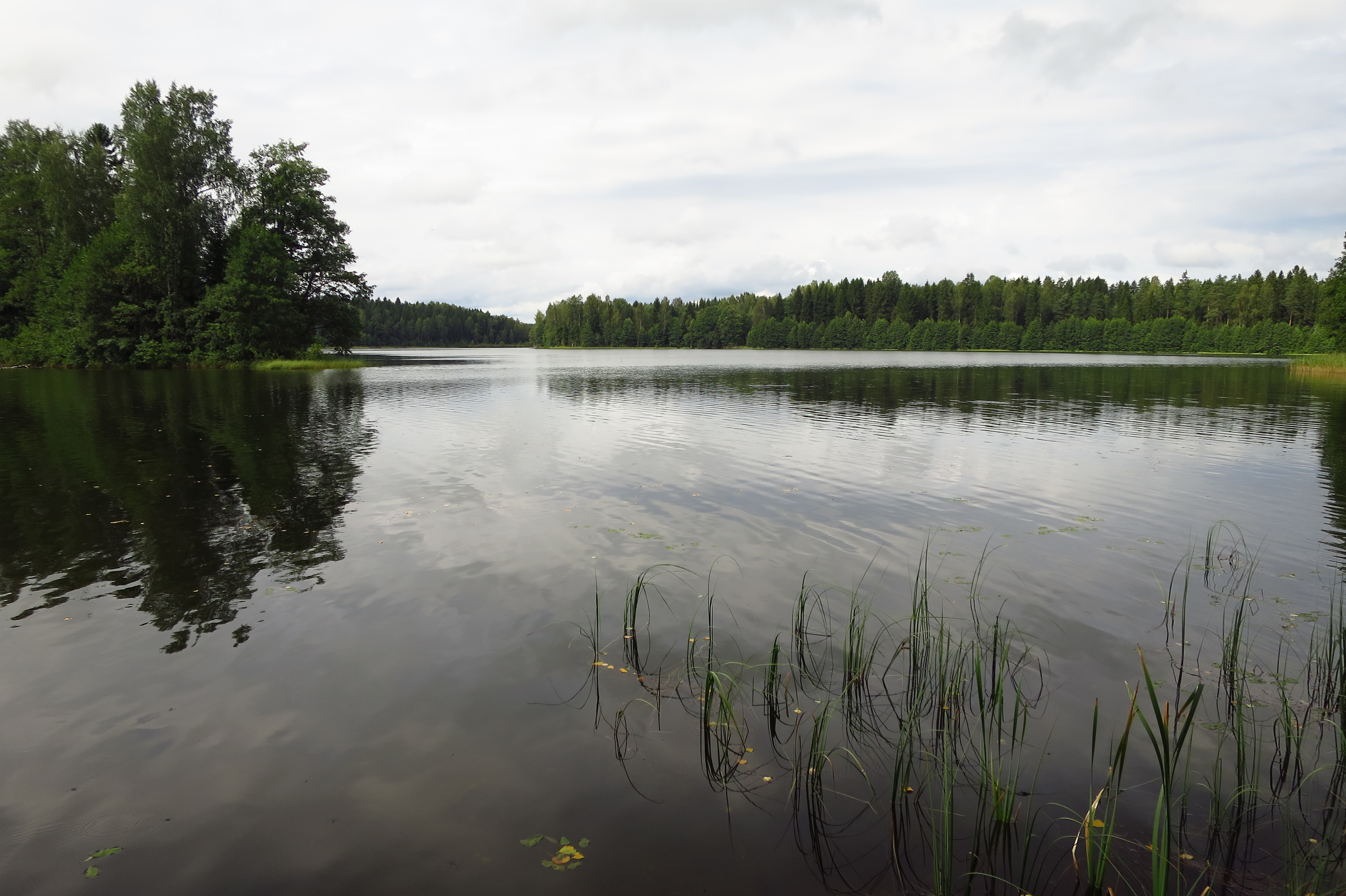
Kisõjärv

The Kisejärve Lakes (Estonian: Kisejärve järvestik) are a group of lakes in Rõuge Parish, Võru County, Estonia. The group consists of seven lakes that in limnological sense are semi-dystrophic or oligotropic.

The lakes are:

- Kisõjärv, Kisejärv, Kiisajärv, Kisi järv, or Küsajärv (44.3 ha, depth up to 5.1 m)
- Kõrbjärv, Rõuge Kõrbjärv, or Kirbujärv (1.4 ha)
- Laihjärv or Luikjärv (3.8 ha, depth up to 3 m)
- Mägialonõ järv, Madaljärv, Medaljärv, Mägialuse järv, or Mägialune järv (1.8 ha)
- Pahijärv (8.3 ha)
  - Lõuna-Pahijärv (3.9 ha)
  - Põhja-Pahijärv (4.4 ha, depth up to 2 m)
- Sõdaalonõ järv, Sõdaalune järv, Sedaljärv, Sõdaaluse järv, or Söödialune järv (7.1 ha)
- Vuuhjärv, Vuhjärv, or Laihjärv (1.5 ha)

At the time of the last glacial age, these lakes were not separated.

The lakes and their surroundings are under protection as the Kisejärv Landscape Conservation Area.
