= Thylacosceles acridomima =

Scientific classification
- Kingdom: Animalia
- Phylum: Arthropoda
- Clade: Pancrustacea
- Class: Insecta
- Order: Lepidoptera
- Family: Stathmopodidae
- Genus: Thylacosceles
- Species: T. acridomima

Binomial name
- Thylacosceles acridomima Meyrick, 1889

Synonyms
- Stathmopoda epichlora Meyrick, 1889; Pachyrhabda epichlora (Meyrick, 1889); Calicotis epichlora (Meyrick, 1889)

Species of moth endemic to New Zealand

Thylacosceles acridomima, also known as the pūniu spore-eater or the micro-featherfoot, is a moth of the family Stathmopodidae. It was first described by Edward Meyrick in 1889. This species is endemic to New Zealand and has been observed in the North and South Islands. T. acridomima frequents dense native forest habitat where it can be very abundant. Larvae feed on the spores of the fern Polystichum vestitum. Adults are on the wing from October until January. The adult male is a dull blackish-grey while the female is more brownish-grey in colour.

== Taxonomy ==
T. acridomima was first described by Edward Meyrick in 1889. Also in 1889, Meyrick, thinking he was describing a new species, named this moth Stathmopoda epichlora. Meyrick subsequently placed S. epichlora in the genus Pachyrhabda. George Hudson discussed and illustrated T. acridomima in his 1928 book The butterflies and moths of New Zealand. Hudson also discussed Pachyrhabda epichlora in that publication. In 1988 John S. Dugdale synonymised P. epichlora into T. acridomima as the female paralectotypes of P. epichlora match Hudson's illustration of the female T. acridomima and the female specimens of T. aridomima in Hudson's collection are identical to the female lectotype of P. epichlora.

The male holotype of T. acridomimia, collected at the Wellington Botanic Garden in January by Meyrick, is held at the Natural History Museum, London.

Hudson regarded the epithet as apt as the hind-legs of the adult of this species bear a striking superficial resemblance to those of a grasshopper.

== Description ==
The mature larva of this species is between 5 and 6 mm long and is short and fat with a whitish flesh coloured body and pale brown head.

Meyrick described the adult male of this species as follows:

♂. 11mm. Head and palpi light yellowish-ochreous. Antennae whitish-fuscous, base yellowish. Thorax fuscous. Abdomen grey. Anterior legs dark fuscous; middle legs ochreous-yellowish; posterior legs ochreous- whitish, tibiae with a black apical ring, and tuft of posterior half dark grey. Forewings elongate, very narrow, broadest near base, long-pointed; fuscous, somewhat unevenly shaded, but without markings : cilia light fuscous. Hindwings fuscous-grey; cilia light fuscous.

Hudson described the male and female of the species as follows:

The expansion of the wings is considerably over 3/8 inch. The fore-wings are very elongate, broadest near the base, with the apex long-pointed, dull blackish-grey in the male and brownish-grey in the female, darker towards the apex; there is a very indistinct discal spot at about 3/4. The hind-wings and cilia are grey. The very conspicuous tuft of hairs on the tibia of the hind-legs is slaty-blue, the spurs and bristles at the end of the tibia being pale ochreous. The hind-wings and all the cilia are grey.

This species is larger and lighter in colour than it's sister species T. radians.

== Distribution ==
This species is endemic to New Zealand. It has been observed in the North and South Islands. It can be very abundant.

== Habitat and hosts ==
Larval host Polystichum vestitum.

This species frequents dense native forest. The larval host is Polystichum vestitum. The larvae feed on the spores of this fern.

== Behaviour ==
The larvae of this species create a silk tunnel on the underside of fronds of their host species. The adults of this species are on the wing from October to January. When at rest, the adult holds its wings flat and slightly extended from the body, with the tips divergent. The antennae are placed backwards on the top of the wings. The moth stands on its fore- and hind-legs, with the hind-legs being drawn forwards with the thickened hairy tibiae projecting beyond the costal margin. The stance helps break up the margin and helps the adult moth to resemble a small blackish lichen.

== Gallery ==
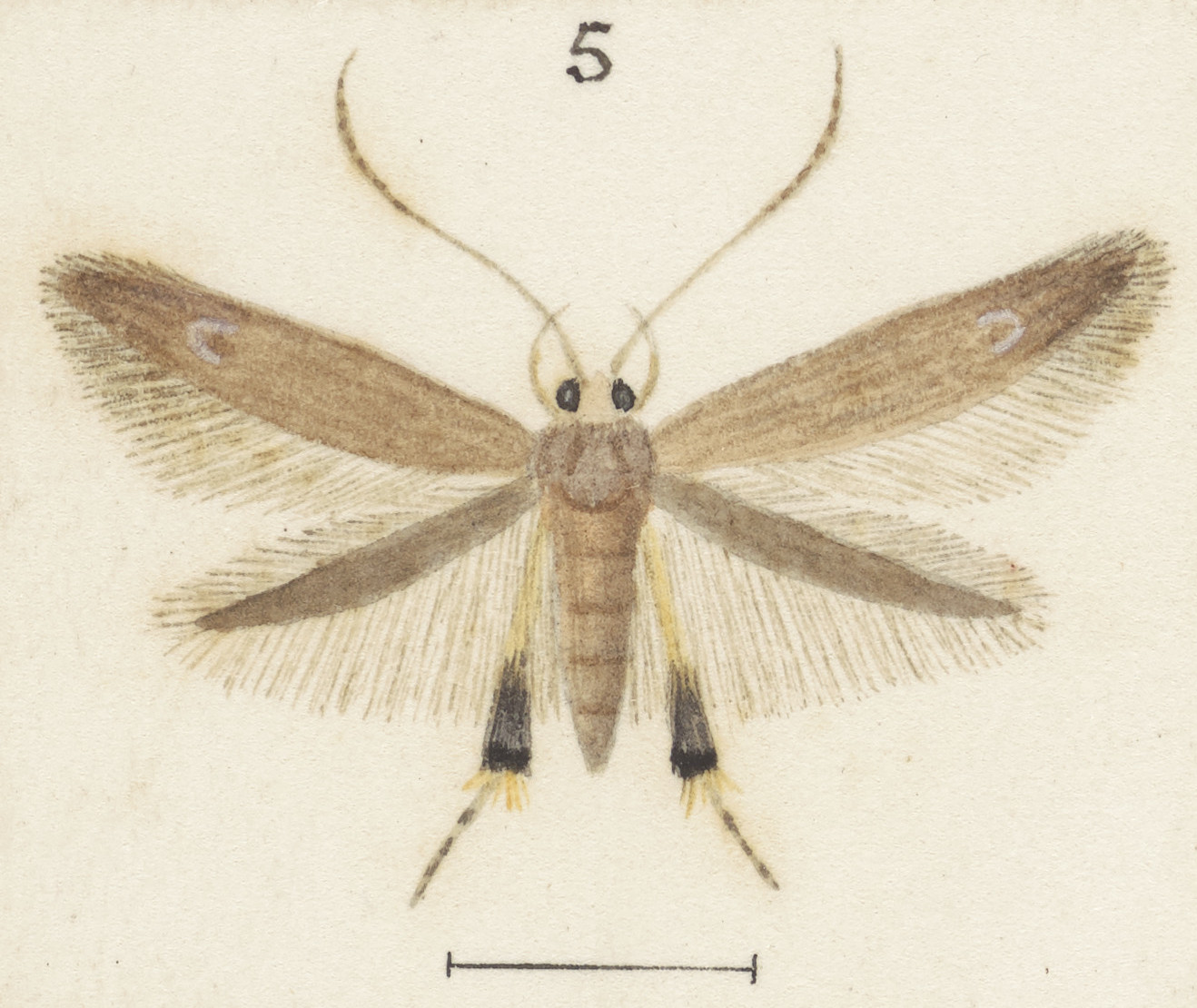
Hudson's illustration of female

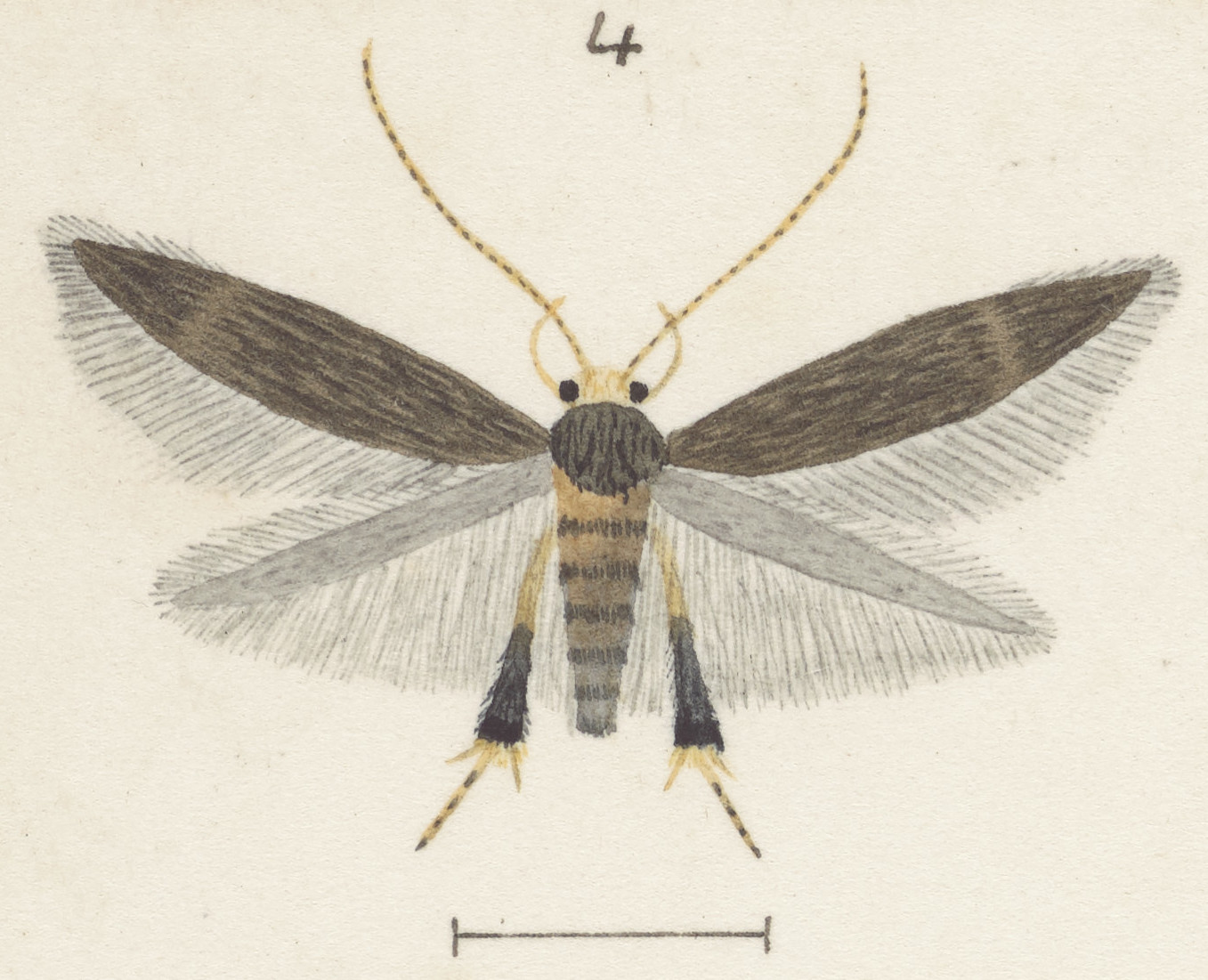
Hudson's Illustration of male

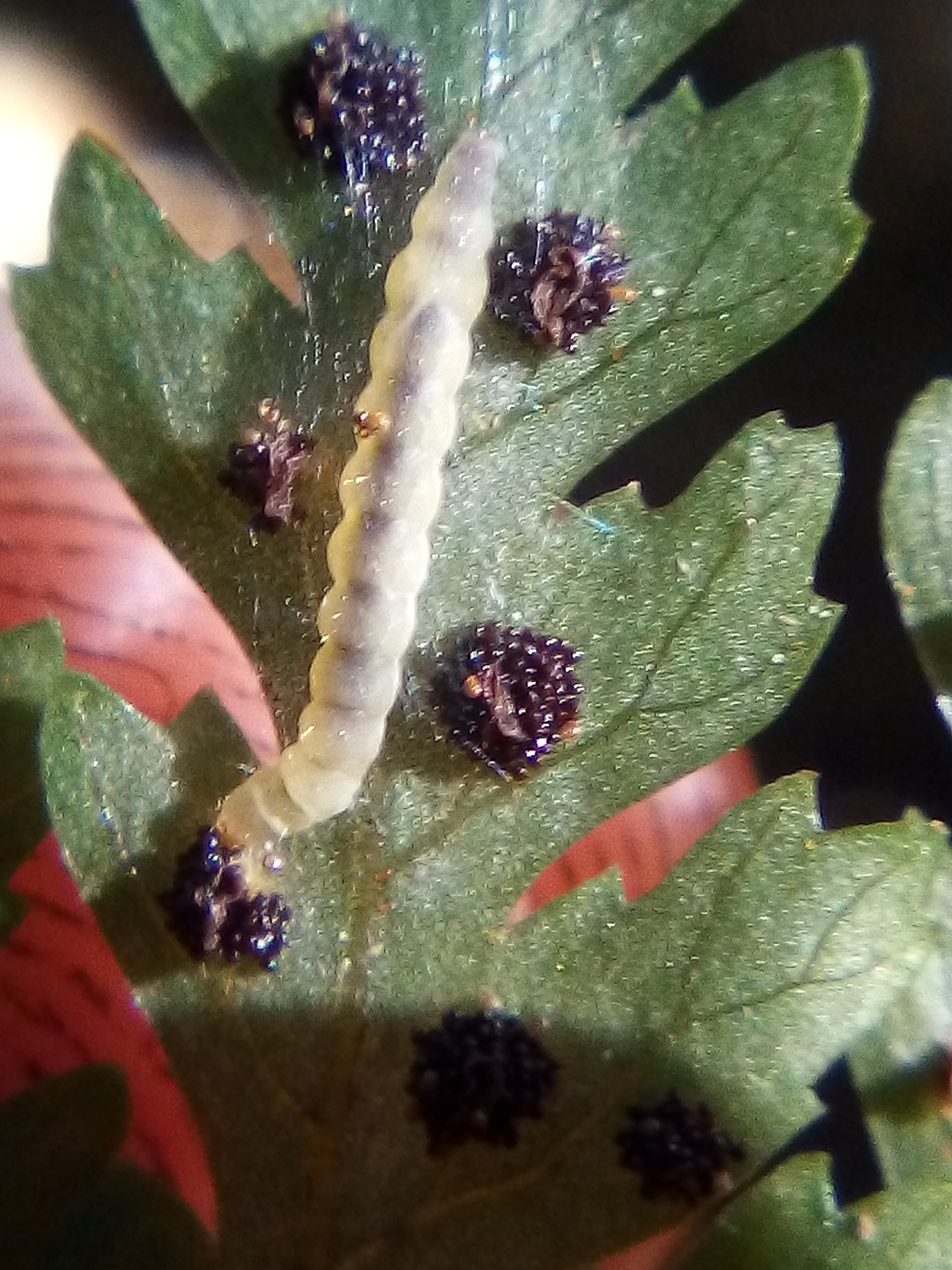
Larva

Adult
