= Lake Matheson =

Lake in New Zealand

- Te Ara Kairaumati (Māori)
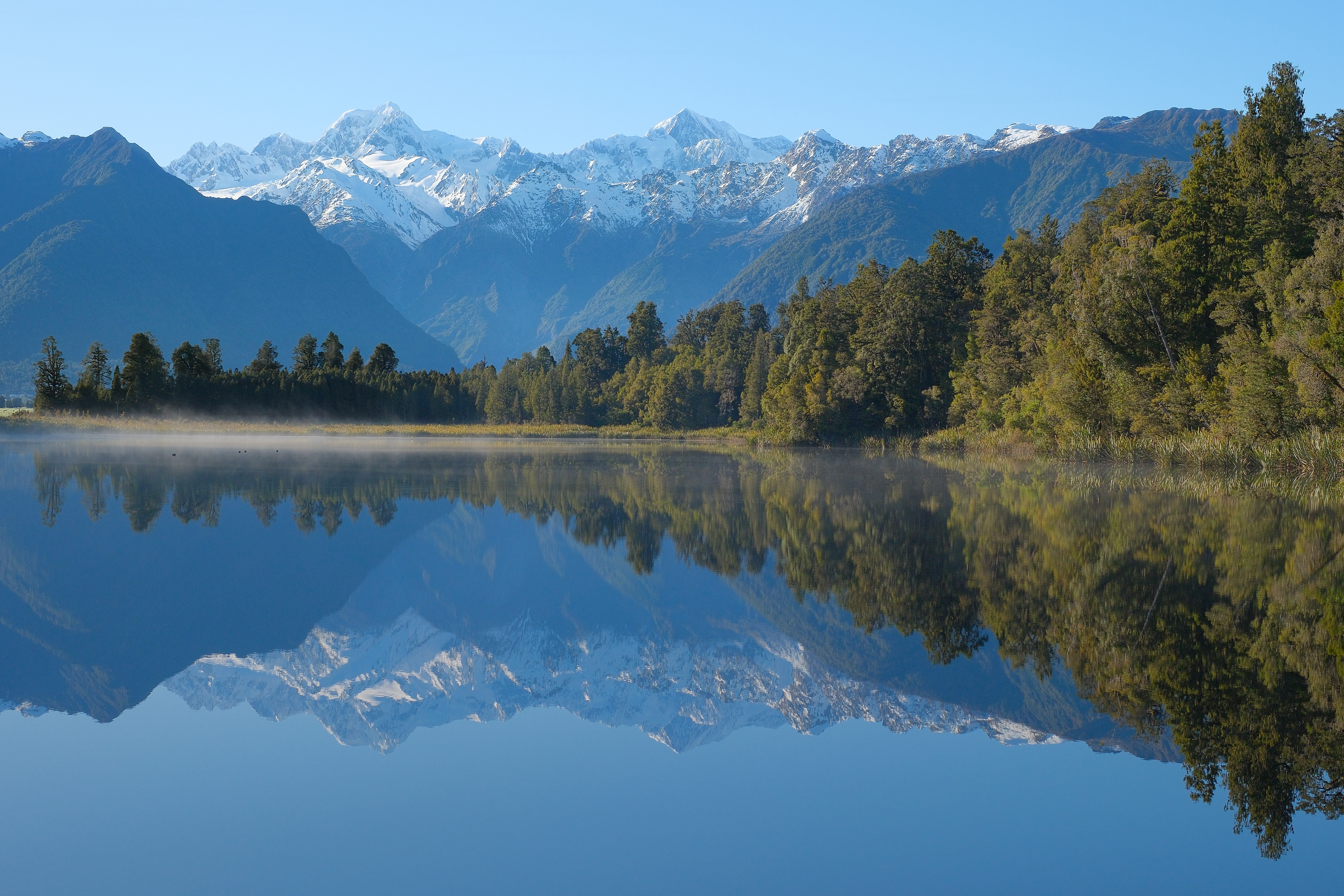
- Lake Matheson

- Location within New Zealand
- Interactive map of Lake Matheson
- Location: Fox Glacier, West Coast, South Island
- Coordinates: 43°26′17″S 169°57′47″E
- Type: Monomictic dystrophic
- Etymology: Local farmer Murdoch Matheson
- Surface area: 30 ha (74 acres)
- Average depth: 12 m (39 ft)
- Shore length^{1}: 1.5 km (0.93 mi)
- Surface elevation: 100 m (330 ft)
- ^{1} Shore length is not a well-defined measure.

Lake Matheson (Māori: Te Ara Kairaumati) is a small glacial lake in South Westland, New Zealand, near the township of Fox Glacier. It was a traditional food-gathering place for local Māori. An easy walking track circles the lake, which is famous for its reflected views of Aoraki / Mount Cook and Mount Tasman.

== Geography ==
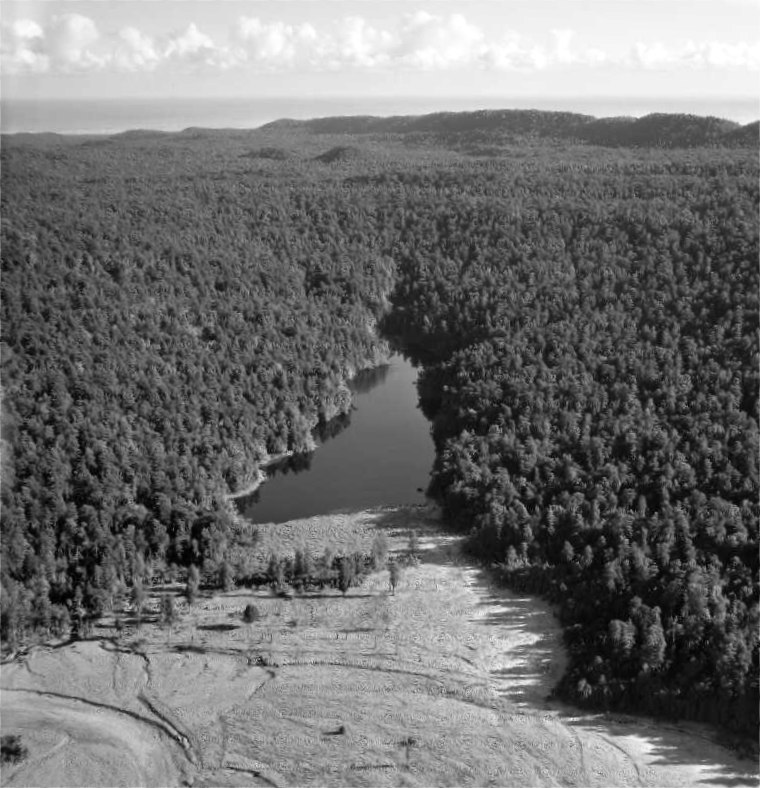
Aerial photo of Lake Matheson from the south-east, 1960

Lake Matheson formed between two moraine terraces left by the rapid retreat of Fox Glacier / Te Moeka o Tuawe 14,000 years ago, at the end of the last glacial period. The retreating glacier left behind a valley and a huge slab of ice insulated by a deep layer of moraine gravel, which gradually melted and collapsed to form the lake bed. The lake is now about 12 kilometres (7.5 mi) from the current terminus of the glacier in the Southern Alps. Moraines, outwash gravels, and river gravels dammed the valley, and the lake grew, fed by small streams and seepage – there is no major river inflow or outflow.

Lake Matheson is 30 ha in area, with an approximately 1.5 km shoreline and an average depth of 12 m. The streams that feed it pass through dense native bush, and often accumulate foam after heavy rains. They carry organic matter and tannins from the forest, which colour the water a dark brown – this is the factor that limits visibility and enhances the mirroring effect from the lake. The lake water is acidic (the pH has been recorded as low as 5.5), low in nutrients, and sometimes almost de-oxygenated. These are all characteristics of a dystrophic brown-water lake that is accumulating organic matter; in the long run, the lake will gradually fill in and become a peat bog.

== History ==
Te Ara Kairaumati was traditionally a mahinga kai (food-gathering place) for Māori people travelling along the coast to collect pounamu. They would stop at the lake to catch longfin eels or waterbirds. The lake was named Lake Matheson by the first European settlers on the Cook River flats after Murdoch Matheson, a cattle farmer in the area in the 1870s.

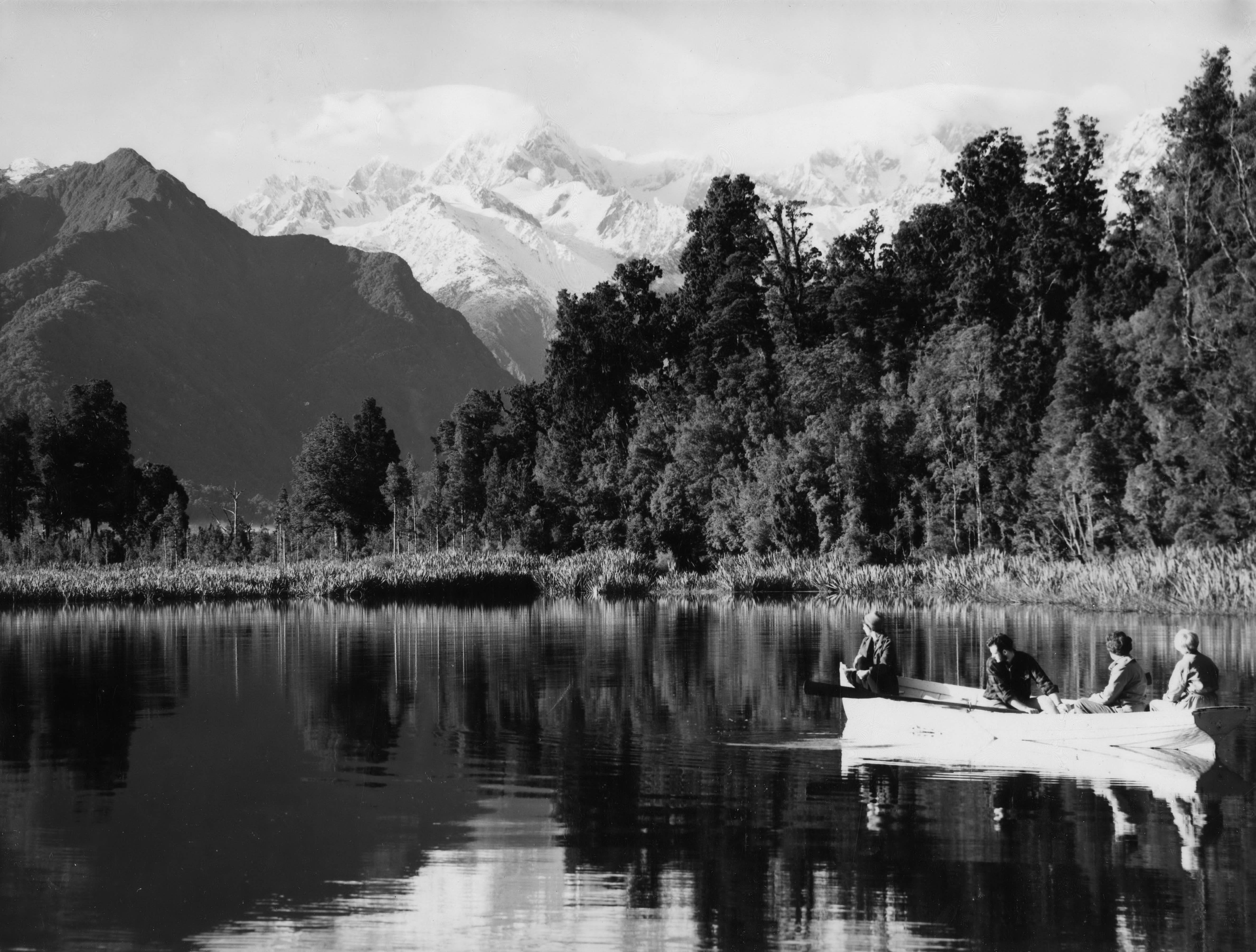
Boating on Lake Matheson, 1965

Since the rise of a New Zealand tourism industry in the early 20th century, the lake has become a popular destination for its reflections of the Southern Alps. The view includes the peaks of Mount Haast, La Perouse, and New Zealand's highest peaks, Aoraki / Mount Cook and Mount Tasman. The reflections are most visible at dawn or dusk, and the best views are in the early morning of a calm clear day, before wind disturbs the water surface or clouds form on the peaks.

From the 1950s an early-morning excursion to the lake was offered by the nearby Fox Glacier Hotel; visitors would be taken by bus to the present trailhead, and embark on a 15-minute walk through the bush, without the benefit of today's bridges and tracks. This led to a rowboat, in which they were taken out to Reflection Island to wait for the ripples to subside and the famous view to appear.

The iconic view across the lake became a much-reproduced image, featured on chocolate boxes, beer bottles, calendars, and souvenirs. Lake Matheson is now one of New Zealand's most photographed lakes.

=== Postage stamps ===
Views of Lake Matheson have featured as part of at least five New Zealand postage stamp issues.

- An engraving of the view was used on a ½d stamp entitled "Peace and Tranquility", in the 1946 New Zealand "Peace" issue, to commemorate the end of World War Two.
- A photograph of the view was used on the 45c stamp in the 1983 "Beautiful New Zealand" scenic stamp issue.
- One of the six different 40c self-adhesive definitive stamps issued in 1996 in dispenser boxes in coils of 100 stamps showed a photograph of Lake Matheson. The stamp was reissued in 1998 in booklet format, and again in 2000 in coil format.
- A photographic view of the lake formed the background for a $3.50 miniature sheet issued by New Zealand Post in 2001 to commemorate the Philanippon '01 Japan World Stamp Exhibition.
- In 2012, a photograph of the lake was used on the $3.50 denomination of the scenic definitive issue, in both self-adhesive and gummed forms.

== Walk ==
The area around Lake Matheson is managed as part of Westland Tai Poutini National Park by the Department of Conservation (DOC), who maintain walking tracks and access to popular viewing lookouts around the lake. An easy 2.6 km walking track circles the lake, beginning and ending at the Matheson Cafe about 5 km from Fox Glacier township. The track crosses a suspension bridge over the Clearwater River, and leads to several viewing spots, notably at the far end of the lake the "View of Views" and Reflection Island. It takes about 1½ hours return. The first 20 minutes of the walk, to the Jetty Viewpoint, is wheelchair-navigable and leads to a pontoon jetty that stretches out into the lake.

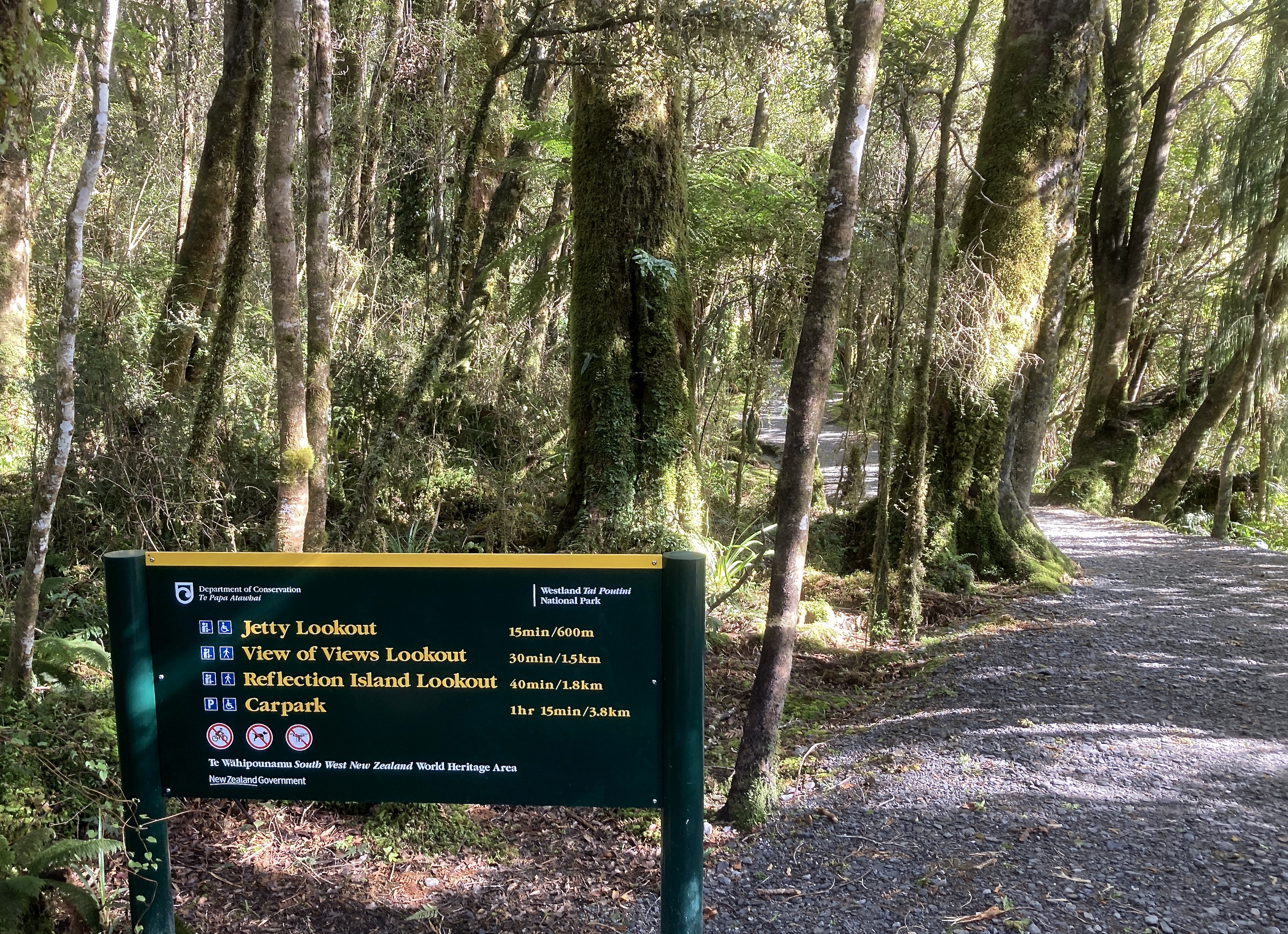

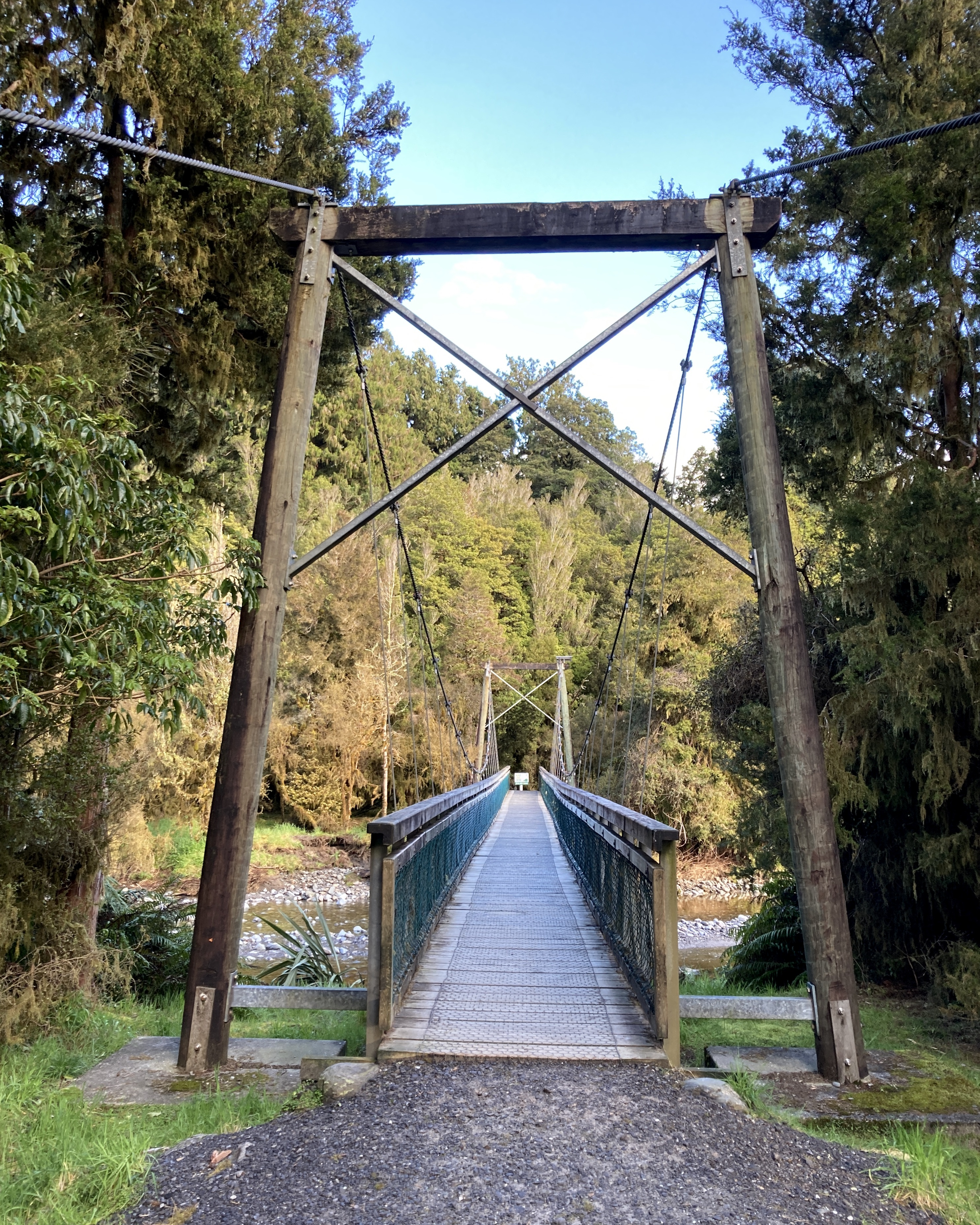
Swingbridge

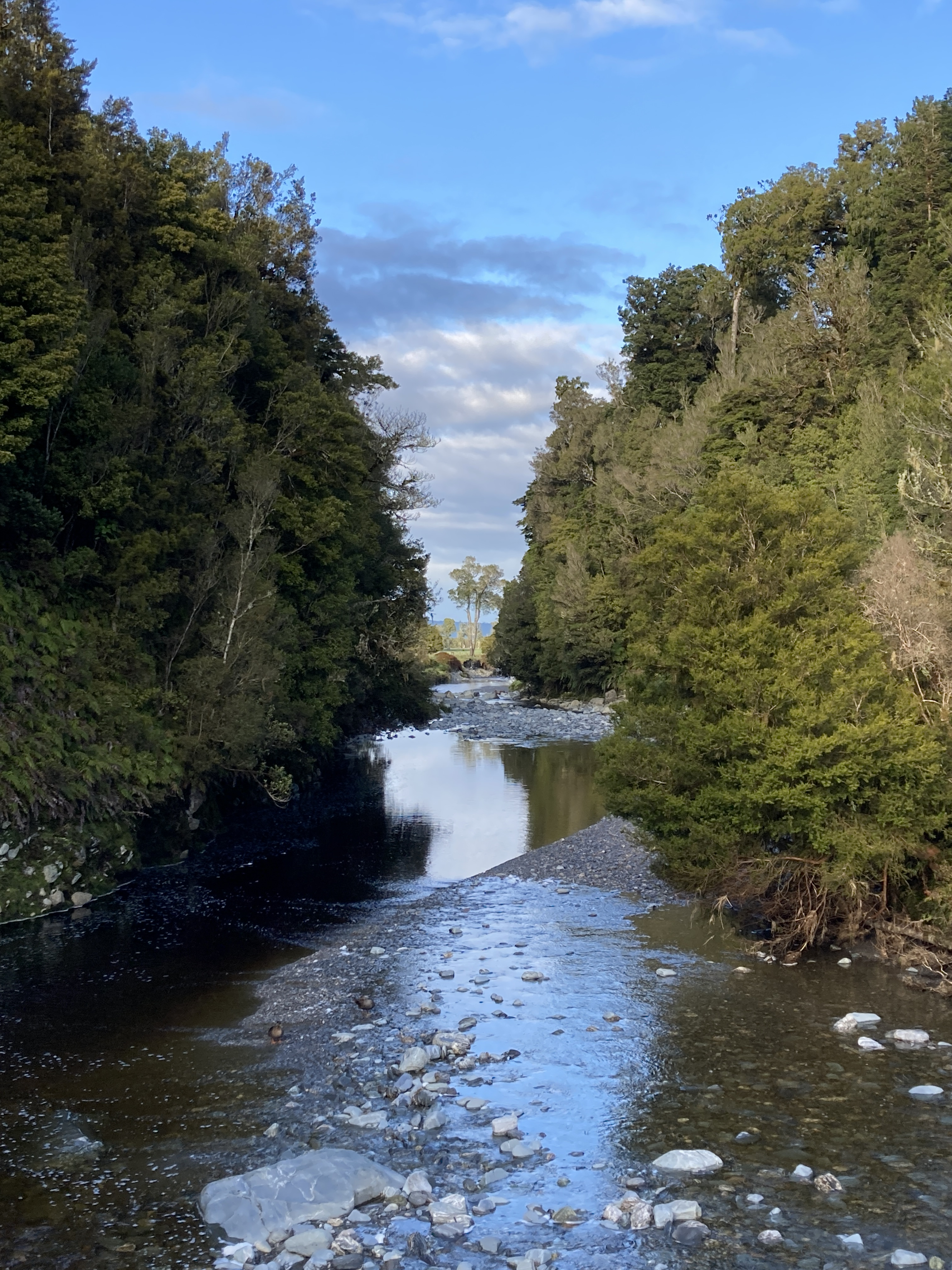
Clearwater River

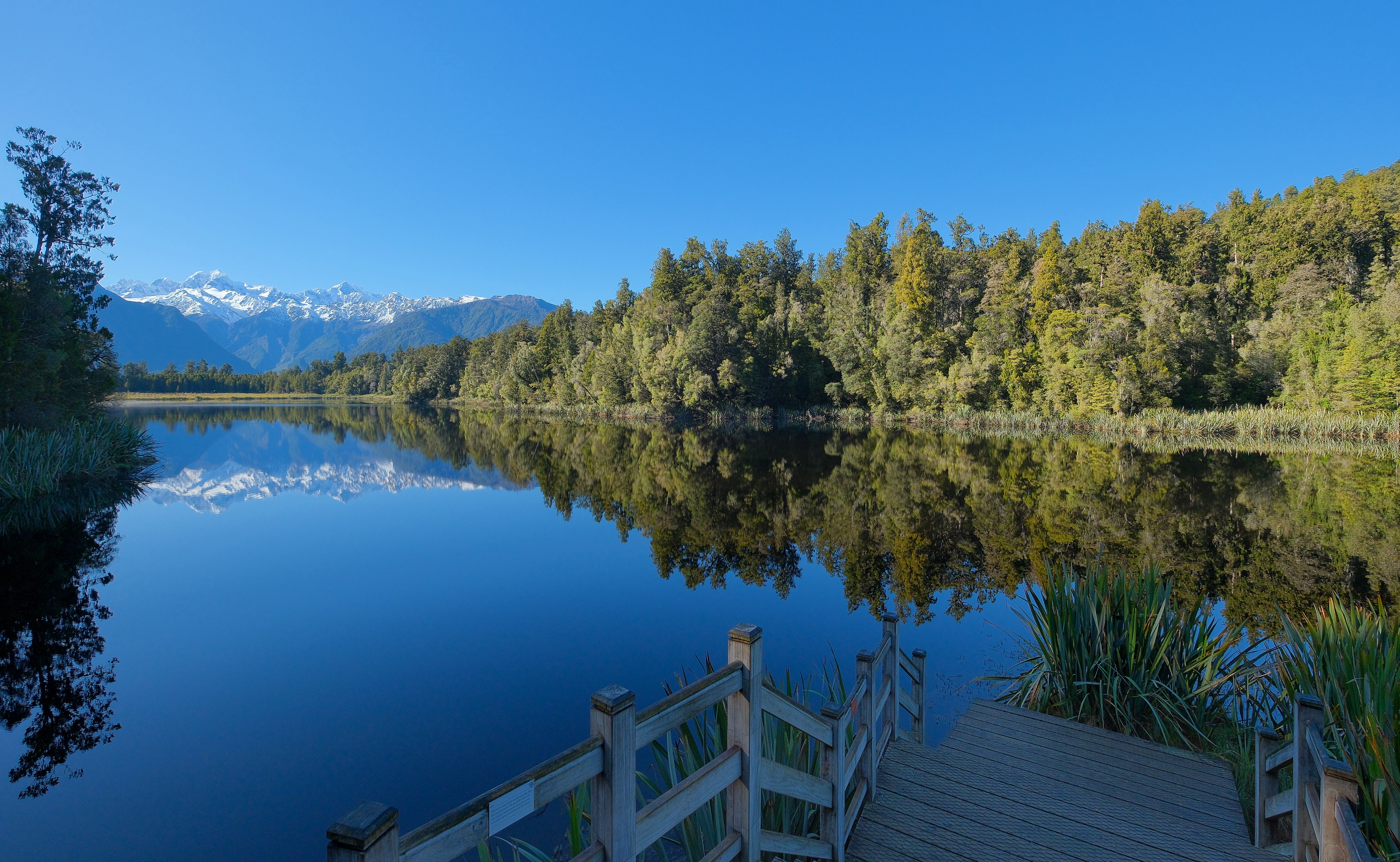
Reflection Island

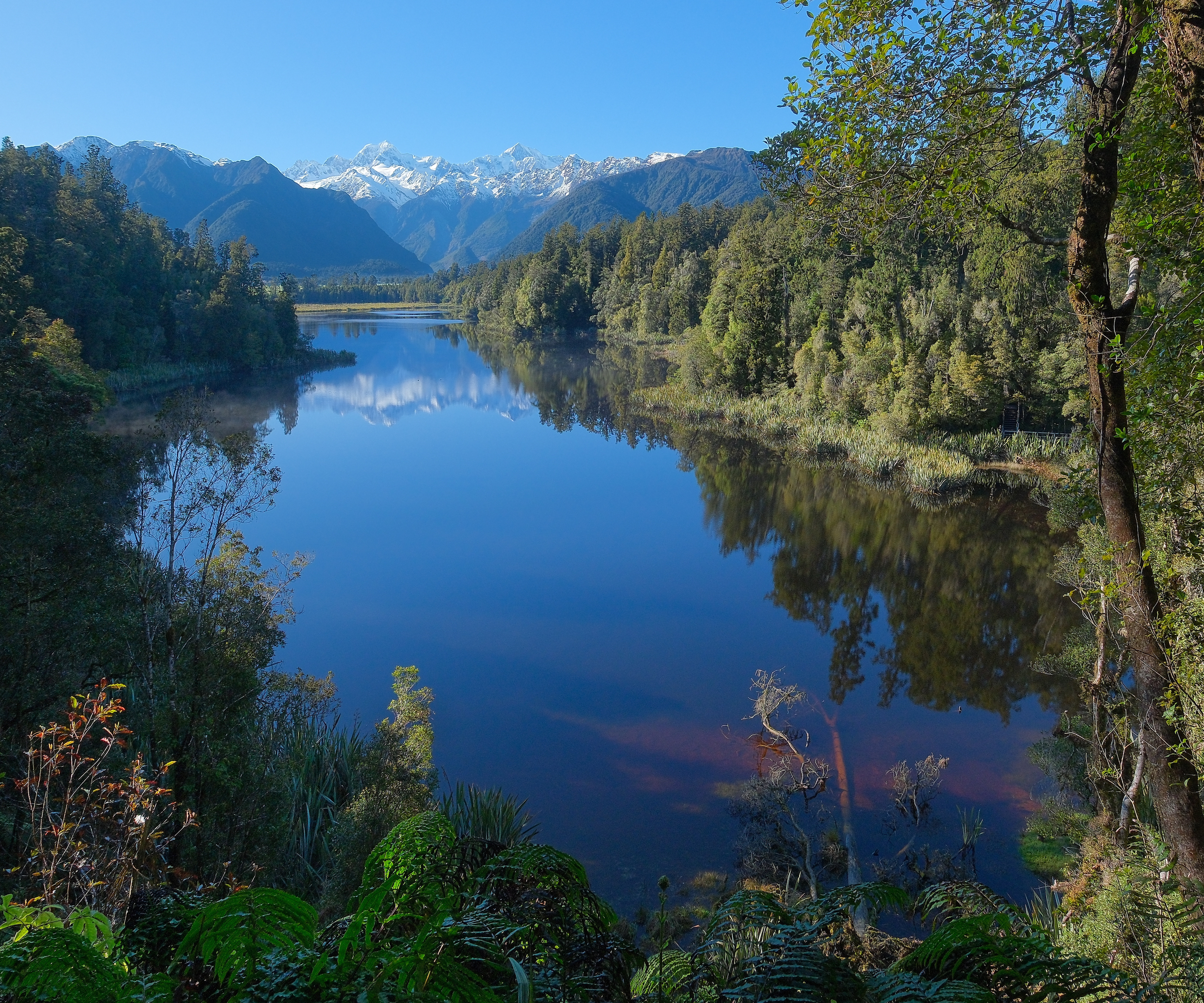
View of Views

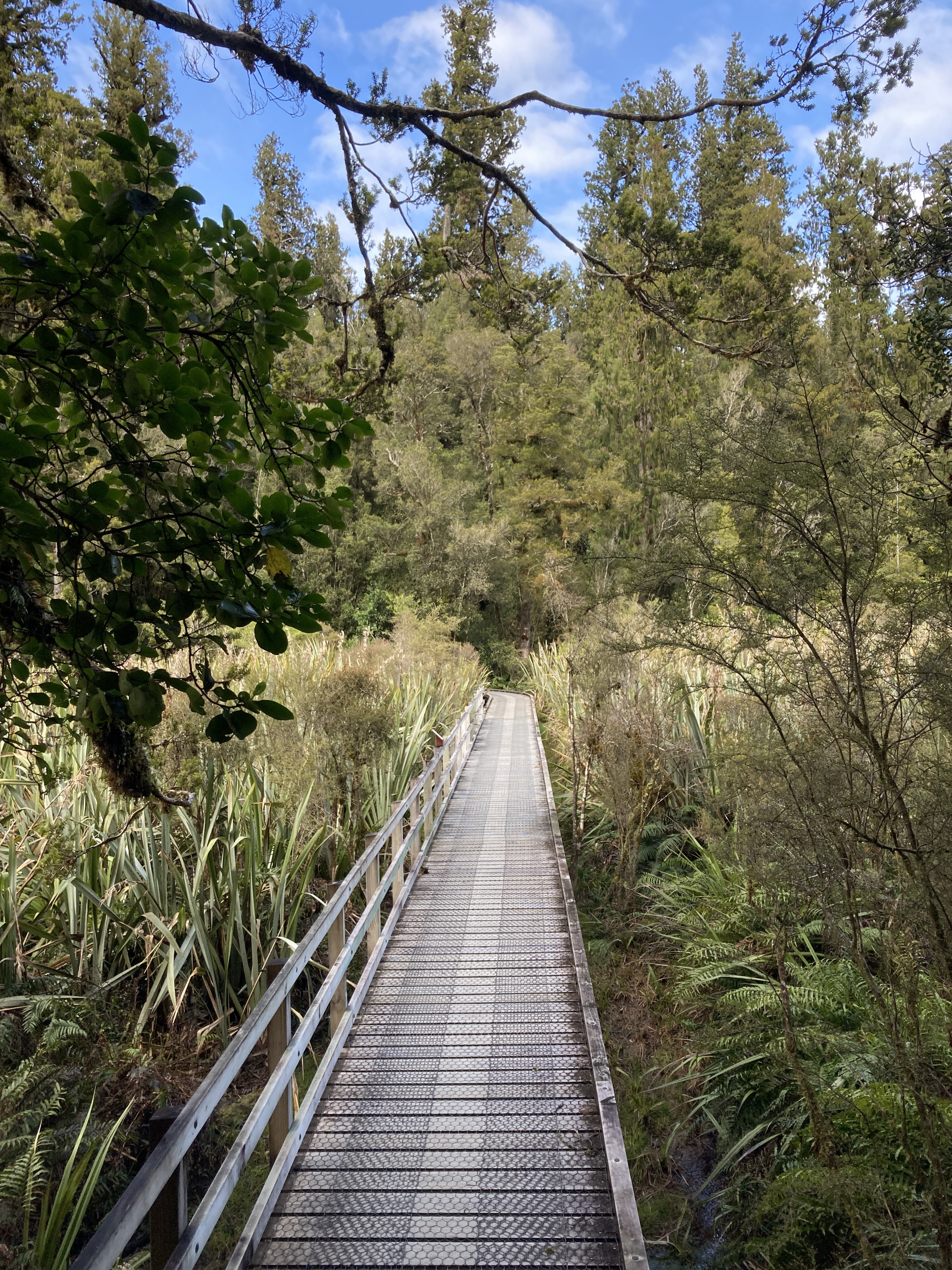
Boardwalk through wetland

In February 2019 a major landslide blocked the northern access road to the Fox Glacier. As part of a $3.9 million government plan to offset this closure, the facilities at Lake Matheson were improved, linking it to the township with a cycling/walking trail from Cook Flat. A neglected track leading from the eastern side of the Lake Matheson Walk to a circuit around Lake Gault, an 8 km return trip, was upgraded to Easy status.

== Flora and fauna ==
The lake and its small catchment are almost entirely surrounded by native podocarp forest. Around the edge of the lake the forest is mainly composed of Hall's tōtara (Podocarpus laetus), southern rātā (Metrosideros umbellata), kāmahi (Weinmannia racemosa), and rimu (Dacrydium cupressinum). Other forest trees include miro (Prumnopitys ferruginea), broadleaf (Griselinia littoralis), kahikatea (Dacrycarpus dacrydioides), mountain horopito (Pseudowintera colorata), and pate (Schefflera digitata). At the point where the walkway climbs higher tōtara becomes less common and rimu and Quintinia serrata more common. The lake contains the rare aquatic plant stout water milfoil (Myriophyllum robustum). Wetlands bordering the lake contain flax (Phormium tenax) and spike sedge (Eleocharis acuta).

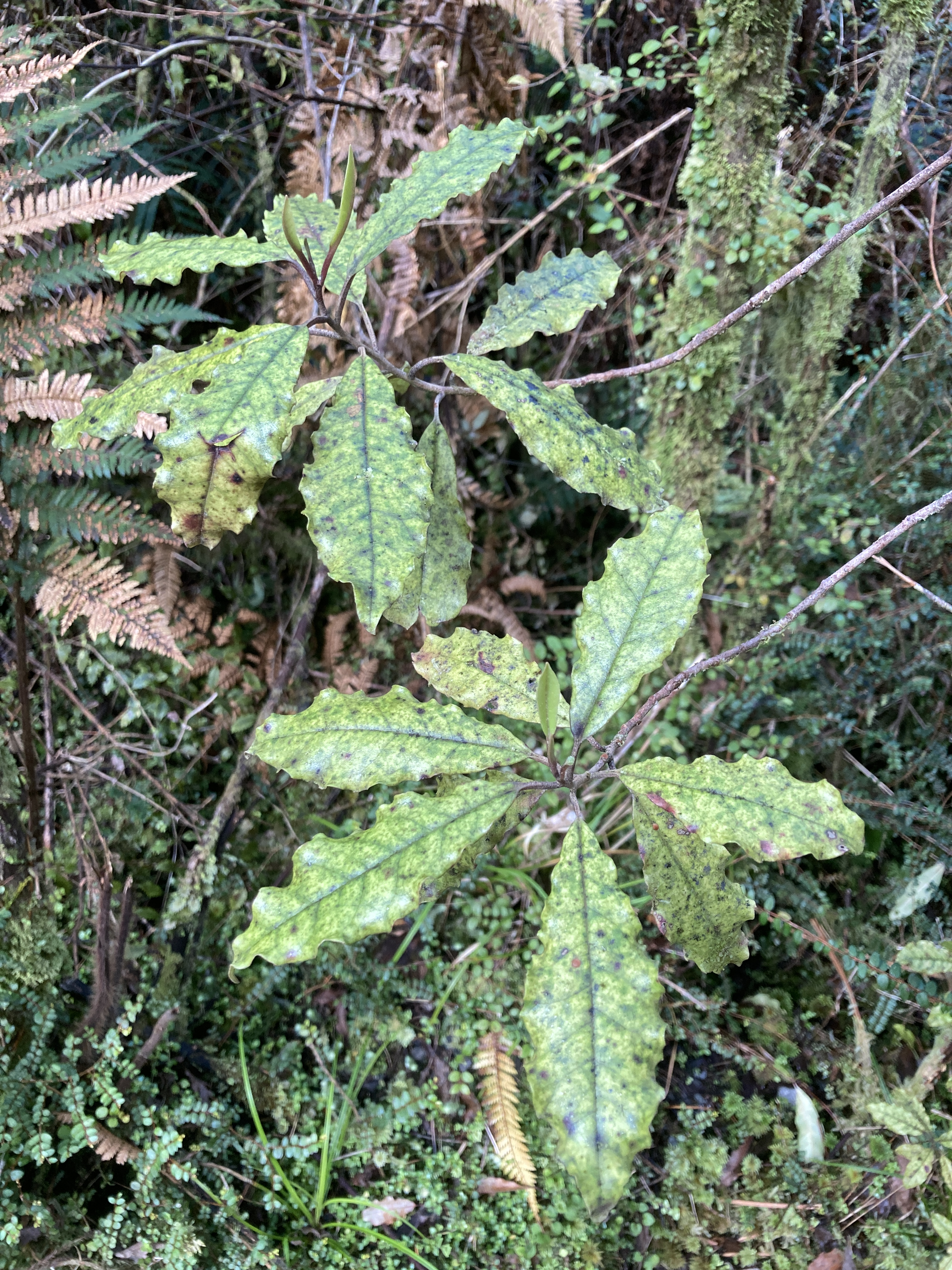
Quintinia serrata

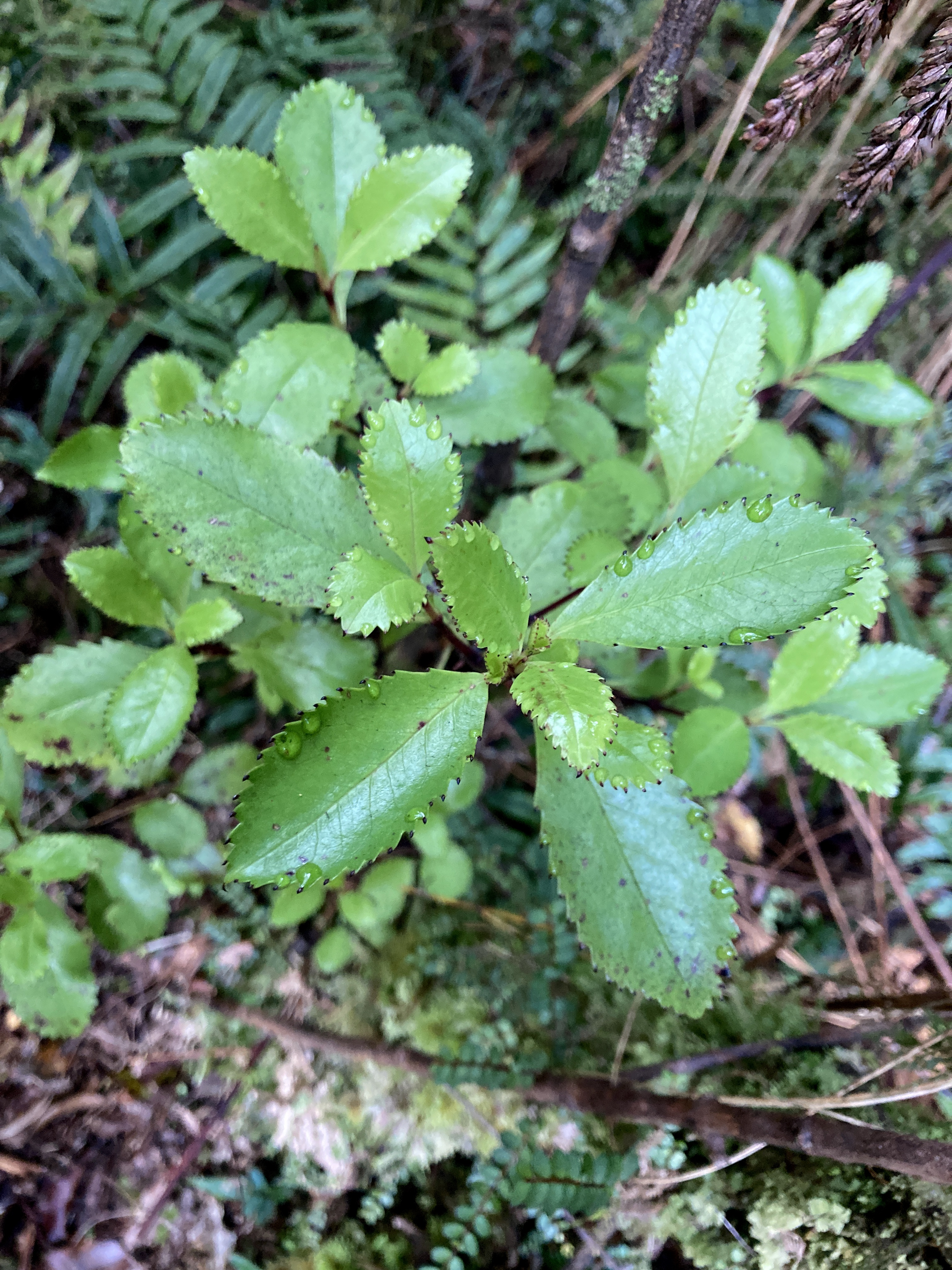
Ascarina lucida

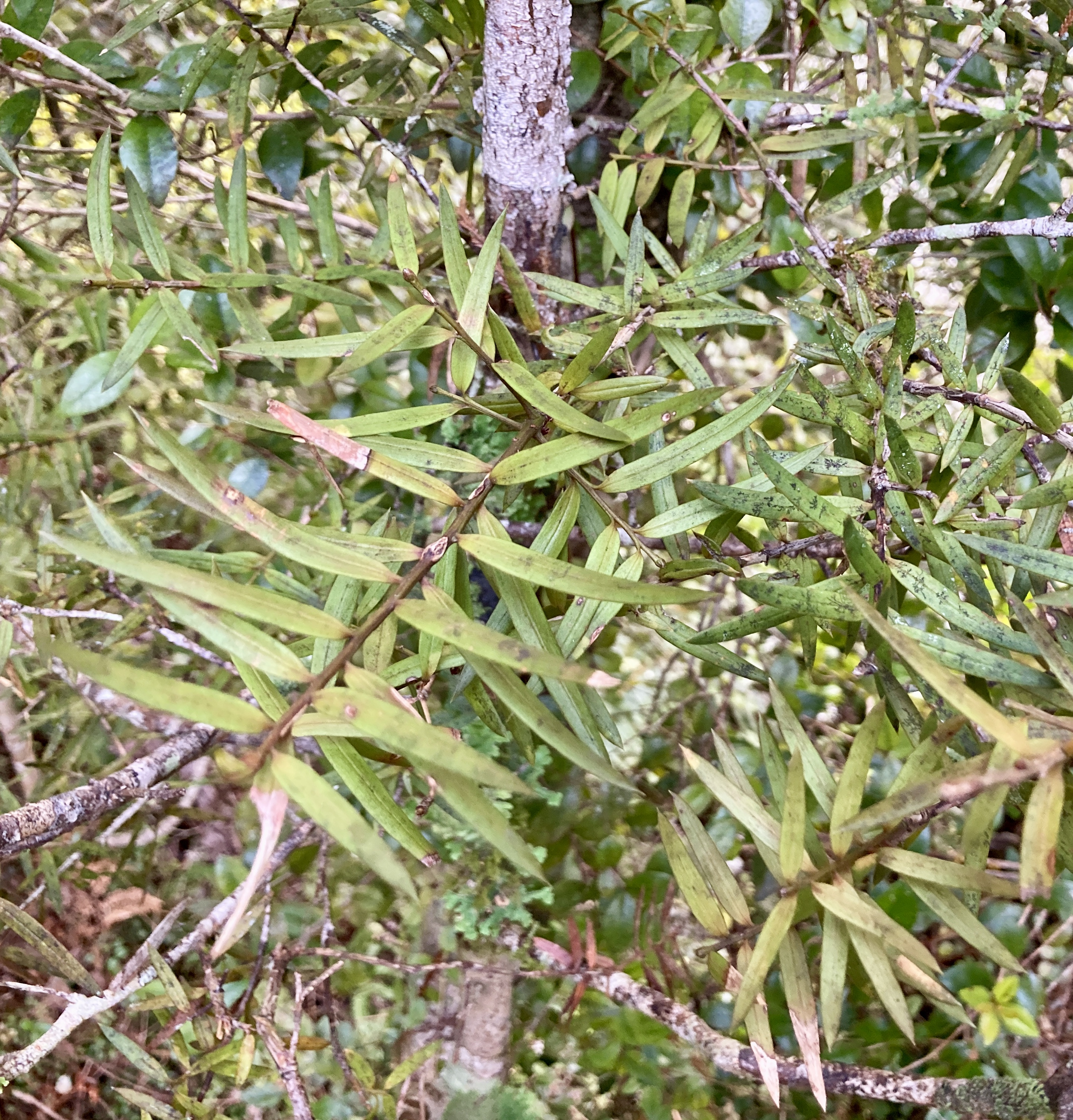
Podocarpus laetus

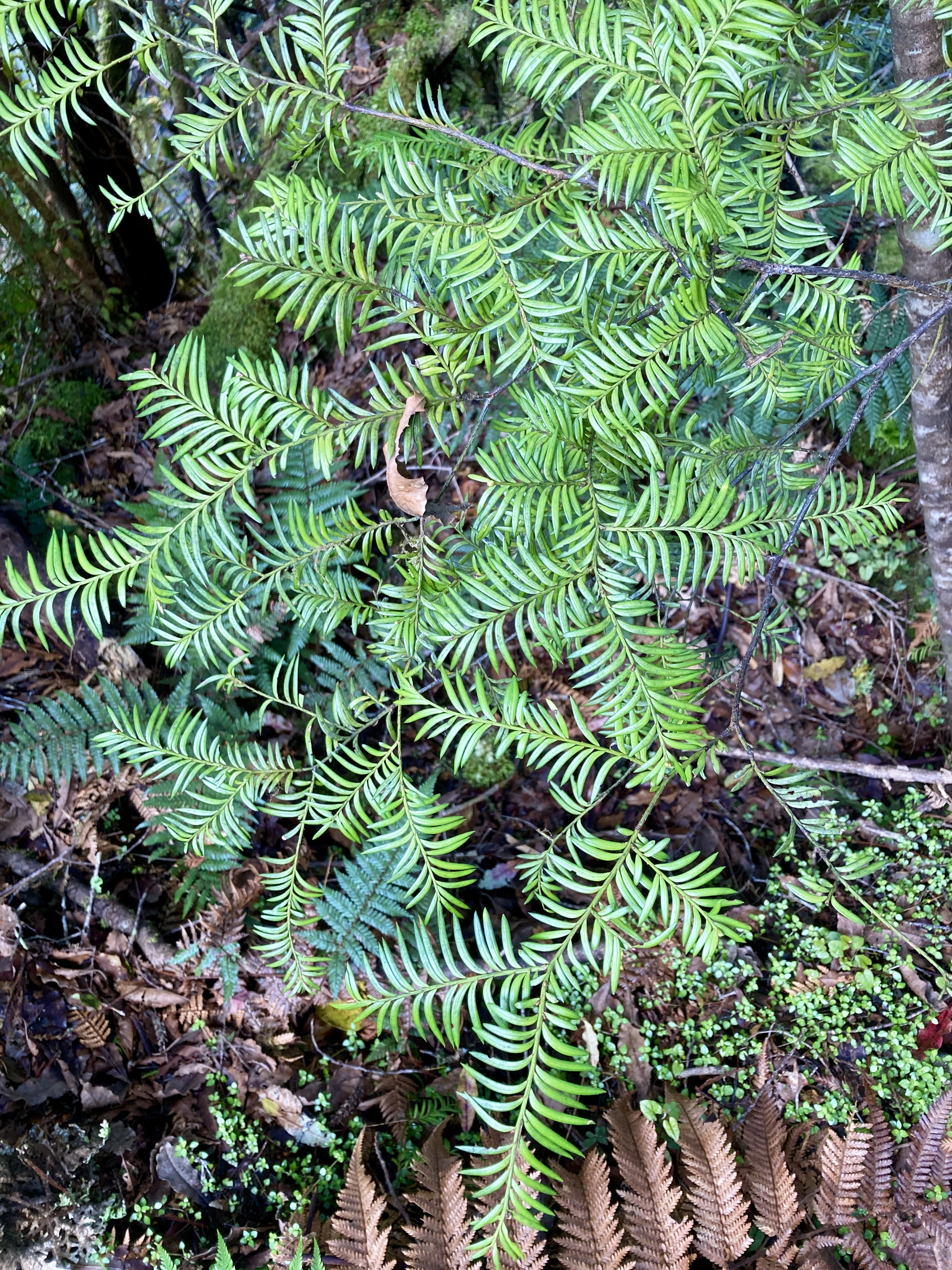
Prumnopitys taxifolia

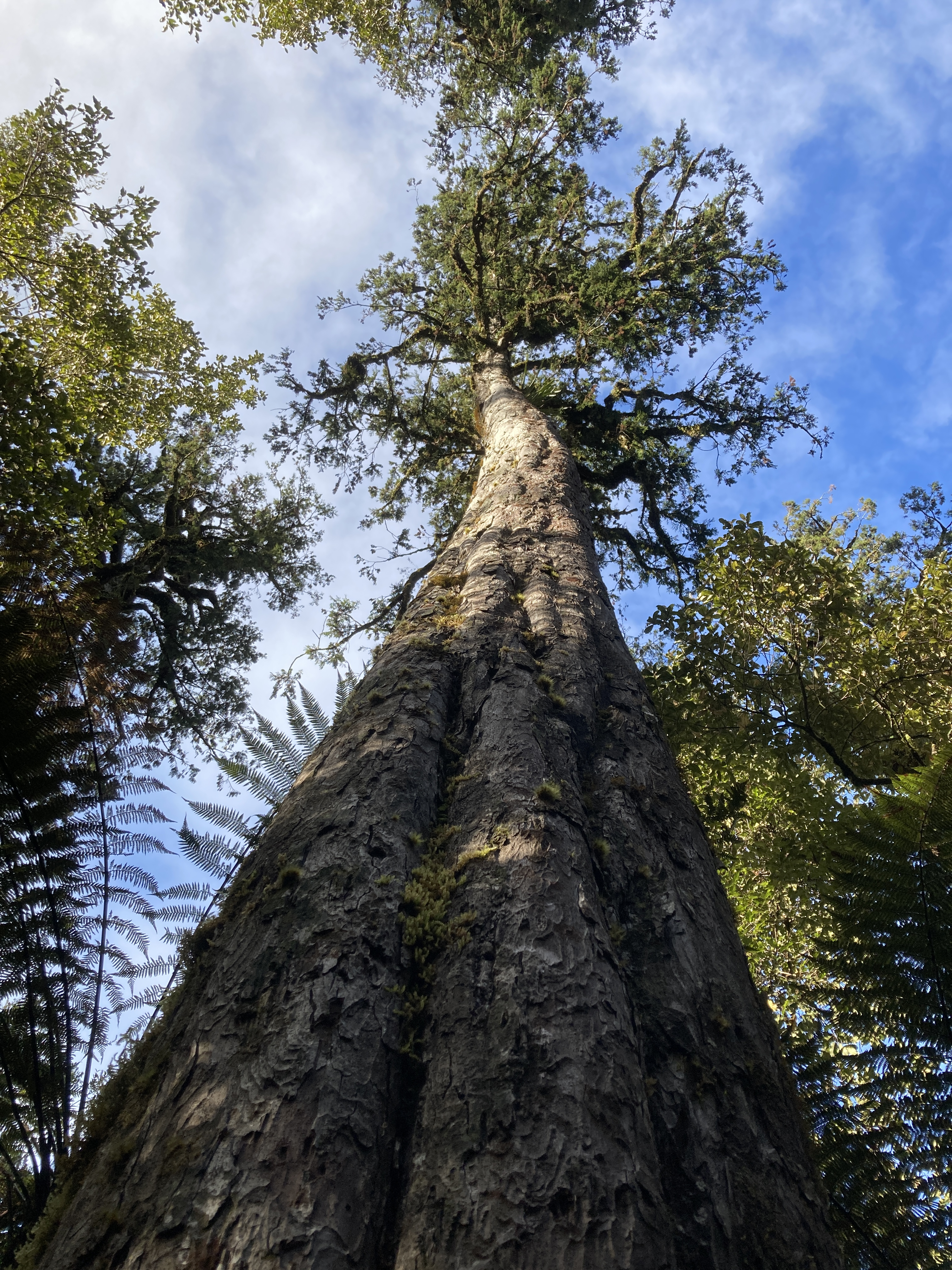
Dacrydium cupressinum

Ferns and mosses are common around the lake, and notable species include the Prince of Wales feathers fern (Leptopteris superba), shining spleenwort (Asplenium oblongifolium) and hanging spleenwort (Asplenium flaccidum). The giant moss Dawsonia can be seen at several points.

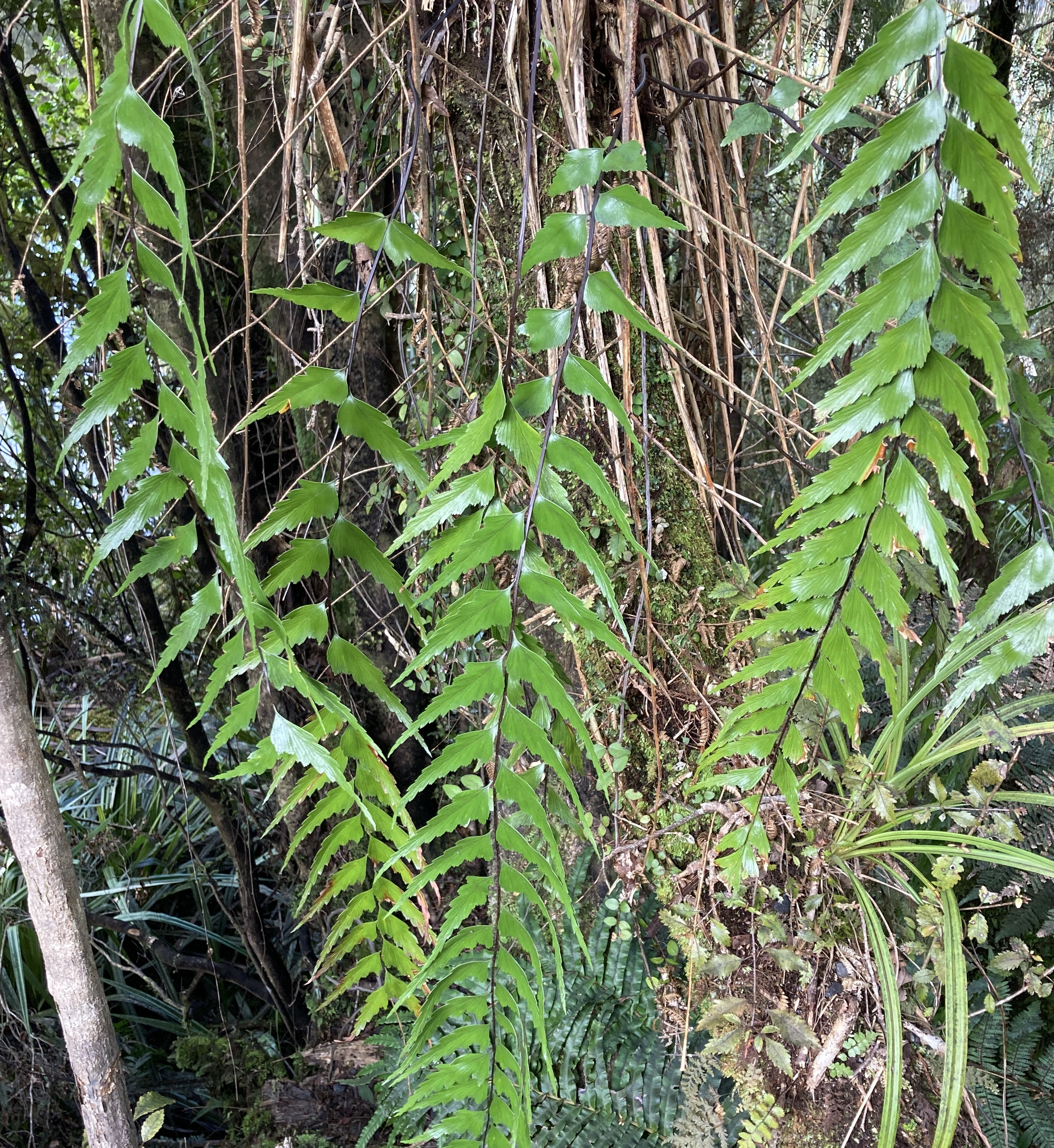
Asplenium oblongifolium

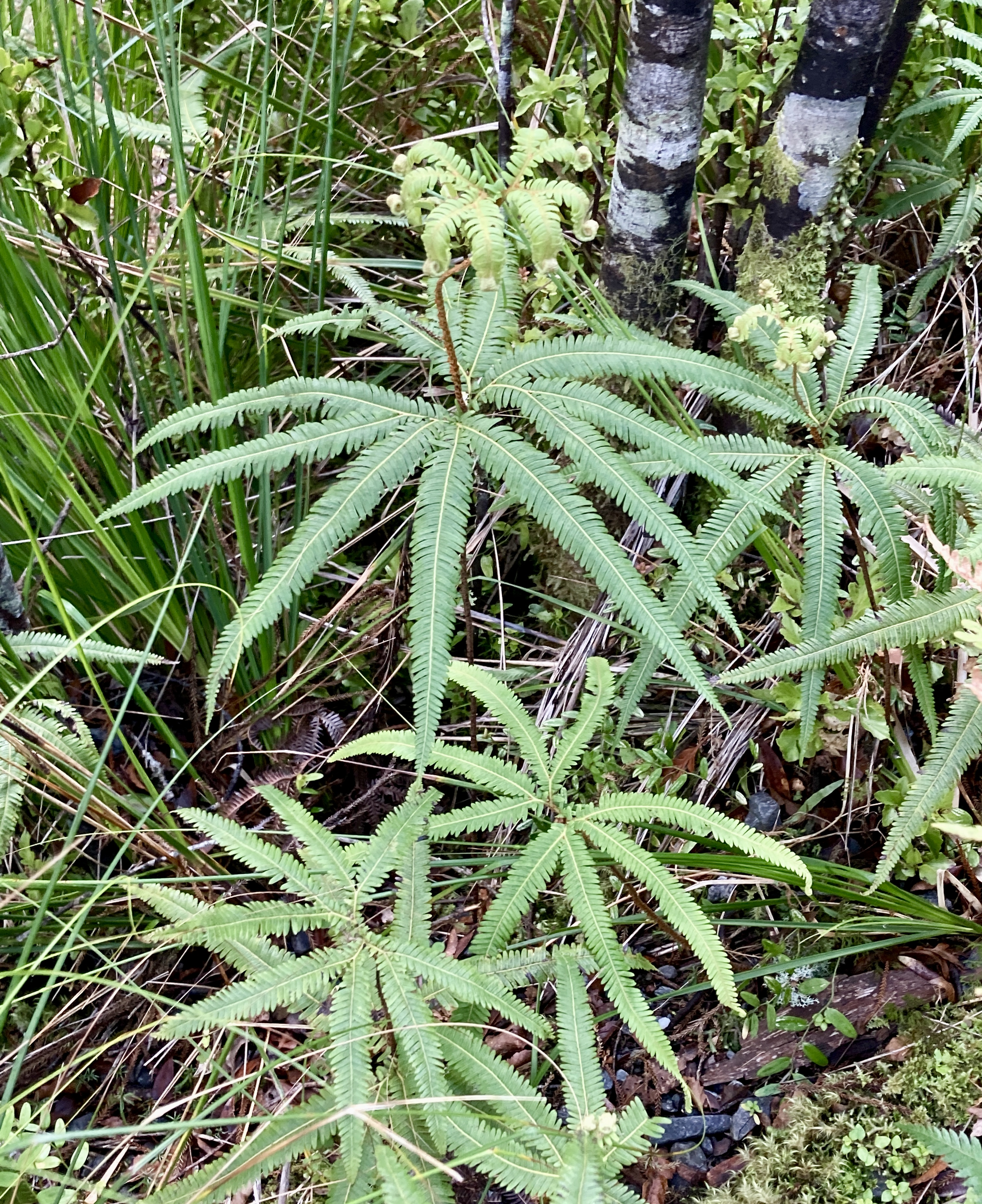
Umbrella fern

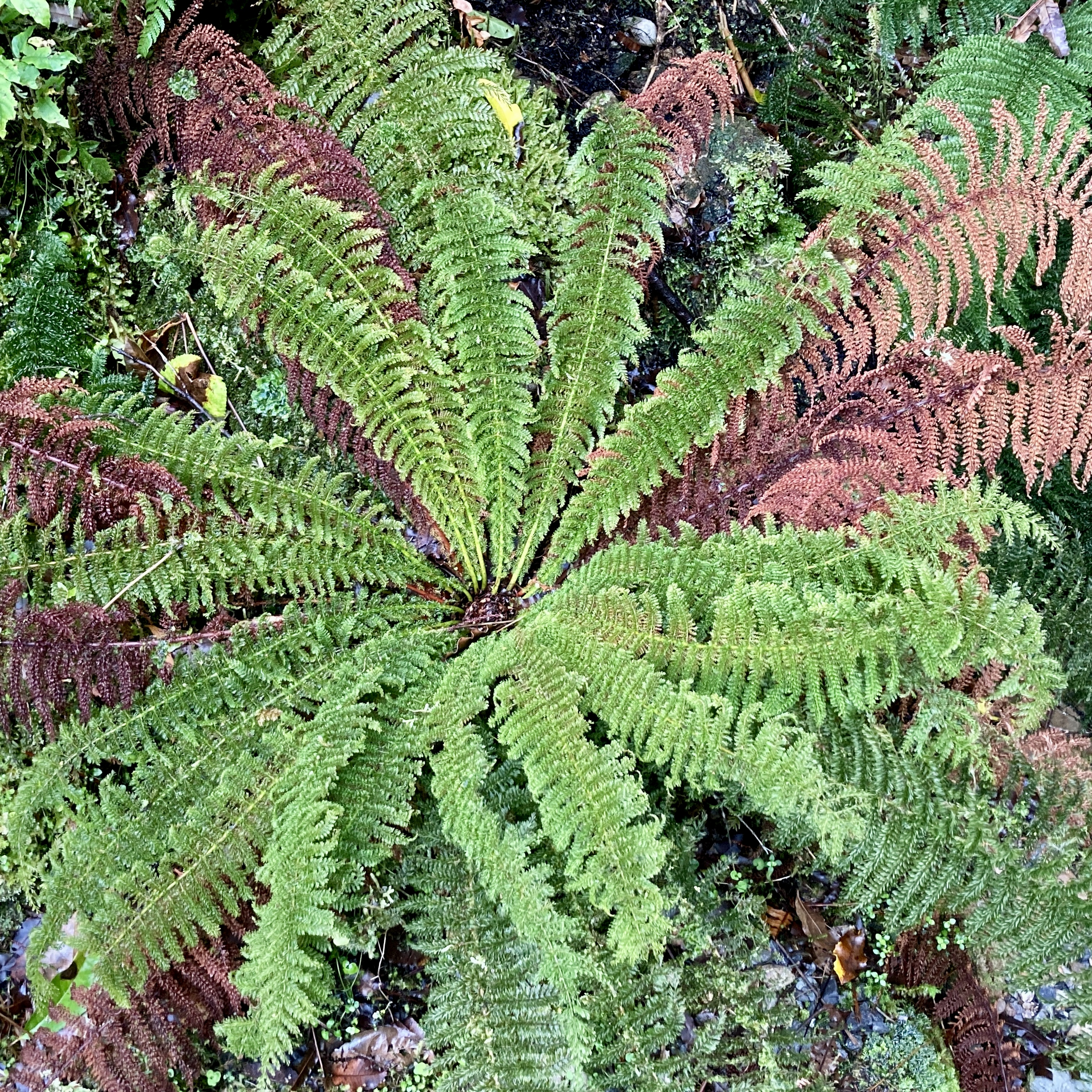
Leptopteris superba

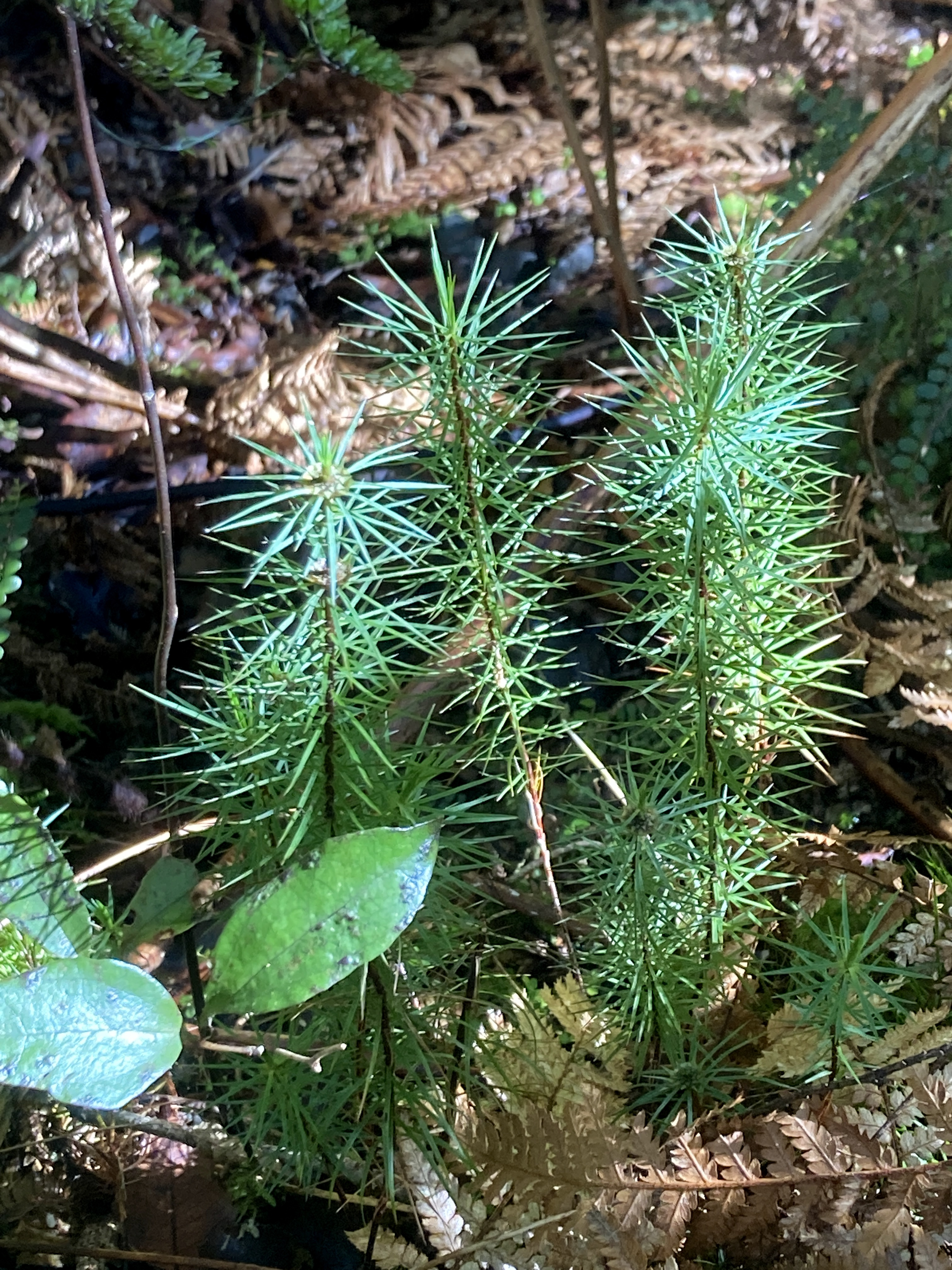
Dawsonia

Fernbirds or mātātā (Poodytes punctatus) can be found in the wetland around the lake, and the endangered species of Ōkārito brown kiwi known as rowi (Apteryx rowi) have been released in the neighbouring Omoeroa Ranges since December 2018. A local ecotourism operation began Project Early Bird in conjunction with the Department of Conservation in 2018 by setting 80 traps around Lake Matheson to catch introduced predatory mammals like stoats and rats.

== Photographs ==
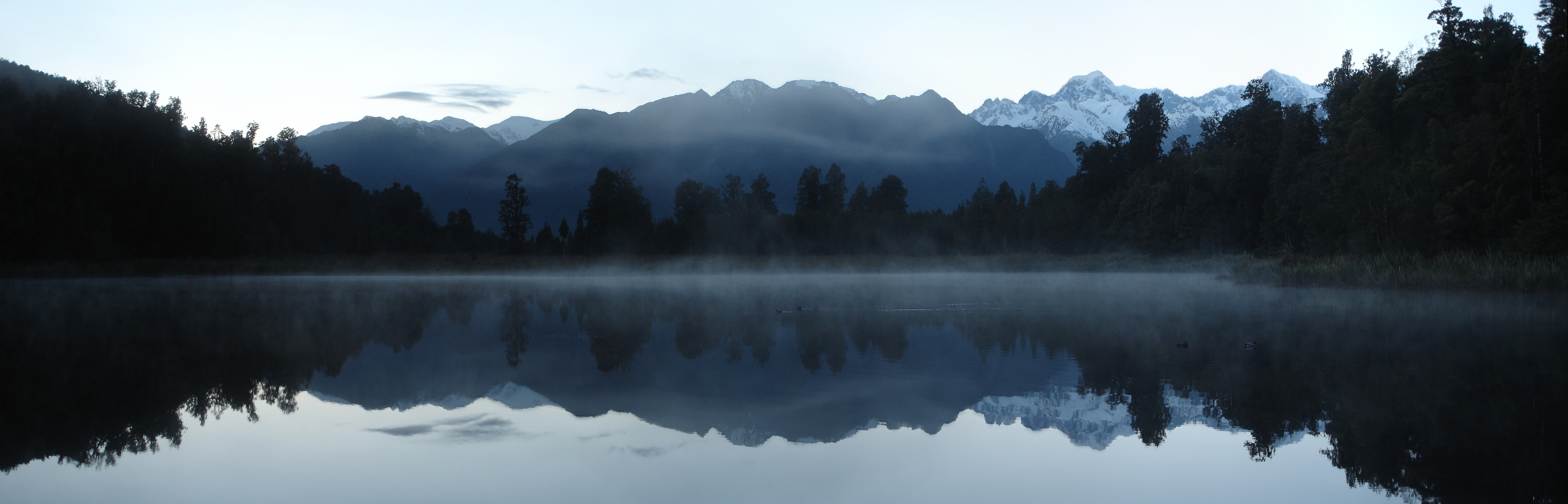
Before sunrise

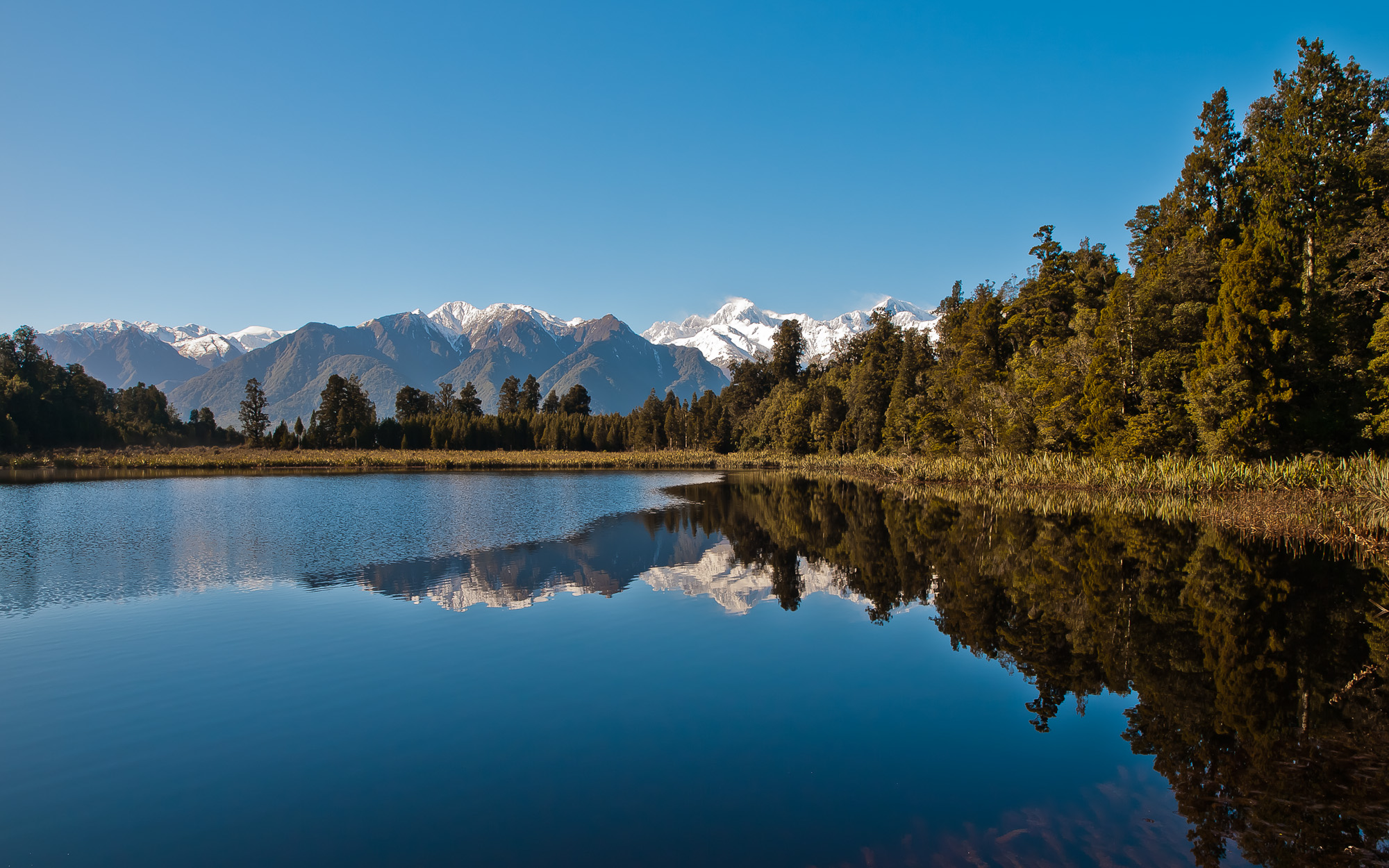
Just after sunrise

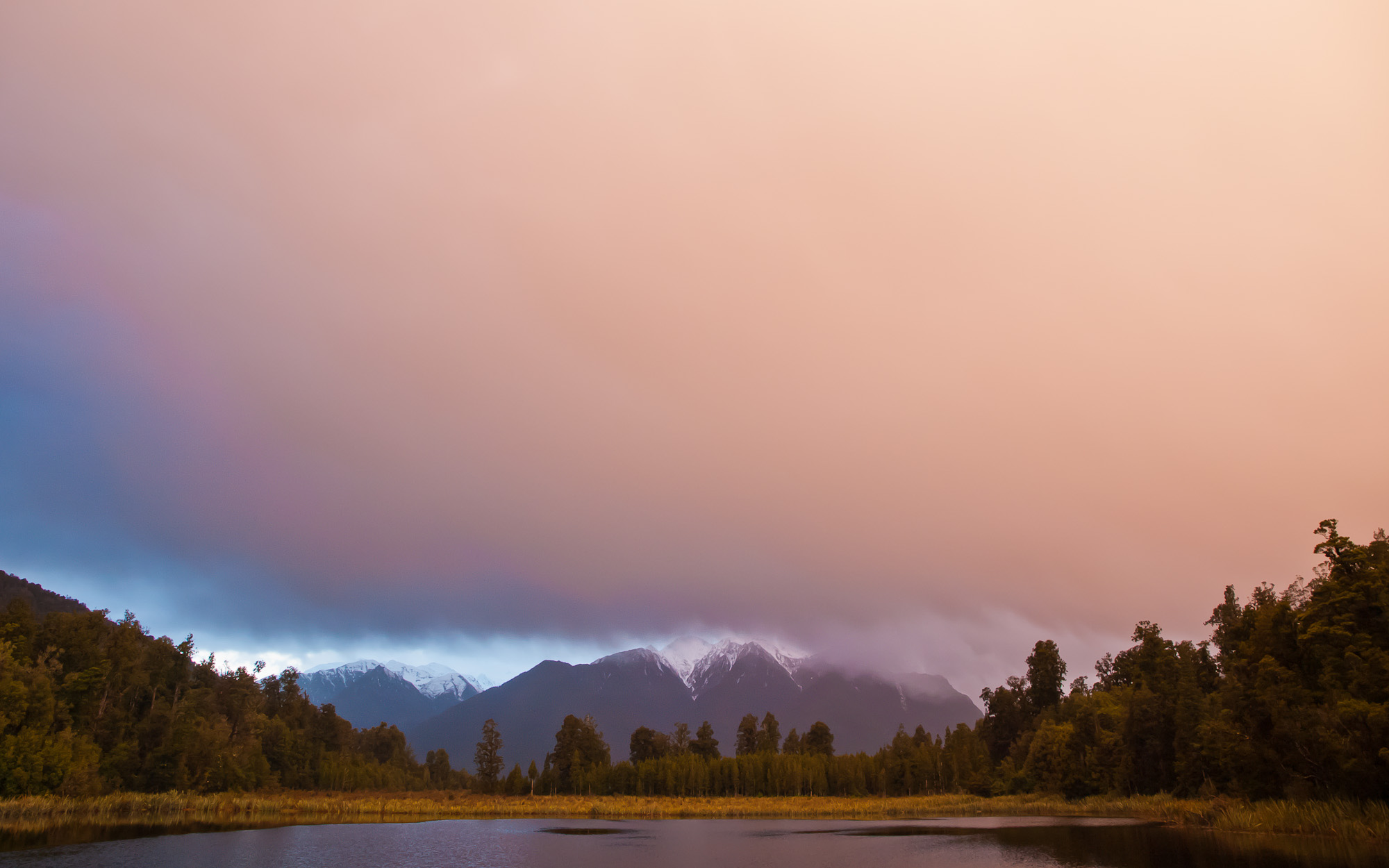
Just before sunset

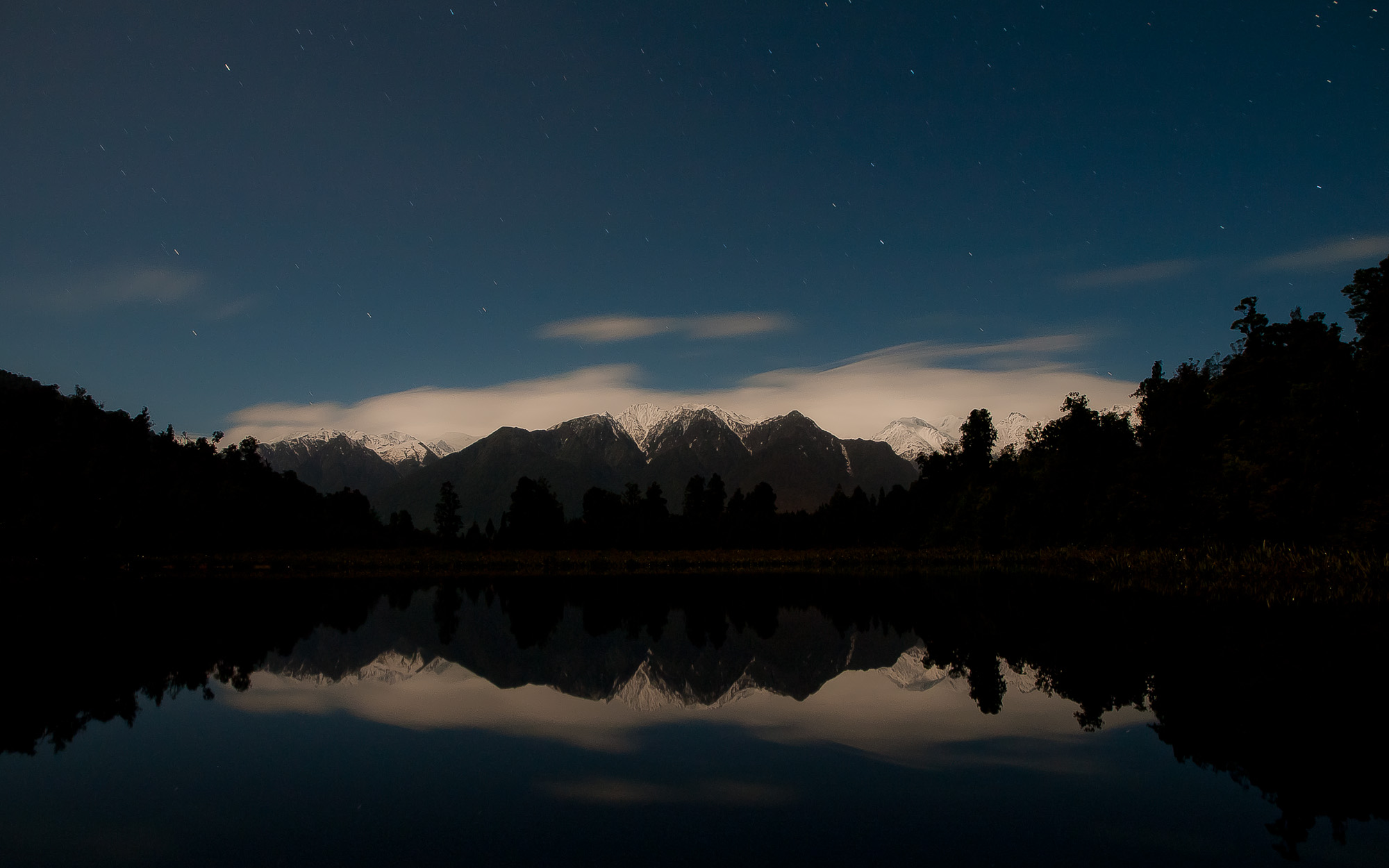
At night

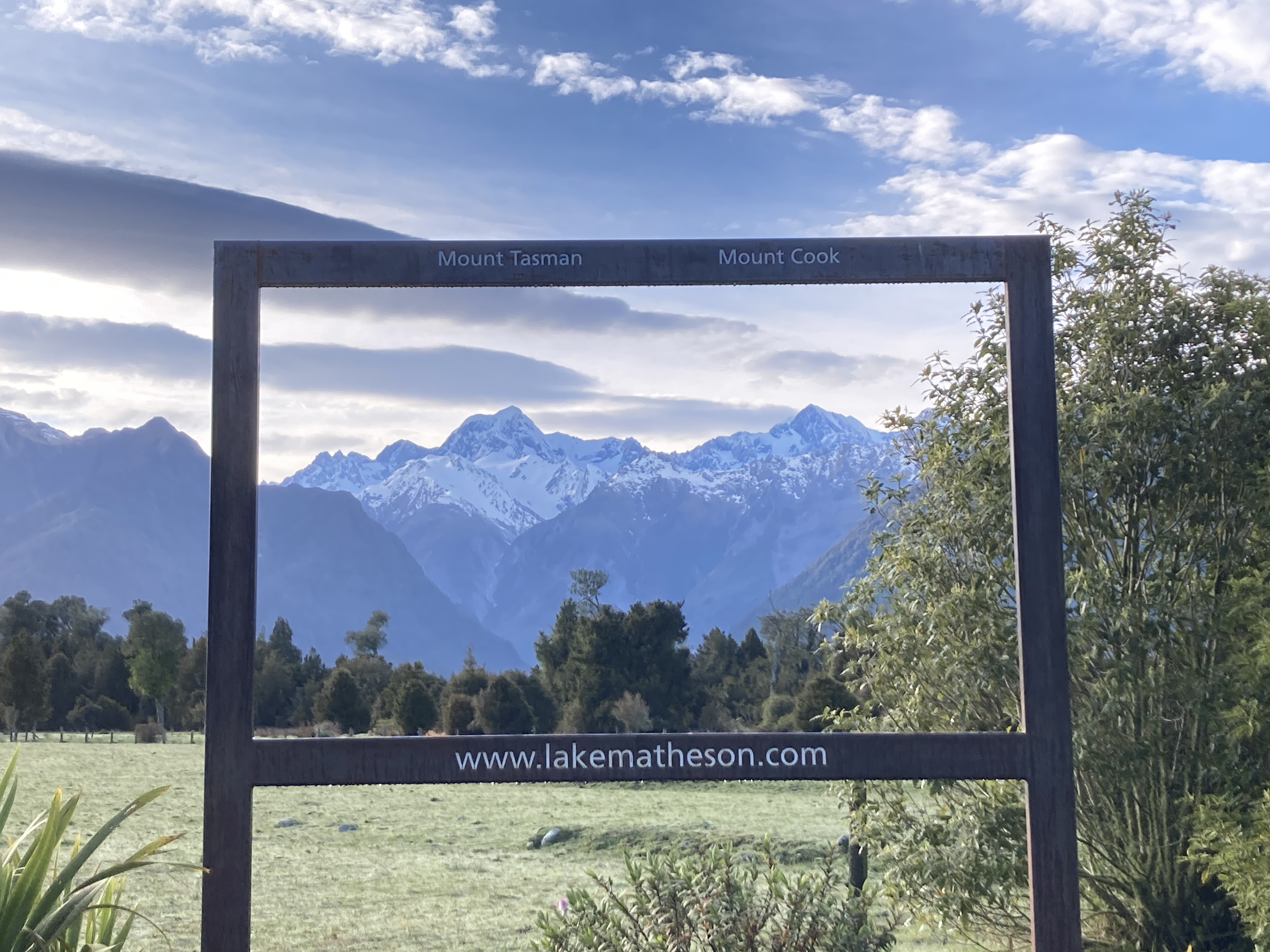
Photo opportunity at the start of the walk
