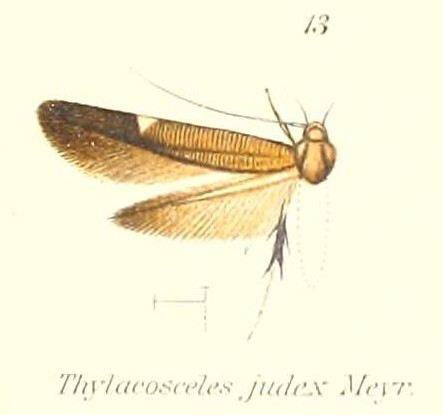

Scientific classification
- Kingdom: Animalia
- Phylum: Arthropoda
- Class: Insecta
- Order: Lepidoptera
- Family: Stathmopodidae
- Genus: Thylacosceles
- Species: T. judex

Binomial name
- Thylacosceles judex Meyrick, 1913

= Thylacosceles judex =

Species of moth

Thylacosceles judex is a moth of the family Stathmopodidae first described by Edward Meyrick in 1913. It is found in Sri Lanka.
