= Kisejärv Landscape Conservation Area =

Protected area in Estonia

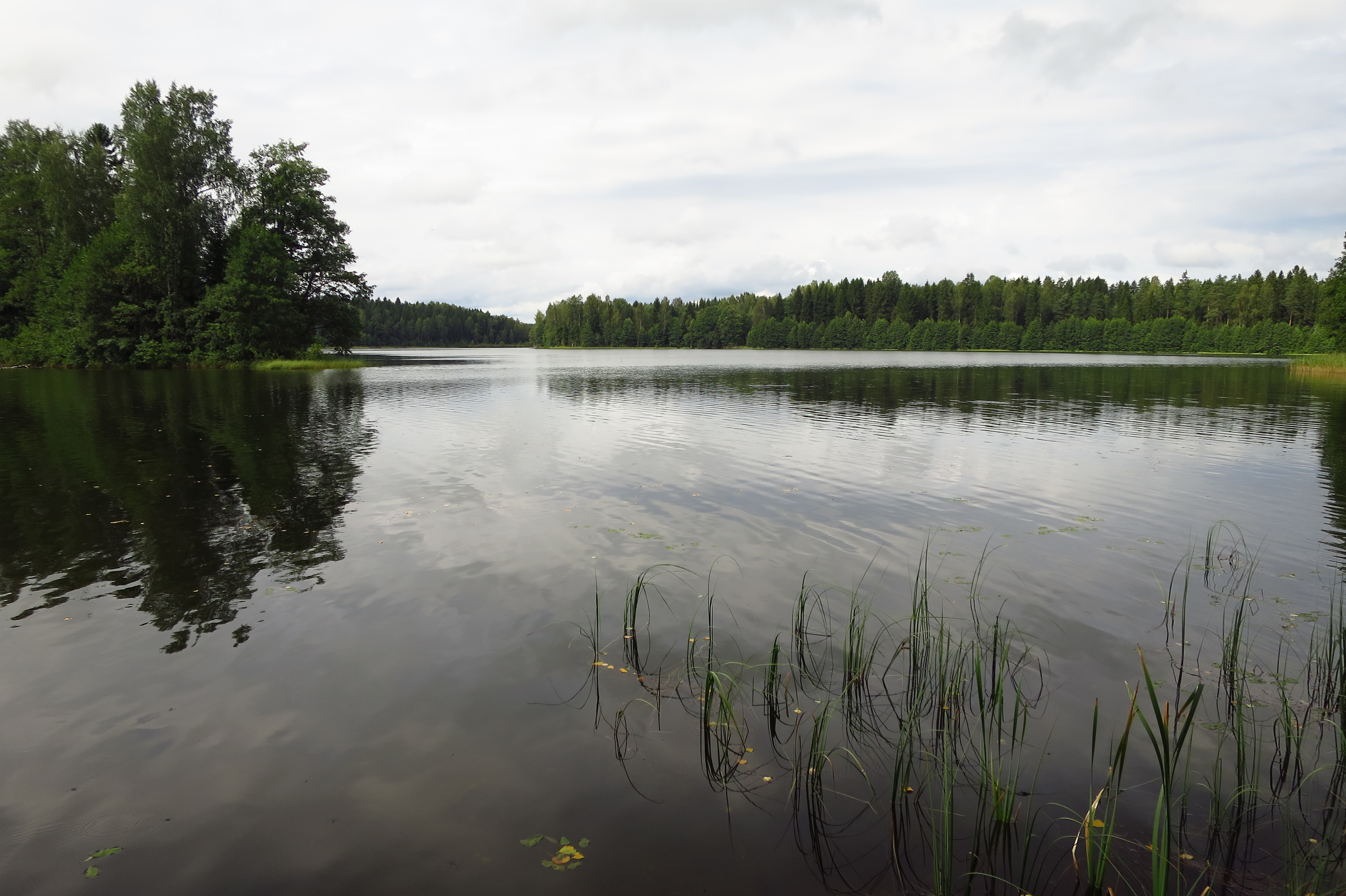

- Location within Estonia
- Location: Estonia
- Coordinates: 57°37′N 27°13′E
- Area: 669 ha (1,650 acres)
- Established: 1983 (2005)

Kisejärv Landscape Conservation Area (Estonian: Kisejärve maastikukaitseala) is a nature park in Võru County, Estonia.

Its area is 669 ha.

The protected area was designated in 1983 to protect Kisejärve lakes and theirs surrounding areas. In 2005, the protected area was redesigned to the landscape conservation area.
