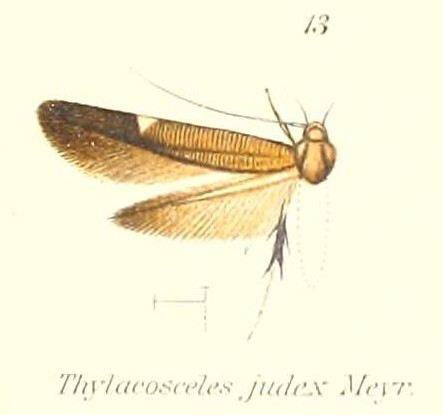
- Thylacosceles judex

Scientific classification
- Kingdom: Animalia
- Phylum: Arthropoda
- Clade: Pancrustacea
- Class: Insecta
- Order: Lepidoptera
- Family: Stathmopodidae
- Genus: Thylacosceles; Meyrick, 1898

= Thylacosceles =

Genus of moths

Thylacosceles is a genus of moths in the family Stathmopodidae. This genus was first described by Edward Meyrick. The type species of this genus is Thylacosceles acridomima by original monotypy.

== Species ==
- Thylacosceles acridomima Meyrick, 1889 (from New Zealand)
- Thylacosceles angareuta Meyrick, 1922 (from India)
- Thylacosceles cerata Meyrick, 1913 (from Sri Lanka)
- Thylacosceles judex Meyrick, 1913 (from Sri Lanka)
- Thylacosceles pithanodes Bradley, 1961 (from Guadalcanal)
- Thylacosceles radians Philpott, 1918 (from New Zealand)
