= Thylacosceles radians =

- Male
- Female

Scientific classification
- Kingdom: Animalia
- Phylum: Arthropoda
- Clade: Pancrustacea
- Class: Insecta
- Order: Lepidoptera
- Family: Stathmopodidae
- Genus: Thylacosceles
- Species: T. radians

Binomial name
- Thylacosceles radians Philpott, 1918

Species of moth endemic to New Zealand

Thylacosceles radians is a moth of the family Stathmopodidae. This species was first described by Alfred Philpott in 1918. It is endemic to New Zealand and has been observed in the North and South Islands. This species inhabits native forest. Larvae live on the underside of fern fronds, inside a silken mesh coated with fern spores. The likely larval host plants include the epiphytic fern species Zealandia pustulata, Asplenium oblongifolium and Dendroconche scandens. Larvae create holes and then form columns of spores on upper side of the fern fronds. Adults are on the wing all year round.

== Taxonomy ==
This species was first described by Alfred Philpott. George Hudson discussed and illustrated this species under this name in his 1928 book The butterflies and moths of New Zealand. The male holotype, collected at Seaward Bush in Invercargill, is held at the New Zealand Arthropod Collection.

== Description ==
Philpott described this species as follows:

♂♀. 8-9 1/2 mm. Head and palpi shining white. Antennae white, infuscated on apical third. Thorax grey-whitish. Abdomen ochreous-whitish, apical half in ♂ dark fuscous. Legs white, tibial fringe black. Forewings moderate, parallel-sided, costa hardly arched, apex acute, termen extremely oblique, leaden fuscous, somewhat ochreous-tinged in ♀; an obscure suffused white blotch in disc at 3/4, sometimes preceded by a white spot on tornus : cilia fuscous. Hindwings and cilia grey-fuscous.

== Distribution ==
This species is endemic to New Zealand. It has been observed in both the North and South Islands.

== Habitat and hosts ==
T. radians inhabits native forest. Larvae live on the underside of fern fronds in a silken mesh coated with the fern's spores. They create holes through fronds and form columns of spores on upper side of that frond. Philpott hypothesised that a larval plant host for this species is the fern Zealandia pustulata, an epiphytic that often covers the trunks of the Pterophylla racemosa. Other likely hosts for larvae of T. radians include Asplenium oblongifolium and Dendroconche scandens.

== Behaviour ==
Adults have been observed on the wing all year round.

== Gallery ==
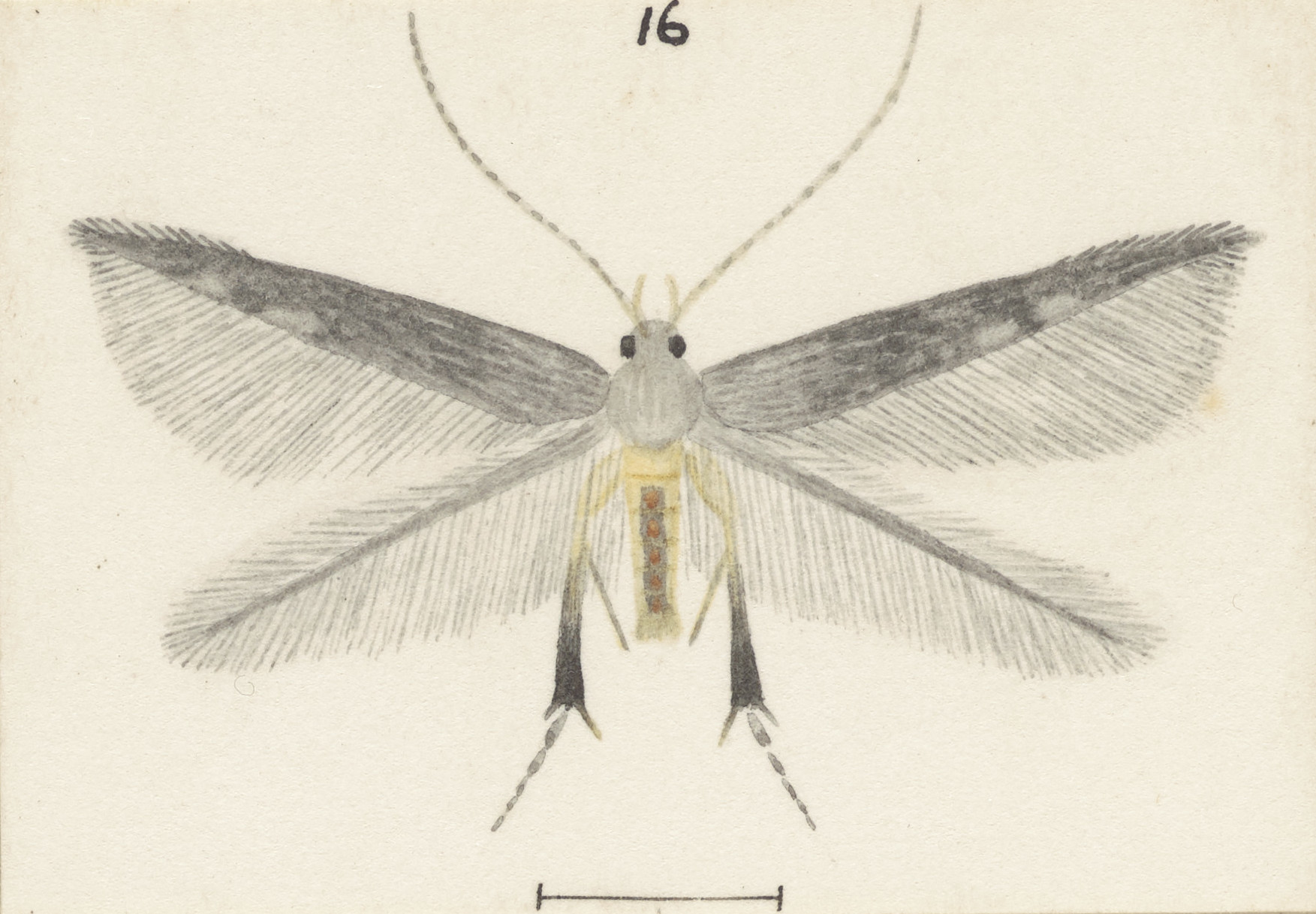
Illustration of male by Hudson.

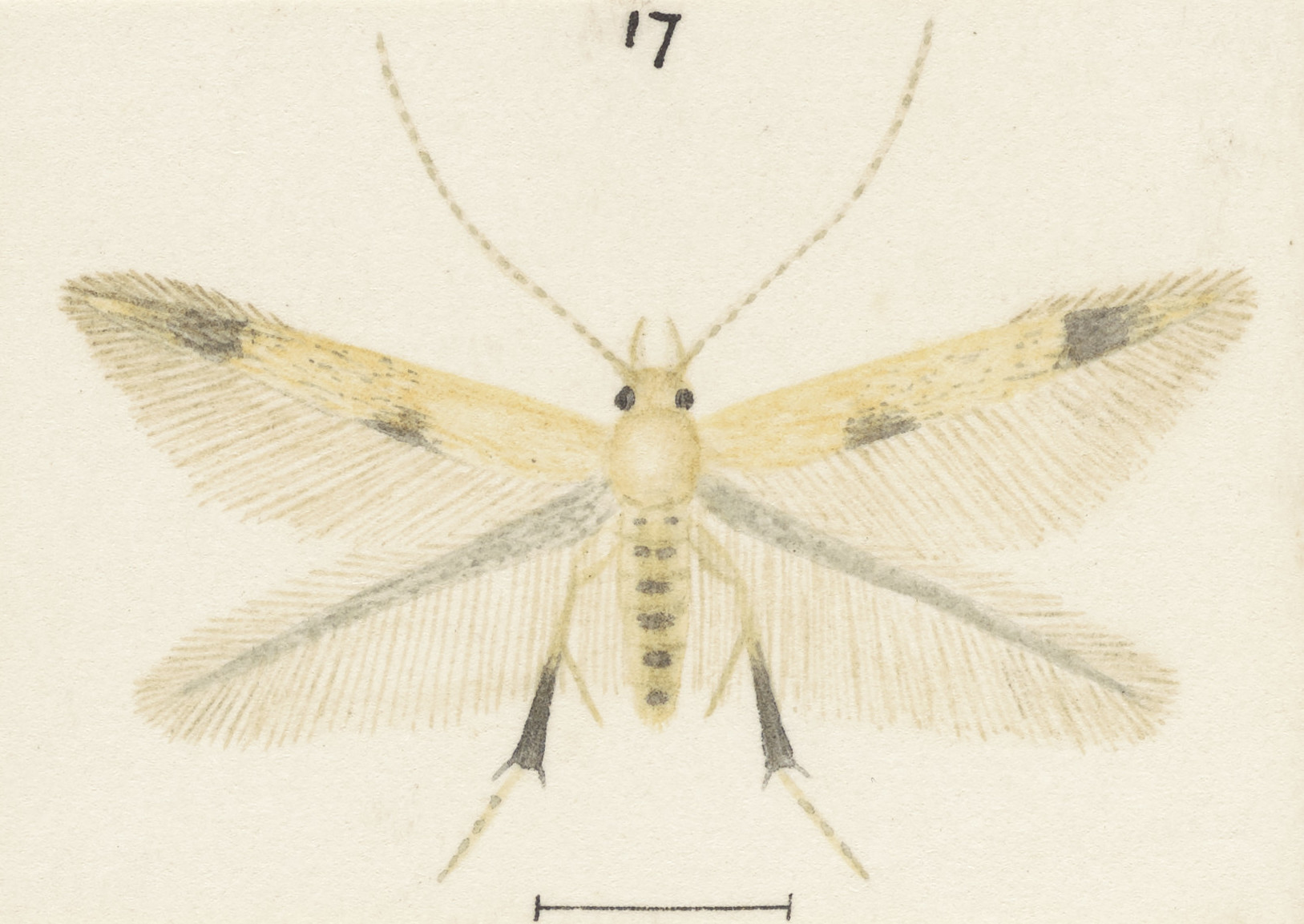
Illustration of female by Hudson.

Breeding pair.

Larva of T. radians on the underside of a Microsorum fern.
