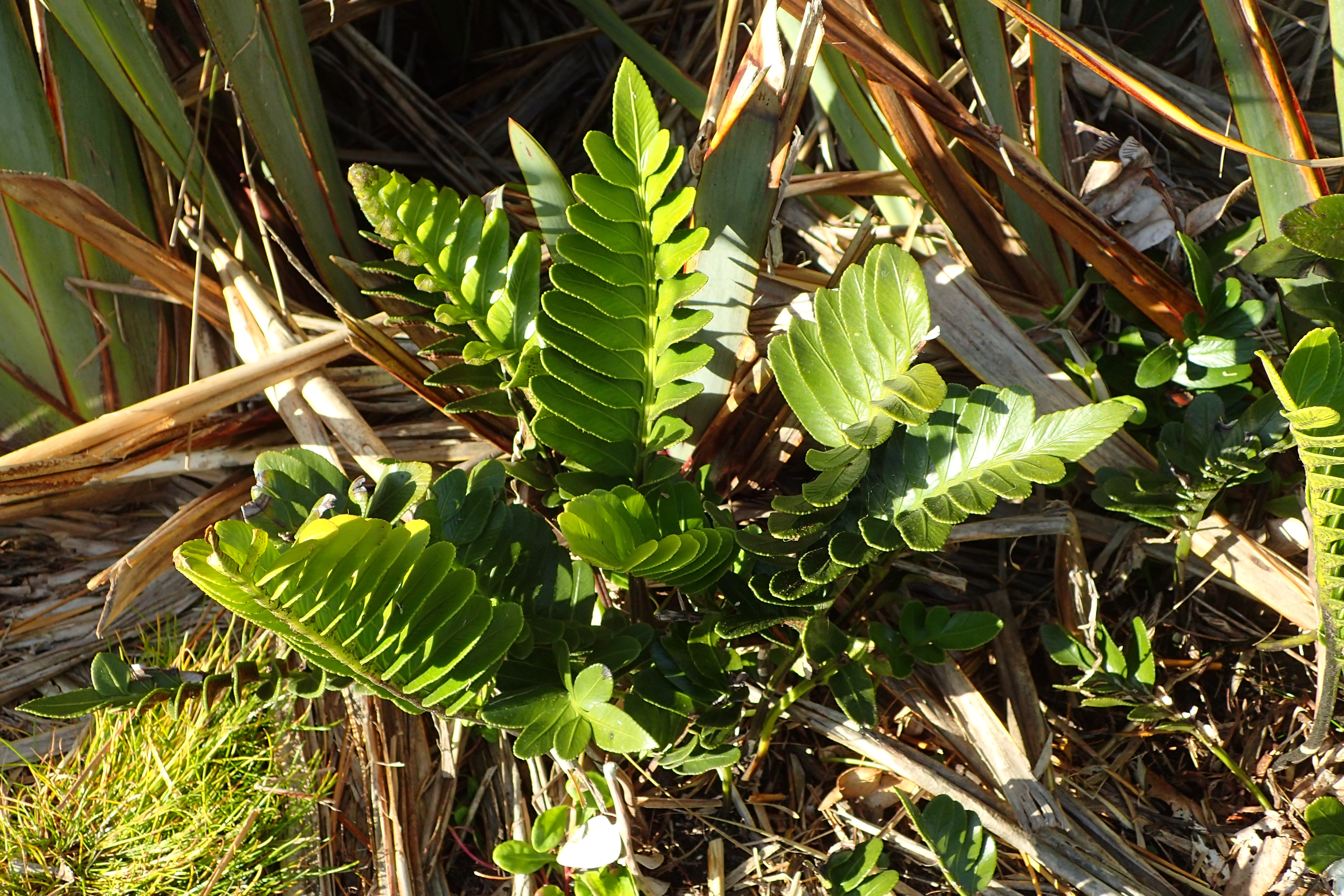

Scientific classification
- Kingdom: Plantae
- Clade: Tracheophytes
- Division: Polypodiophyta
- Class: Polypodiopsida
- Order: Polypodiales
- Suborder: Aspleniineae
- Family: Aspleniaceae
- Genus: Asplenium
- Species: A. obtusatum

Binomial name
- Asplenium obtusatum G.Forst.

= Asplenium obtusatum =

Species of fern

Asplenium obtusatum, the shore spleenwort or paranako, is a species of spleenwort found in New Zealand and other Pacific isles.

== Description ==
Shore spleenworts grow up to 1 metre (3.3 ft) high and the same across. They are evergreen plants with plump fronds and bulky rhizomes that often protrude above-ground as a woody lump. Spleenworts have elongated, rather than circular, sori; those of Asplenium obtustatum grow to 1 centimetre (0.39 in) long.

== Distribution ==
Shore spleenworts are found in coastal habitats on both main islands of New Zealand (North and South), as well as Stewart Island, Campbell Island, and the Chatham, the Snares, Auckland, and the Antipodes islands. It is also reported from various southern Pacific and Atlantic islands and from parts of South America.

== Taxonomy ==
Asplenium obtusatum is commonly known as the shore spleenwort; its Māori name is "paranako". The specific epithet, obtusatum, means "blunt".

There are two subspecies: A. o. obtusatum, more common in the South Island; and A. o. northlandicum, smaller and found near Auckland.
