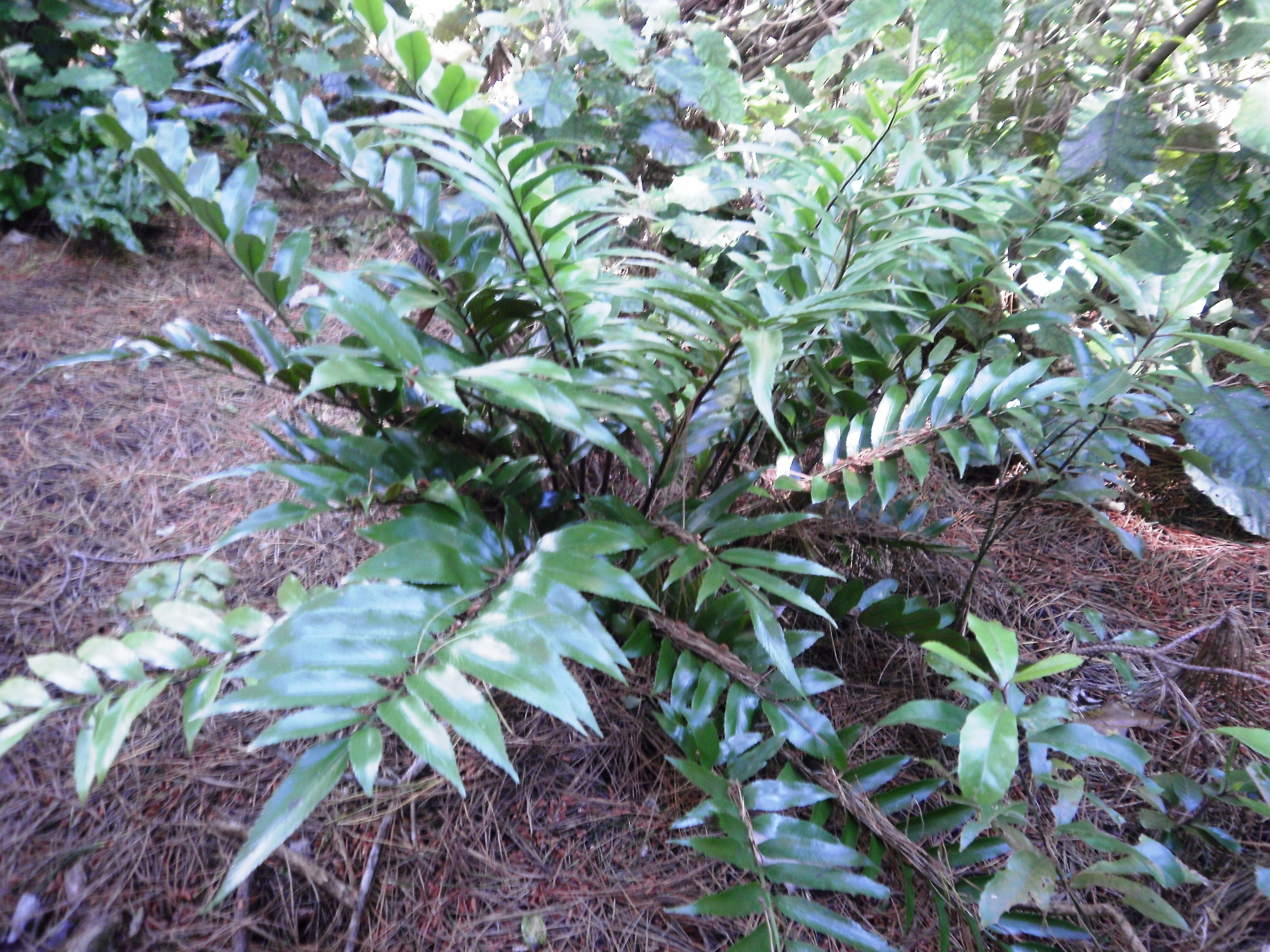

Scientific classification
- Kingdom: Plantae
- Clade: Tracheophytes
- Division: Polypodiophyta
- Class: Polypodiopsida
- Order: Polypodiales
- Suborder: Aspleniineae
- Family: Aspleniaceae
- Genus: Asplenium
- Species: A. oblongifolium

Binomial name
- Asplenium oblongifolium Colenso

= Asplenium oblongifolium =

Species of fern in the spleenwort family

Asplenium oblongifolium is a native species of fern from New Zealand. The plant's common name is shining spleenwort and its Māori name is huruhuruwhenua. A. oblongifolium is found on the North, South, Chatham and Kermadec Islands, and is found from the coast to the mountains.

== Taxonomy ==
A global phylogeny of Asplenium published in 2020 divided the genus into eleven clades, which were given informal names pending further taxonomic study. A. oblongifolium belongs to the "Neottopteris clade", members of which generally have somewhat leathery leaf tissue. It formed a clade with A. northlandicum, A. obliquum, and A. obtusatum.

== Uses ==
Fiddleheads of A. oblongifolium were traditionally eaten by Māori, but their use decreased in preference of Brassica oleracea.
