= Dystrophic lake =

Lake that contains high amounts of humic substances and organic acids

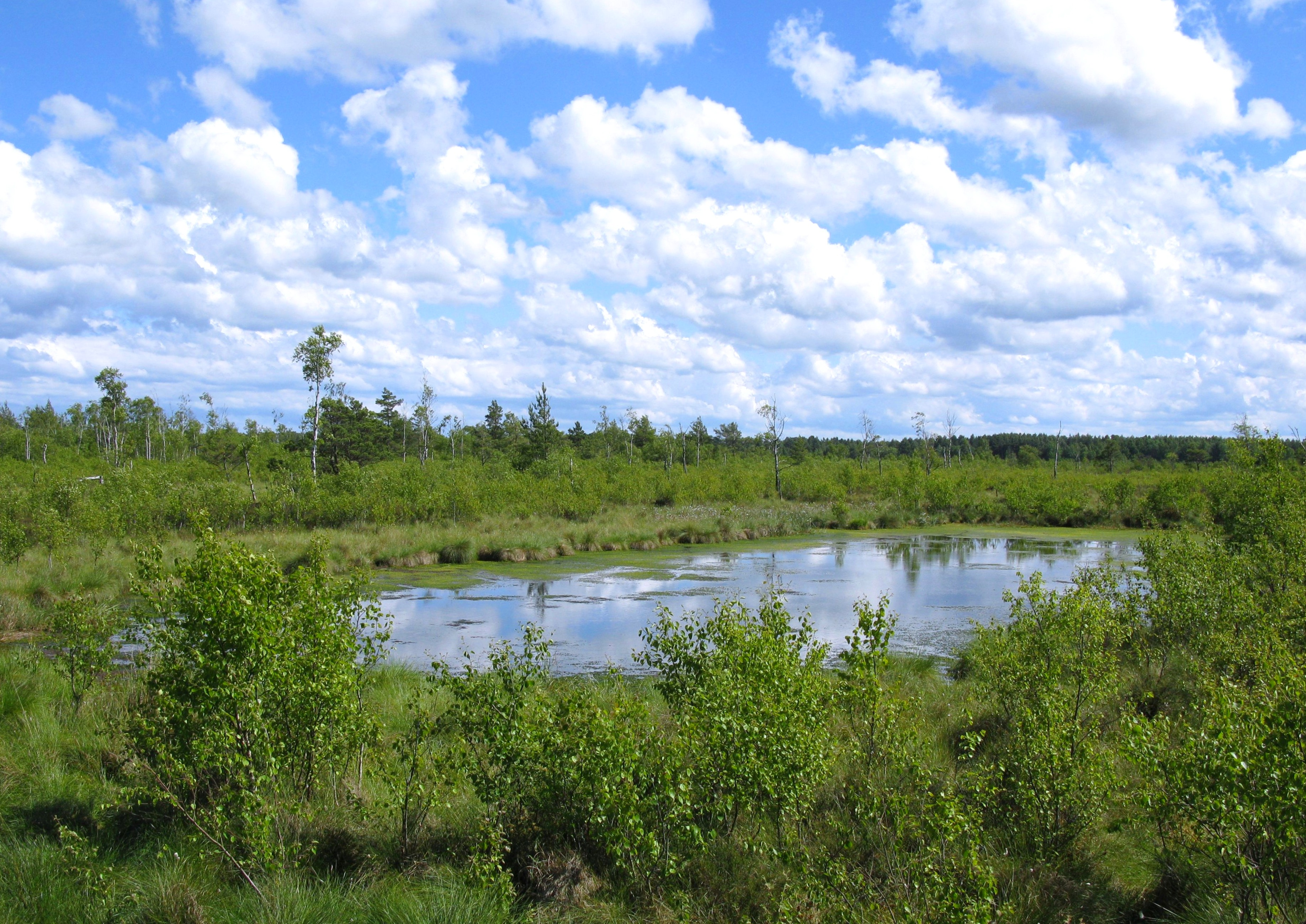
Dystrophic lake in Bielawa nature reserve in Poland

Dystrophic lakes, also known as humic lakes, are lakes that contain high amounts of humic substances and organic acids. The presence of these substances causes the water to be brown in colour and have a generally low pH of around 4.0-6.0. The presence of humic substances are mainly due to certain plants in the watersheds of the lakes, such as peat mosses and conifers. Due to these acidic conditions, few taxa are able to survive, consisting mostly of aquatic plants, algae, phytoplankton, picoplankton, and bacteria. Dystrophic lakes can be found in many areas of the world, especially in the northern boreal regions.

== Classification of dystrophic lakes ==
Dystrophia can be categorized as a condition affecting trophic state rather than a trophic state in itself. Lakes typically are categorized according to the increasing productivity as oligotrophic, mesotrophic, eutrophic, and hypereutrophic. Dystrophic lakes used to be classified as oligotrophic due to their low productivity. However, more recent research shows dystrophia can be associated with any of the trophic types. This is due to a wider possible pH range (acidic 4.0 to more neutral 8.0 on occasion) and other fluctuating properties like nutrient availability and chemical composition. Hydrochemical Dystrophy Index is a scale used to evaluate the dystrophy level of lakes. In 2017, Gorniak proposed a new set of rules for evaluating this index, using properties such as the surface water pH, electric conductivity, and concentrations of dissolved inorganic carbon, and dissolved organic carbon.

== Chemical properties ==
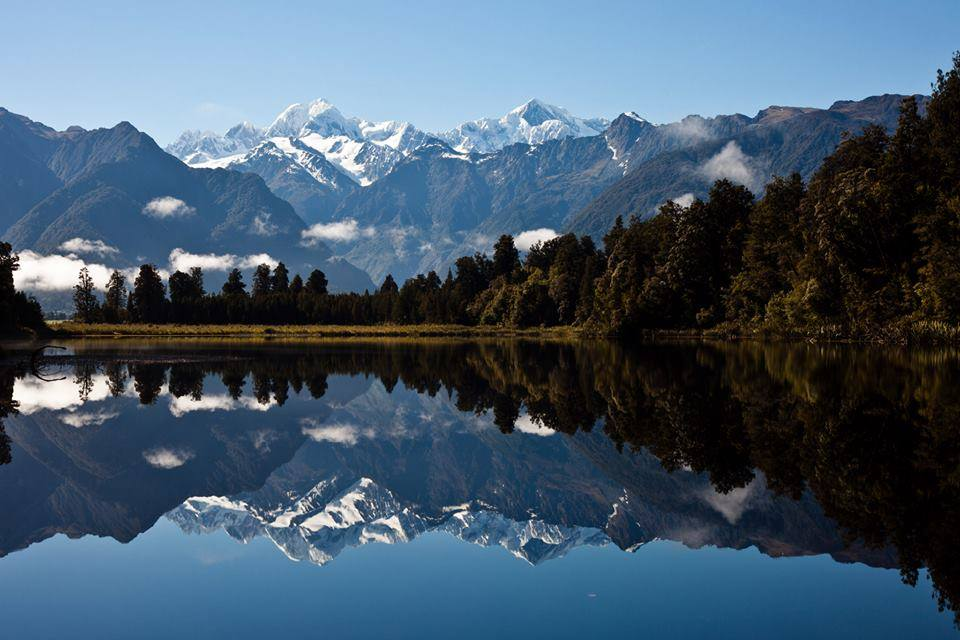
Lake Matheson, a dystrophic lake in New Zealand, has water stained so dark by tannins that its reflection of the nearby Southern Alps has made it a tourist attraction.

Dystrophic lakes have a high level of dissolved organic carbon. This consists of organic carboxylic and phenolic acids, which keep water pH levels relatively stable, possibly by acting as a natural buffer. Therefore, the lake's naturally acidic pH is largely unaffected by industrial emissions. Dissolved organic carbon also reduces the amount of ultraviolet radiation that enters the lake and can reduce the bioavailability of heavy metals by binding them. There is a significantly lower calcium content in the water and sediment of a dystrophic lake when compared with a non-dystrophic lake. Essential fatty acids, like eicosapentaenoic acid (EPA) and docosahexaenoic acid (DHA), are still present in the organisms in humic lakes, but are downgraded in nutritional quality by this acidic environment, resulting low nutritional quality of dystrophic lake's producers, such as phytoplankton.

Because of differing trophic status, some dystrophic lakes may differ strongly in their chemical composition from other dystrophic lakes. Studies of the chemical composition of different types of dystrophic lakes have shown differing levels of dissolved inorganic nitrogen, lipase and glucosidase depending on water color. These attributes make the water unsafe in its raw form to ingest.

== Life in dystrophic lakes ==
The catchment area of a dystrophic lake is usually a coniferous forest rich or an area with peat mosses. Despite the presence of ample nutrients, dystrophic lakes can be considered nutrient-poor, because their nutrients are trapped in organic matter, and therefore are unavailable to primary producers. A considerable amount of the organic matter in dystrophic lakes is allochthonous, meaning it is produced externally to the lake. Due to high amounts of organic matter and lack of light, it is bacterioplankton that control the rate of nutrient flux between the aquatic and terrestrial environments. The bacteria are found in high numbers. These bacteria drive the food web of humic lakes by providing energy and supplying usable forms of organic and inorganic carbon to other organisms, primarily to phagotrophic and mixotrophic flagellates.

Decomposition of organic matter by bacteria also converts organic nitrogen and phosphorus into their inorganic forms, which are then available for uptake by primary producers including both large and small phytoplankton (algae and cyanobacteria). The biological activity of humic lakes is, however, dominated by bacterial metabolism. The chemistry of humic lakes makes it difficult for higher trophic levels such as planktivorous fish to establish themselves, leaving a simplified food web consisting mostly of plants, plankton, and bacteria. The dominance of the bacteria means that dystrophic lakes generally have a higher respiration rate than primary production rate.

== Impacts of dystrophication on a lake ecosystem ==
The formation of a humic lakes via organic runoff has a dramatic effect on the lake ecosystem. Increases in the lake's acidity make it difficult for fish and other organisms to proliferate. The quality of the lake for use as drinking water also decreases as the carbon concentration and acidity increase. The fish that do adapt to the increased acidity may also not be fit for human consumption, due to the organic pollutants.

== Dystrophic lakes and climate change ==
Lakes are commonly known to be important sinks in the carbon cycle. Dystrophic lakes are typically net heterotrophic due to the large amount of bacterial respiration outweighing phytoplankton photosynthesis, meaning that dystrophic lakes are larger carbon sources than clear lakes, emitting carbon into the atmosphere. The elevated levels of allochthonous carbon in humic lakes are due to vegetation in the lake and catchment area, the runoff from which is the main source of organic material. However, changes in these levels can also be attributed to shifts in precipitation, changing forestry practices, reduced sulphate deposition, and changes in temperature. Contemporary climate change is increasing temperature and precipitation in some parts of the world, thus increasing the supply of humic substances to lakes, making them more dystrophic; this process is referred to as "brownification."

== Examples of dystrophic lakes ==
Examples of dystrophic lakes that have been studied by scientists include Lake Suchar II in Poland, lakes Allgjuttern, Fiolen, and Brunnsjön in Sweden, and Lake Matheson in New Zealand.
