= Morse River =

River in New Zealand

Coordinates: 43°43′S 169°39′E

Location
- Country: New Zealand

Physical characteristics
- Source
  - location: Strachan Range
- Mouth
  - location: Mahitahi River
- Length: 10 km (6.2 mi)

The Morse River is a river of the West Coast Region of New Zealand's South Island. It flows generally northwest from its source in the Strachan Range, reaching the Mahitahi River 14 kilometres south of Bruce Bay.

== See also ==
- List of rivers of New Zealand
