= Fayne Robinson =

New Zealand master carver (born 1964)

- Born: Charles Eldon Fayne Robinson; 1964 (age 61–62); Hokitika, New Zealand
- Education: New Zealand Māori Arts and Crafts Institute
- Known for: Māori carving
- Notable work: Public sculptures including Te Pou Herenga Waka, Worcester Boulevard, Christchurch

Charles Eldon Fayne Robinson (born 1964) is a New Zealand Māori artist specialising in carving. Robinson has contributed to the carving of buildings on many marae in New Zealand as well as exhibiting his art in galleries and museums.

== Biography ==
Robinson was born in 1964 and grew up in the South Island town of Hokitika on the West Coast of New Zealand. His iwi are Kāti Māmoe, Kai Tahu, Ngāti Apa Ki Te Rā Tō and Ngāti Porou. Robinson trained in Māori carving at the New Zealand Māori Arts and Crafts Institute, Rotorua and graduated in 1984, He was just 17 when he got accepted, and was one of only four from Ngāi Tahu who have attended. He was influenced to pursue Māori art from meeting the head weaver from the New Zealand Māori Arts and Crafts Institute, Emily Schuster, when he was younger.

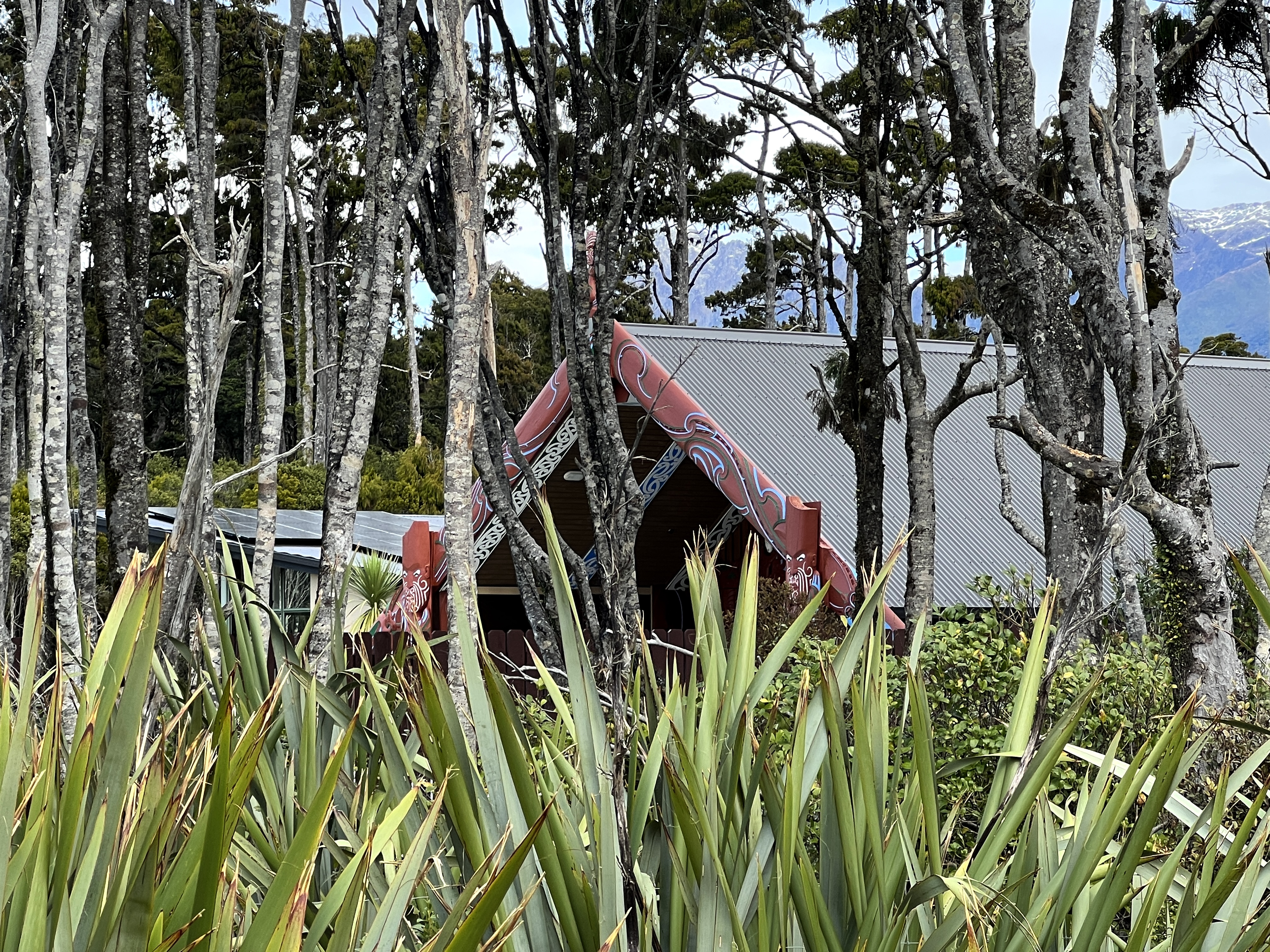
Kaipō, the wharenui at Te Tauraka Waka a Māui Marae, glimpsed through the trees

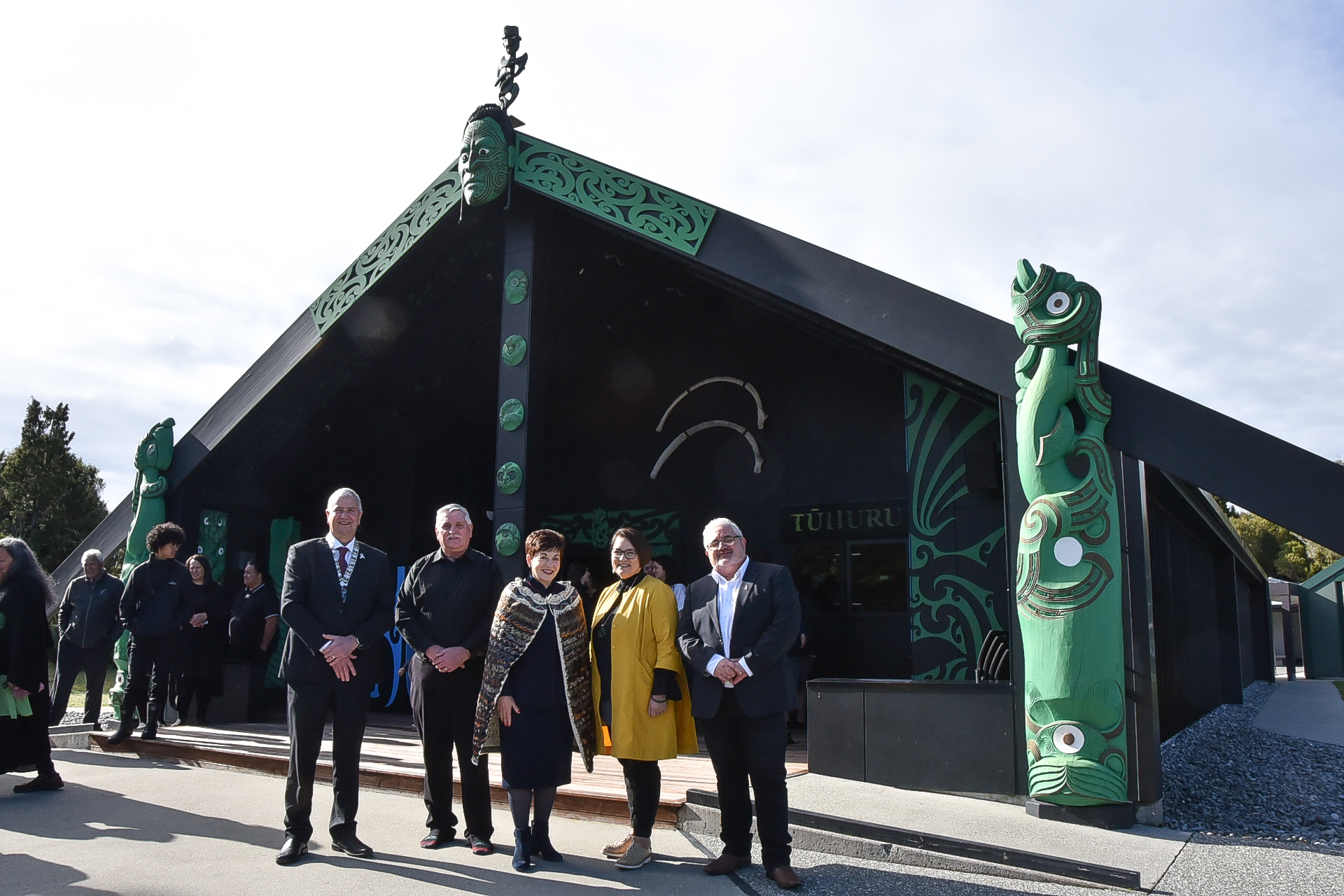
The wharenui, Tūhuru, at Arahura Marae, after a pōwhiri during a vice-regal visit in 2020

Robinson has carved on meeting houses and at marae, including Te Tauraka Waka a Māui Marae in Bruce Bay, completed in 2005, and Arahura Marae near Hokitika, completed in 2013. The New Zealand national museum Te Papa Tongarewa holds four of his works in their collections.

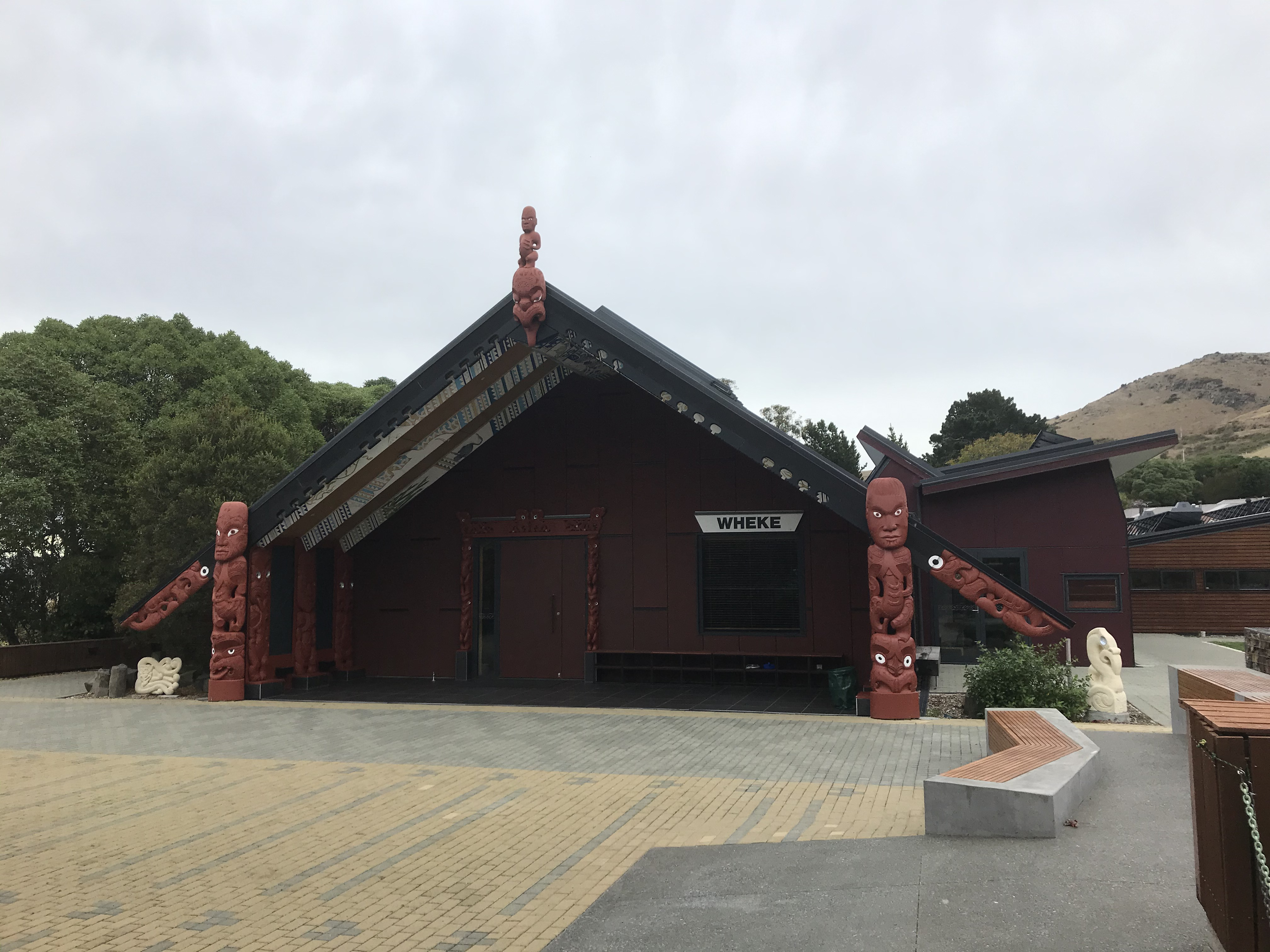
Te Wheke, wharenui at Te Rāpaki-o-Te Rakiwhakaputa

== Works and exhibitions ==
=== Wharenui as master carver ===
- 2005 – Kaipō, Te Tauraka Waka a Māui Marae, Bruce Bay
- 2010 – Wheke, Rāpaki (Te Wheke) Marae, Te Rāpaki-o-Te Rakiwhakaputa (with Riki Manuel)
- 2013 – Tūhuru, Arahura Marae, Arahura

=== Exhibitions ===
- 2003 – Kiwa-Pacific Connections, Vancouver, Canada, group exhibition
- 2014 – Matatoki: Contemporary Māori Carving, group exhibition developed by Rotorua Museum
- 2017 – Ka Nohoaka Toi, Toi Moaraki CoCA, Christchurch, group exhibition sponsored by Te Rūnanga o Ngāi Tahu
- 2019 – Kura Pounamu: Our Treasured Stone, group exhibition curated by Te Papa Tongarewa

=== Public installations ===
- 2010 – Te Pou Herenga Waka, Christchurch Civic Building, Worcester Boulevard, Christchurch
- 2013 – Te Kaiwhakatere o Te Raki, pouwhenua, Scott Base, Antarctica
- 2017 – Pounamu sculpture, Hanmer Springs Thermal Pools and Spa, Canterbury (with Caleb Robinson)
- 2018 – Tāwhaki, Tūranga, Christchurch (with Caleb Robinson)
- 2018 – Kāhui Whatu, Tūranga, Christchurch
- 2019 – Mana Motuhake, Victoria Square, Christchurch
- 2020 – Carved memorial stone, Jacobs River
- 2022 – Woolston Village pou, six pou, Woolston
- 2022 – Pou Tū te Raki o Te Maiharanui, Takapūneke, Banks Peninsula
- 2022 – Te Kopikopiko o Te Waka, Gillespies Beach Road
- 2023 – Kauawhi, temporary installation at the Bridge of Remembrance, Christchurch; to be permanently installed at Kahurangi, the new youth mental health facility at Hillmorton Hospital, in 2024
- 2024 – Te Arawhiti ki Matangi Āwhio, balustrade to bridge spanning Saltwater Creek, Nelson
- 2026 – Aorere Ararau, 22-metre-long (72 ft) suspended waka in the Nelson airport terminal
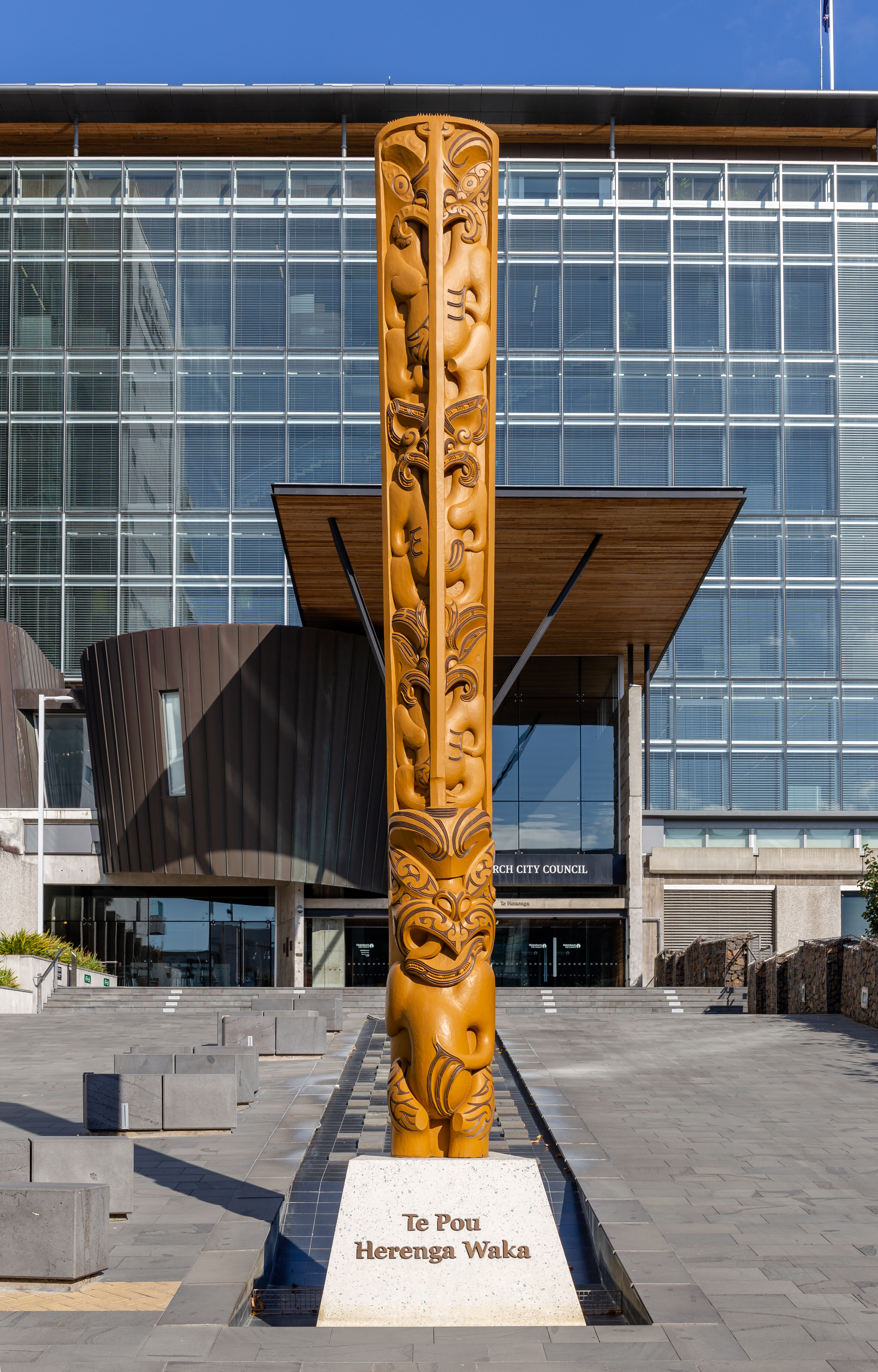
Te Pou Herenga Waka, Worcester Boulevard, Christchurch

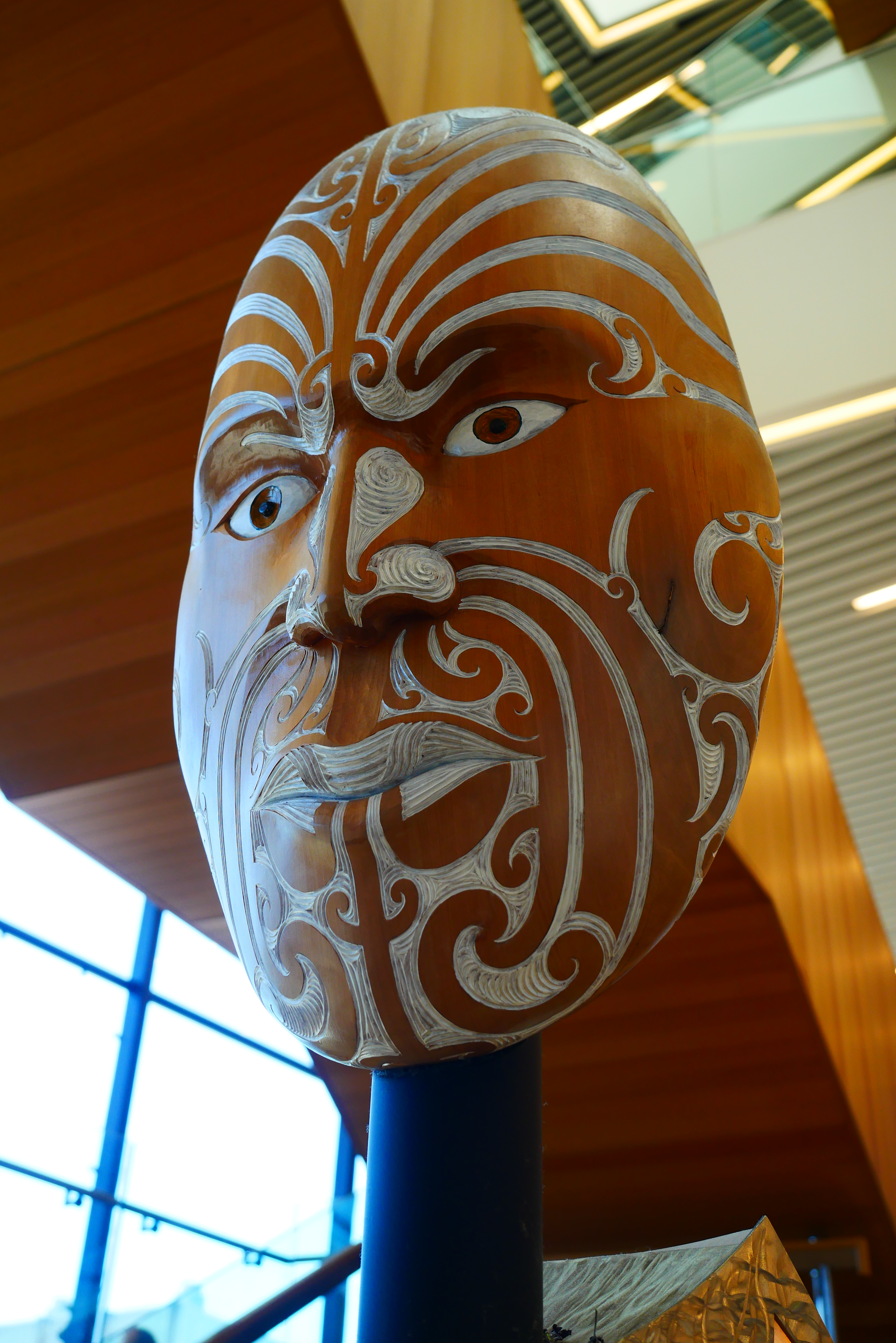
Head of Tāwhaki, Tūranga, Christchurch

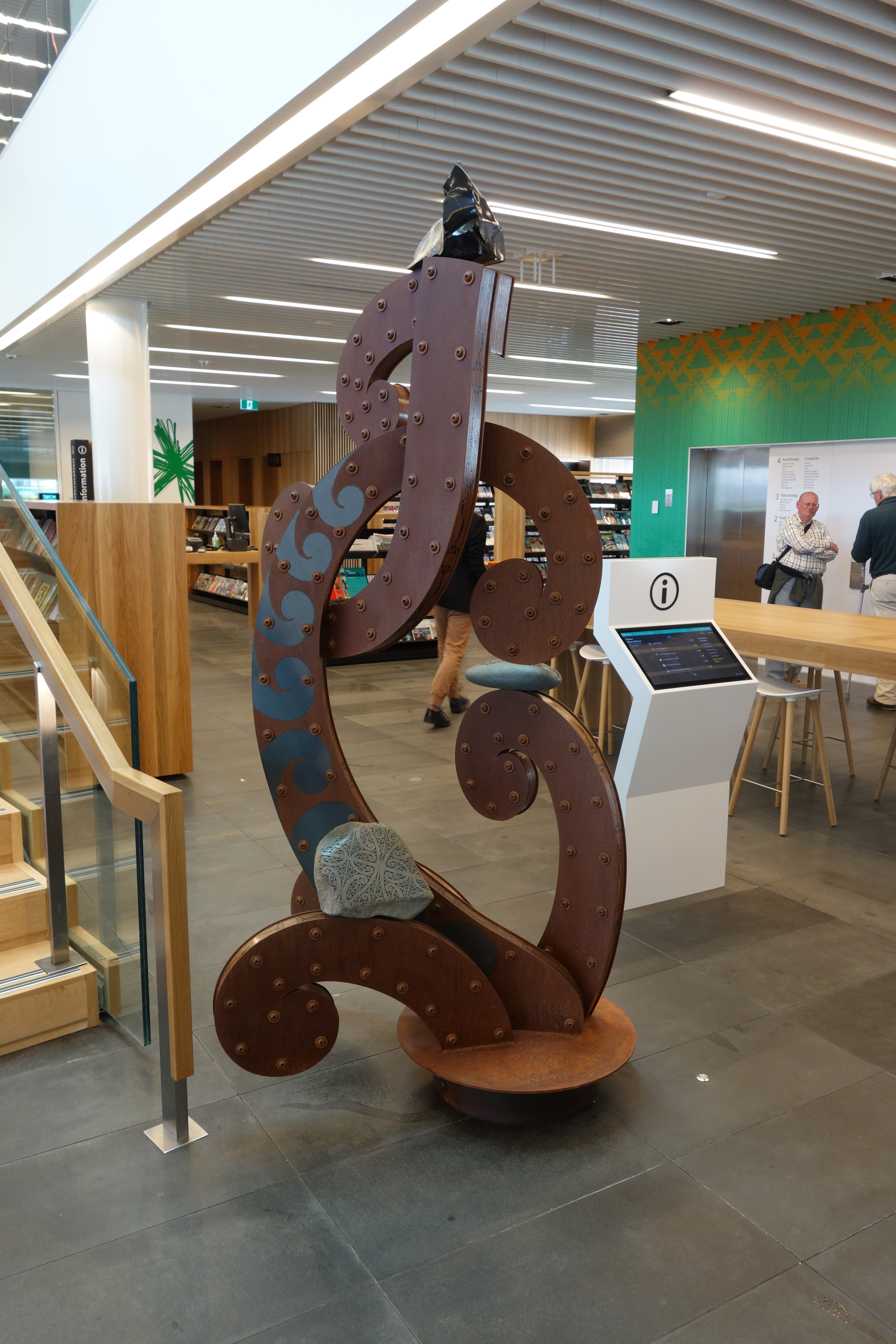
Kāhui Whatu, Tūranga, Christchurch

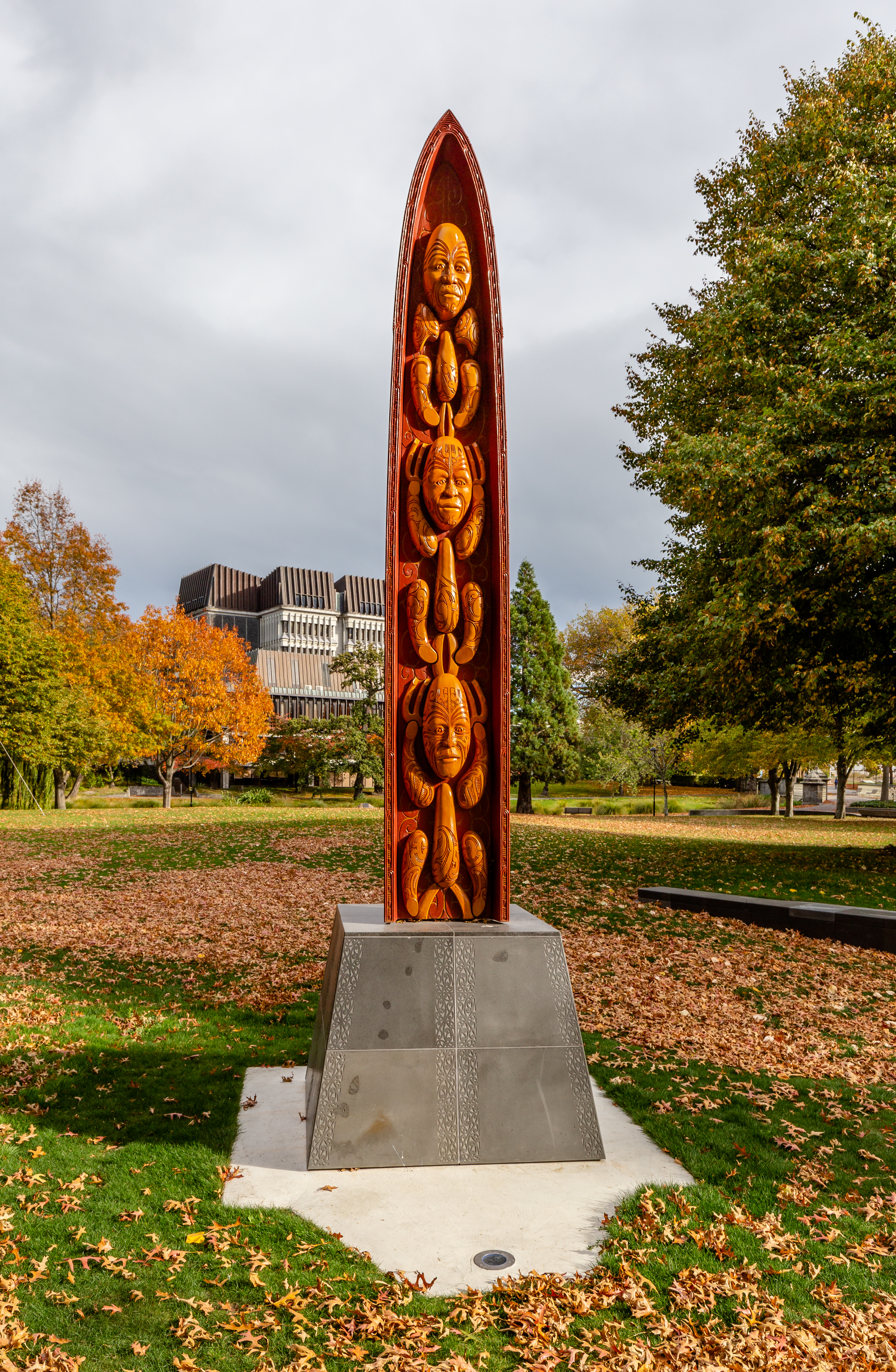
Mana Motuhake, Victoria Square, Christchurch

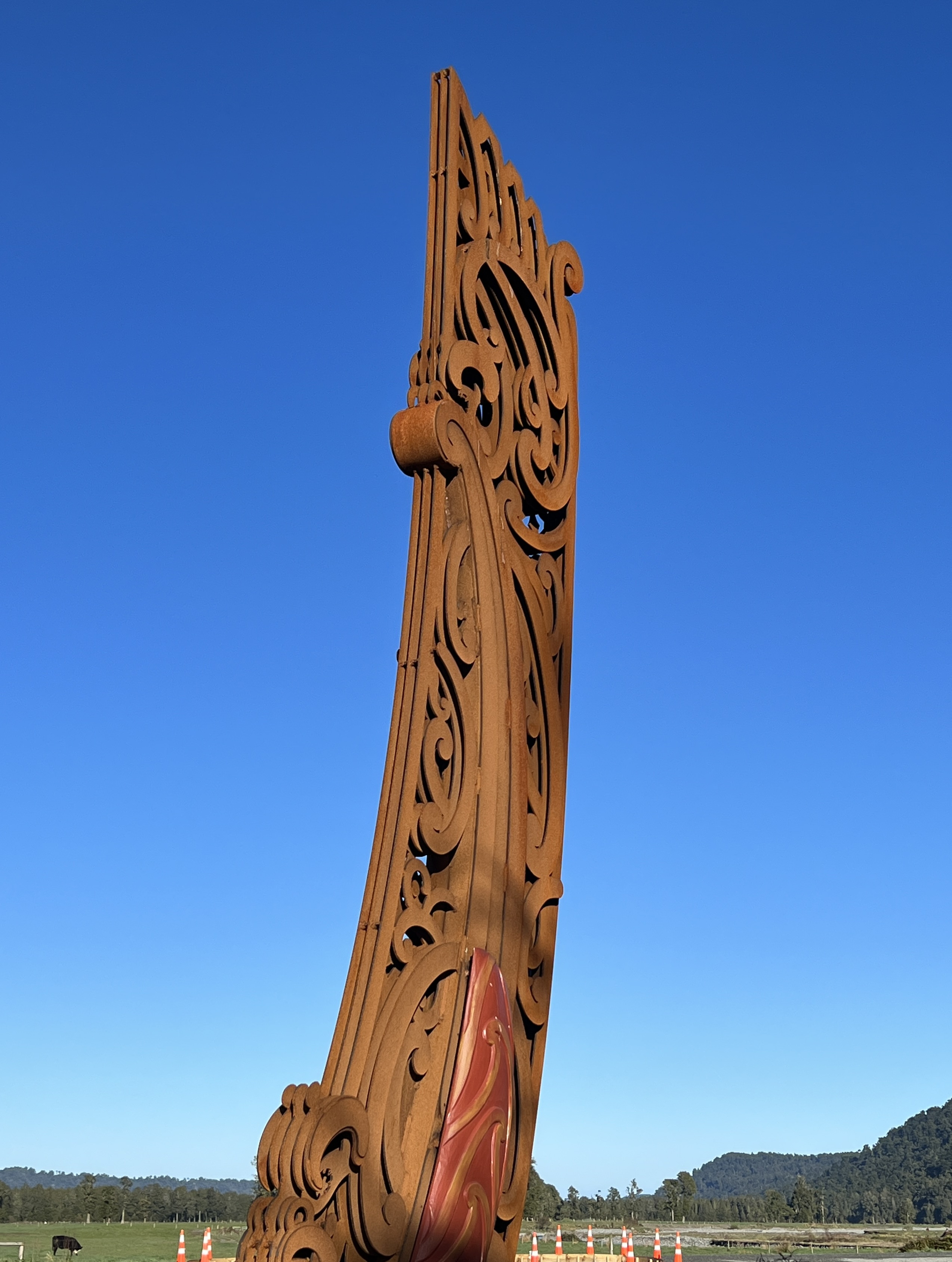
Te Kopikopiko o Te Waka, Gillespies Beach Road, South Westland

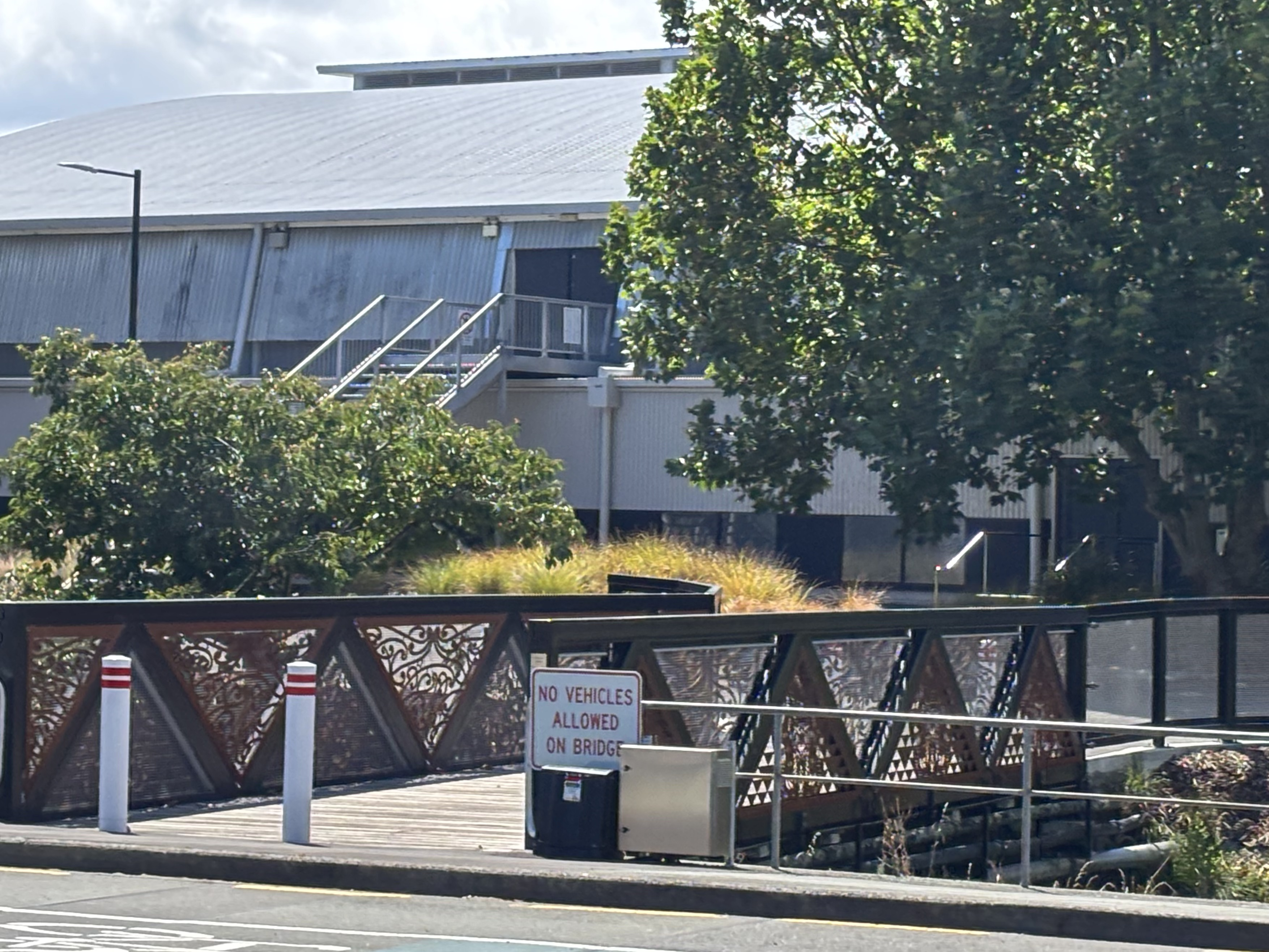
Te Arawhiti ki Matangi Āwhio, footbridge balustrade, Nelson

=== Other ===
- 2017 – Crozier for Richard Wallace, second Pīhopa o Te Waipounamu
- 2018 – Design of Manly Warringah Sea Eagles jersey, worn by Manly for matches played in Christchurch
- 2018 – Te Ātanga, Broadhurst–Shelford Trophy, contested in NRL matches between Manly Warringah and the New Zealand Warriors
- 2023 – Design of Tahutahi pounamu pendants (with Rānui Ngārimu) for the 2024 New Zealand Olympic team
