= Wainui (surname) =

Wainui is a surname. Notable people with the surname include:

- Āni Wainui, New Zealand educator
- Sean Wainui (1995–2021), New Zealand rugby union player
