= Butler Te Koeti =

New Zealand mountaineer, guide, bushman, axeman (1883–1964)

Personal information
- Full name: Pahikore Te Koeti Tūranga
- Born: 18 November 1883; Makaawhio Pā, New Zealand
- Died: 13 March 1964 (aged 80); Hokitika, New Zealand
- Relative(s): Joseph Fluerty (nephew); Rex Austin (great-nephew)

Pahikore Te Koeti Tūranga (18 November 1883 – 13 March 1964), also known as John Butler Te Koeti, was a notable New Zealand mountaineer, guide, bushman, axeman. Of Māori descent, he identified with the Ngāi Tahu and Kāti Māmoe iwi. He was born at Makaawhio Pā, West Coast, New Zealand in 1883.

He died in Hokitika in 1964 and was buried in Hokitika Cemetery.
