= 2015 Fox Glacier helicopter crash =

Aviation accident in New Zealand

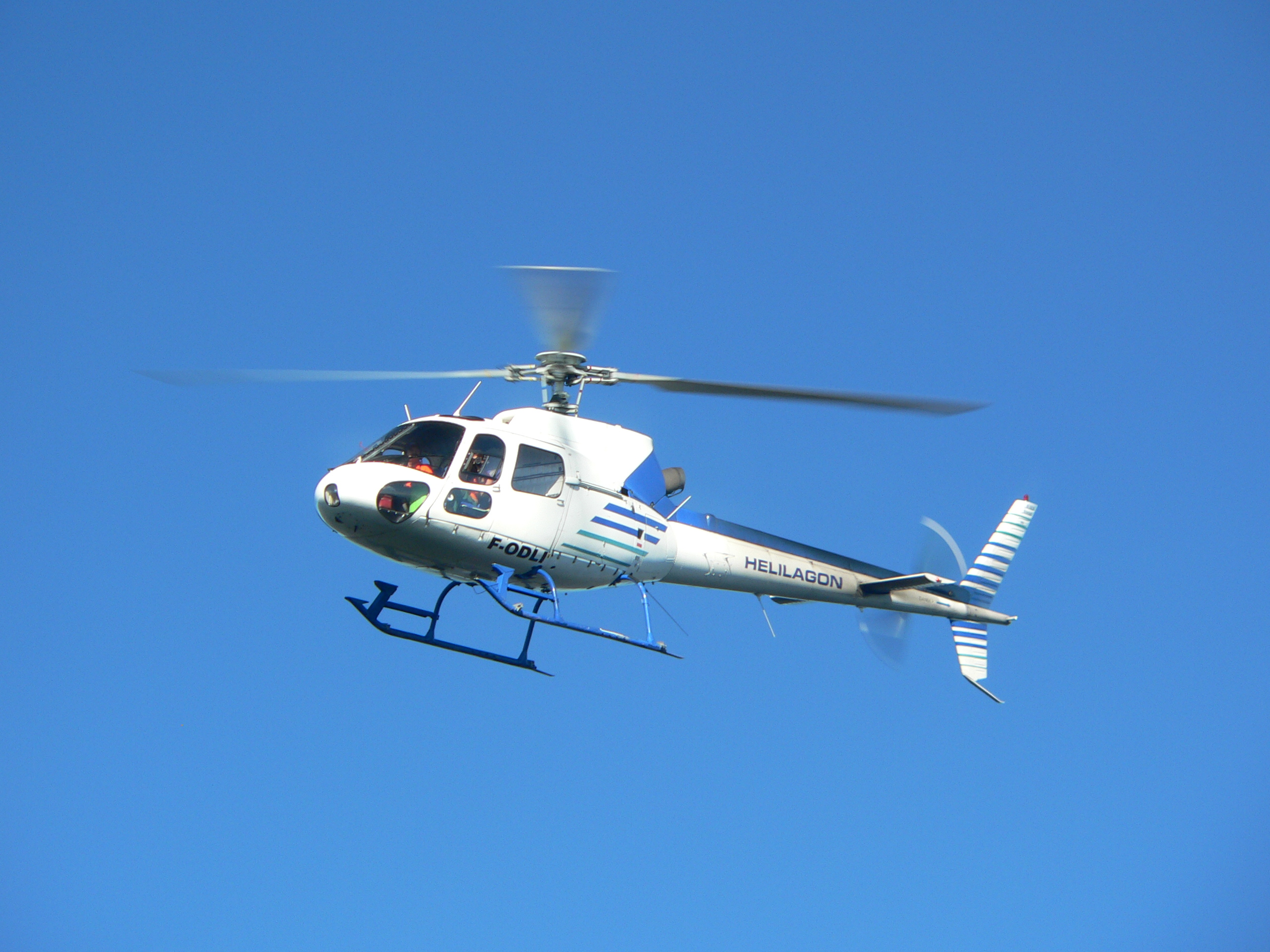
- Example of a Eurocopter AS350, similar to the one involved in the accident

Accident
- Date: 21 November 2015
- Summary: Excessive weight and adverse weather, aggravated by insufficient training.
- Site: Fox Glacier, New Zealand; 43.513°S 170.1°E

Aircraft
- Aircraft type: Eurocopter AS350 D Astar
- Operator: Alpine Adventures
- Registration: ZK-HKU
- Flight origin: Fox Glacier Aerodrome
- Destination: Fox Glacier Aerodrome
- Occupants: 7
- Passengers: 6
- Crew: 1
- Fatalities: 7
- Survivors: 0

On 21 November 2015, a Eurocopter AS350 Astar helicopter, operated by Alpine Adventures on a sightseeing flight, crashed on Fox Glacier in the South Island of New Zealand. All seven people on board died.

== Alpine Adventures ==
Alpine Adventures was the owner and operator of the former Christchurch Helicopters AS-350D Astar helicopter. James Patrick Scott was the company's owner and had over 30 years of experience operating helicopters, and the company was a member of the Aviation Industry Association and the Mt Cook & Westland National Parks User Aviation Group.

A few months before the Fox Glacier crash on 27 June 2015, another Alpine Adventures helicopter, a Hughes 369 carrying two hunters and piloted by Brad Maclachlan, crashed near Hari Hari. Maclachlan was seriously injured and the two hunters on board had minor injuries.

== Previous history ==
The Eurocopter AS350D Astar (CN 1132) was built in 1979. Registered as N3598F, it had been based in the United States from its construction until 1995 when it was sold to a New Zealand company by RTS Aircraft Services Corp of Montvale, New Jersey.

While flown in the United States, on 21 July 1990 ZK-HKU struck telephone lines while hovering about a meter above the ground. The main rotor blades severed the lines which then became entangled in the tail rotor causing its blade to snap and separating the rotor gearbox and tail boom from the helicopter.

On 19 April 1998 ZK-HKU had been involved in an emergency landing at Rotorua. It had suffered an engine failure. According to the air accident report the pilot made an autorotational landing onto uneven terrain. No one was injured but during the heavy landing its skid landing gear, tail boom and main rotor blades were damaged.

Before being sold to Alpine Helicopters it had been owned by Christchurch Helicopters

== Accident ==
At the time of the crash (about 11 am NZDT), the weather was reported to be heavily overcast and raining. The aircraft crashed into a crevasse approximately 2,500 metres (8,200 ft) up Fox Glacier. According to Alpine Adventures' quality assurance manager, Barry Waterland, the helicopter crashed just after taking off from the glacier at a designated spot called The Chancellor. When the helicopter was reported as being overdue the pilot's flatmate, Thomas Darling, took another helicopter up to try to find them. On finding the crash site, Darling alerted the rescue coordination centre and an emergency service helicopter flew up to the crash site. Police Inspector John Canning told the media that the emergency service helicopter crews saw no sign of life, They had to return to Fox Glacier village as the weather was too bad for them to land.

Early reports based on the size of the debris field and scorch marks in the hillside above the crash site were thought to indicate that the helicopter had crashed before falling into the glacier. The helicopter did not have a transponder or black box. No mayday call was made suggesting a sudden catastrophic event.

There were six passengers, all tourists, on board, four British and two Australians. In 2017, Addenbrooke's Hospital, Cambridge, England named a Radiosurgery Suite at the hospital after one of the victims.

== Pilot ==
The pilot, 28-year-old New Zealand citizen Mitchell Paul Gameren, was described as "experienced" with over 3,000 hours of flying. He had had flying experience in both Malaysia and Botswana. Gameren's interest in flying began when he was five, when his mother worked at Southern Lakes Helicopters. He was able to fly fixed-wing aircraft by the time he was 17 and then began flying helicopters. From 2011 to 2014, he flew helicopters in Botswana.

== Recovery operations ==
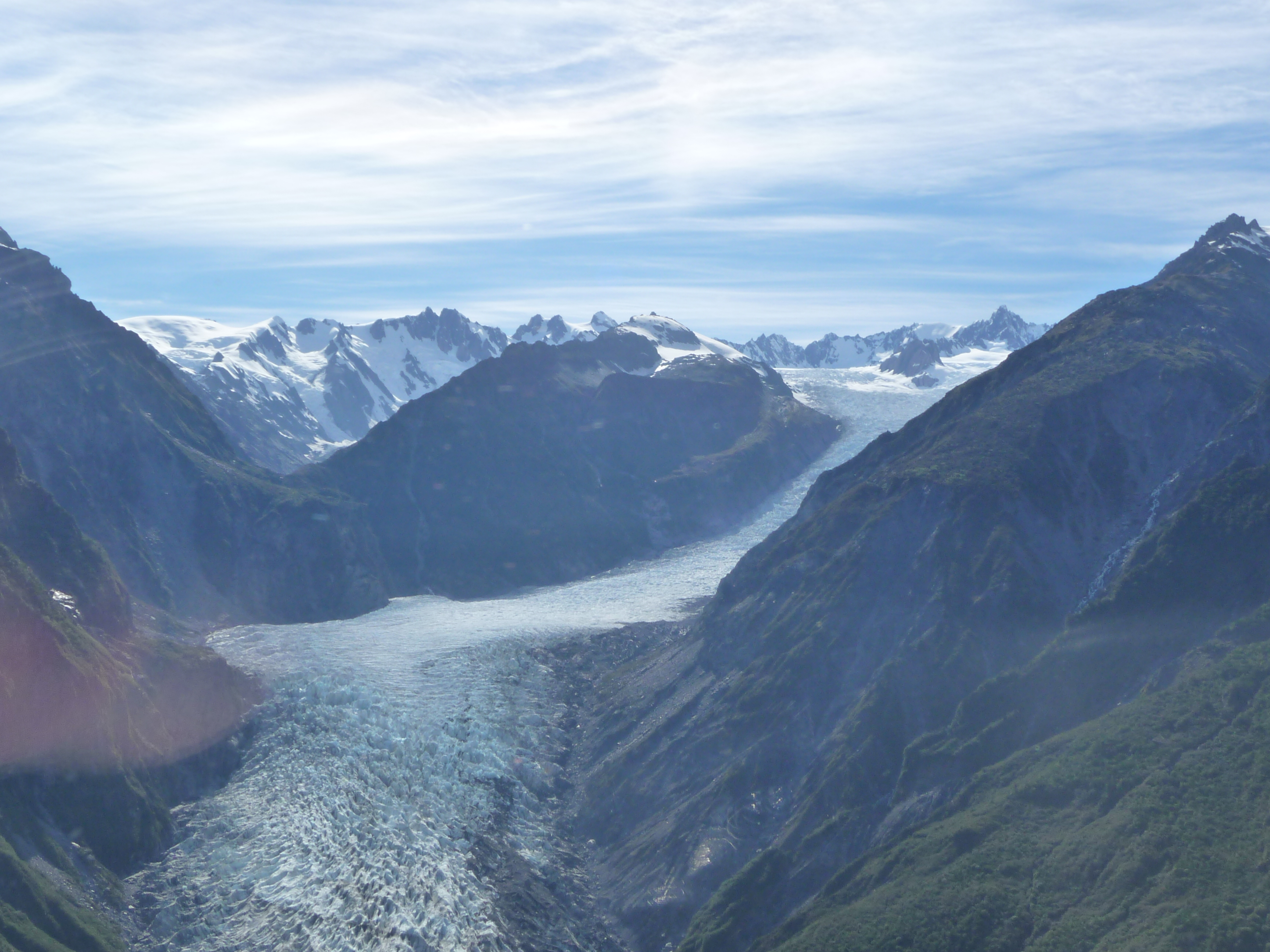
Fox Glacier

The day following the crash four bodies were recovered from the site, but operations were suspended due to worsening weather conditions. The police announced that a further attempt would be made on Wednesday that week. The area where the helicopter crashed was described as highly treacherous, uneven, and moving ice, with 20-metre crevasses. The blocks of ice were described as bigger than buildings. On 24 November police announced that post-mortem procedures on the four recovered victims had been completed and that they consisted of three women and a man.

The weather cleared for an hour on 25 November allowing recovery teams consisting of Police, Alpine Cliff Rescue, and drone operators to land on the glacier. The drone then filmed the site before the weather again closed in. The remaining three bodies and most of the wreckage were recovered from the crash site on 26 November.

In late March 2016 more helicopter parts were recovered from the crash site by professional mountaineers employed by the Transport Accident Investigation Commission (TAIC). The parts had become visible due to snow melt during the summer months.

The body of one of the British women was found on the glacier on 2 March 2017 and formally identified on 15 March 2017.

== Crash investigation ==
In November 2015 TAIC advised that it could take until May 2017 for its Chief investigator of accidents Captain Tim Burfoot to complete the investigation into the cause of the crash. The recovered wreckage of the helicopter was taken to TAIC's Wellington site for evaluation. The father of one of the victims of the 2010 New Zealand Fletcher FU24 crash expressed a lack of confidence in TAIC's ability to properly investigate the crash based on destruction of evidence from that crash and New Zealand's lax approach to air safety.

The helicopter engine was sent to its United States manufacturer for inspection under TAIC's investigators supervision. Flight control components were sent to Australia for testing and inspecting and a team from the helicopters French manufacturer have also inspected the wreckage held in Wellington. A draft report was being prepared in March 2017.

Local news reports stated that the Civil Aviation Authority of New Zealand (CAA) had received a complaint a few days prior to the crash about the lack of landing markers on the glacier.

The TAIC report into the crash was released on 23 May 2019, and found that the helicopter struck the glacier surface with a high forward speed and a high rate of descent, the all-up weight of the helicopter almost certainly exceeded the maximum permitted weight, the weather conditions on the day were unstable and unsuitable for conducting a scenic flight and the localised weather conditions in the area were very likely to have been frequently below the minimum criteria required. The investigation determined that there was no apparent fault with the helicopter and cited the operator's pilot training system as not fully prepare the pilot for his role. TAIC also found that "the Civil Aviation Authority (CAA) identified significant non-compliances with the operator's training system and with managerial oversight prior to the accident but did not intervene and the operator was allowed to continue providing helicopter air operations."

== Health and safety concerns ==
At 4:30pm on Friday, 28 May 2016 the CAA suspended the Air operator's certificate of James Patrick Scott of Alpine Adventures over operational safety concerns. CAA Director Graeme Harris said, "The action taken did not in any way pre-determine the outcome of the investigation [into the 2015 helicopter crash] to be carried out". Scott operated Fox and Franz Heliservices, Tekapo Helicopters, and Makarora Helicopters. TAIC advised that its investigation into the crash was now up to analyzing the environment and Alpine Adventures. The Air Operating Certificate was issued by CAA to the renamed entity, Fox-Franz Heliservices in September.

Scott and his Organisational System Manager Barry Waterland had been charged by CAA on 3 June 2016 under Health and Safety legislation at the Greymouth District Court. The case was to be called on 12 July, but was adjourned until early September. By 6 July the CAA advised that the operating licence of James Patrick Scott had been surrendered. Scott and Waterland plead not guilty to the Health and Safety charges, with them being remanded until 30 September. The case was still to be heard when a further body was found in March 2017.

In July 2017 the General Aviation Advocacy Group of New Zealand (GAA) raised concerns about the CAA flight operations inspector, Paul Mitchell Jones, who was involved in the investigation into the crash. Jones had overstated his qualifications in his CV and there were serious concerns about his work. In October 2017 TAIC advised the new Minister of Transport that they were now writing up the report on the accident.

Over two years after the initial Health and Safety charges were brought against Scott and Waterland, in September 2018, CAA and the Greymouth District Court advised that a hearing was scheduled for 28 November to set pre-trial and trial dates. On 17 May 2019 a $64,000 fine was imposed on the pair by the Court. The paper also noted that Scott had paid $125,000 to each of the families whose members had died in the crash. The judge said that the health and safety failings did not cause the crash.

== See also ==
- 2010 Fox Glacier FU-24 crash
