= Rāpaki =

Settlement in Christchurch City, New Zealand

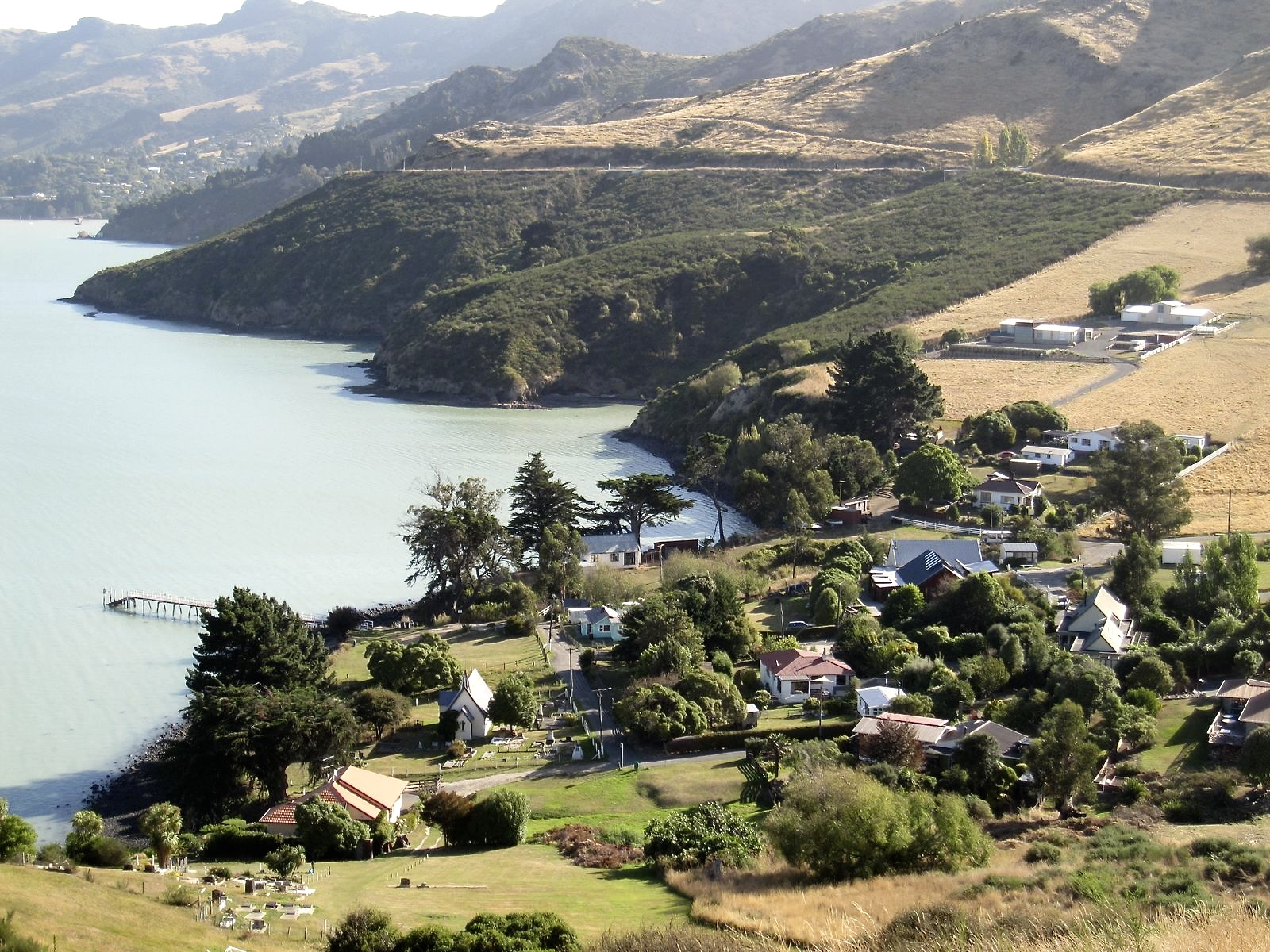
- View of Rāpaki from the north
- Interactive map of Rāpaki
- Coordinates: 43.6040°S 172.6795°E
- Country: New Zealand
- Region: Canterbury
- Local authority: Christchurch City Council
- Ward: Banks Peninsula
- Community: Te Pātaka o Rākaihautū Banks Peninsula
- Electorates: Banks Peninsula; Te Tai Tonga (Māori)

Government
  - Territorial Authority: Christchurch City Council
  - Regional council: Environment Canterbury
  - Mayor of Christchurch: Phil Mauger
  - Banks Peninsula MP: Vanessa Weenink
  - Te Tai Tonga MP: Tākuta Ferris

Area
  - Total: 0.40 km^{2} (0.15 sq mi)

Population (2023 census)
  - Total: 87
  - Density: 220/km^{2} (560/sq mi)
- Postcode: 8971

Te Rāpaki-o-Te Rakiwhakaputa, commonly known as Rāpaki or Rapaki, is a small settlement within the Lyttelton Harbour basin.

Rāpaki is one of four Banks Peninsula rūnanga (communities) based around marae (tribal meeting grounds). The Rāpaki Marae, also known as Te Wheke Marae, is a meeting ground of Ngāi Tahu and its Hapū o Ngāti Wheke branch. Its wharenui (meeting house), called Te Wheke, opened in 2008, was carved by Riki Manuel and Fayne Robinson, with tukutuku panels overseen by local weaver 'Aunty' Doe Parata. The carvings of the wharenui trace the almost 400 years of continuous settlement related to the arrival of the ancestor Te Rakiwhakaputa.

Rāpaki is overlooked by the peak Te Poho o Tamatea. According to one legend, the Ngāi Tahu chief Te Rakiwhakaputa named the place by laying his waist mat (rāpaki) down to claim it. The full name of Rāpaki is Te Rāpaki-o-Te Rakiwhakaputa, meaning the waist mat of Te Rakiwhakaputa. On 8 July 2020, the New Zealand Geographic Board assigned the full name as the official name of the locality.

== Demographics ==
Rāpaki covers 0.40 km^{2} (0.15 sq mi). It is part of the larger Lyttelton statistical area.

Historical population
| Year | Pop. | ±% p.a. |
|---|---|---|
| 2006 | 120 | — |
| 2013 | 99 | −2.71% |
| 2018 | 90 | −1.89% |
| 2023 | 87 | −0.68% |

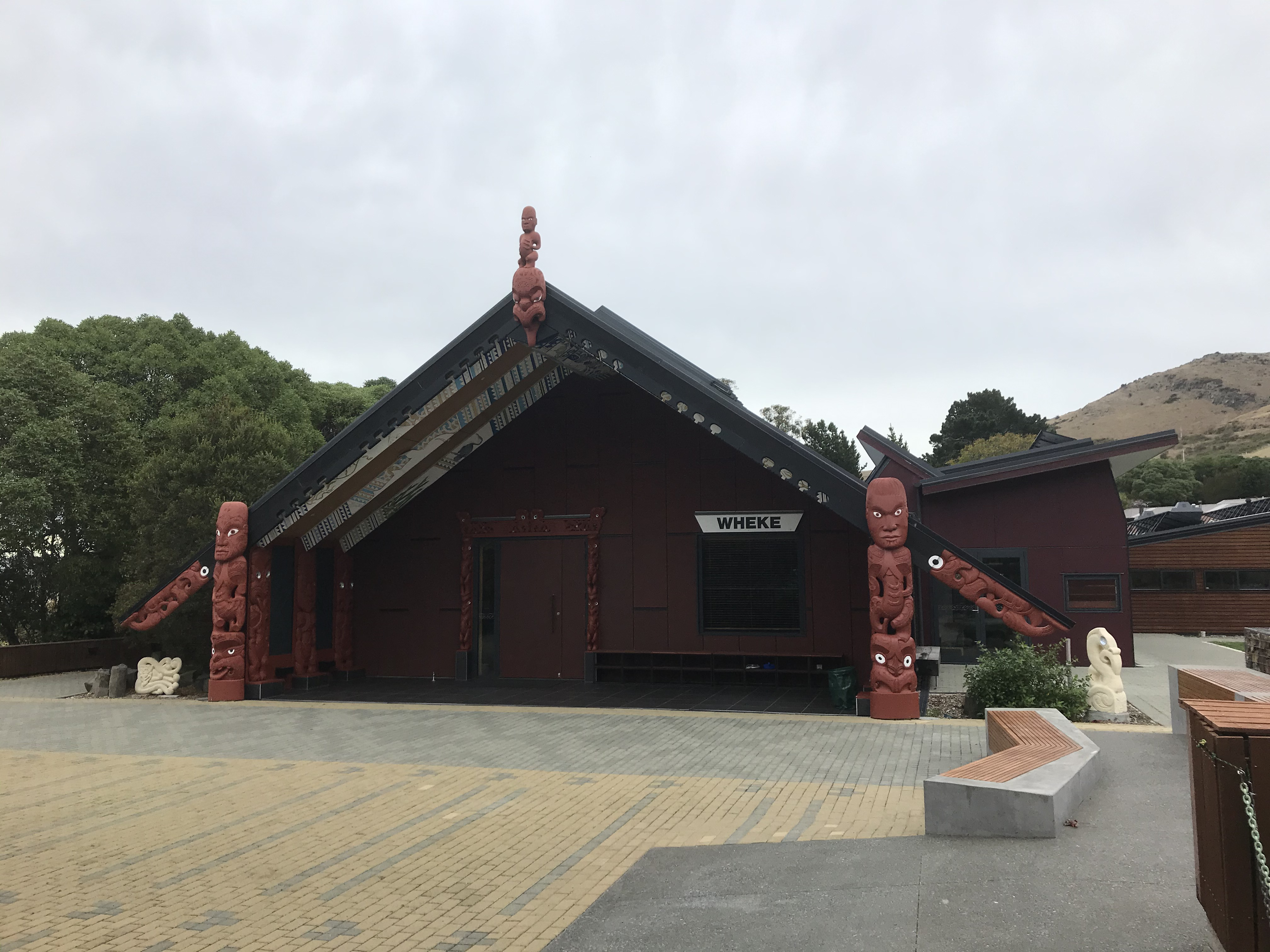
Te Wheke wharenui at Rapaki Marae

Rāpaki had a population of 87 in the 2023 New Zealand census, a decrease of 3 people (−3.3%) since the 2018 census, and a decrease of 12 people (−12.1%) since the 2013 census. There were 48 males and 39 females in 39 dwellings. The median age was 60.2 years (compared with 38.1 years nationally). There were 3 people (3.4%) aged under 15 years, 12 (13.8%) aged 15 to 29, 39 (44.8%) aged 30 to 64, and 30 (34.5%) aged 65 or older.

People could identify as more than one ethnicity. The results were 44.8% European (Pākehā), 75.9% Māori, and 3.4% Pasifika. English was spoken by 96.6%, Māori by 24.1%, and other languages by 3.4%. The percentage of people born overseas was 17.2, compared with 28.8% nationally.

Religious affiliations were 37.9% Christian, and 13.8% Māori religious beliefs. People who answered that they had no religion were 34.5%, and 6.9% of people did not answer the census question.

Of those at least 15 years old, 21 (25.0%) people had a bachelor's or higher degree, 42 (50.0%) had a post-high school certificate or diploma, and 24 (28.6%) people exclusively held high school qualifications. The median income was $32,200, compared with $41,500 nationally. 15 people (17.9%) earned over $100,000 compared to 12.1% nationally. The employment status of those at least 15 was 30 (35.7%) full-time and 15 (17.9%) part-time.
