= Āni Wainui =

New Zealand educator

Āni Wainui ONZM
- Awards: Officer of the New Zealand Order of Merit

Academic work
- Institutions: Aurora College, Te Wharekura o Arowhenua

Āni Pātene Gazala Wainui ONZM is a New Zealand teacher and Māori language advocate. In 2020 Wainui was appointed an Officer of the New Zealand Order of Merit for services to Māori language education.

== Early life and education ==
Wainui was born in Cape Runaway in the Bay of Plenty. She moved to Southland with her husband in 1965, where she was the first itinerant teacher of Māori.

== Career ==
Wainui is a teacher in mainstream and kura kaupapa (Māori language immersion) schools. Having first been an itinerant teacher at primary schools, Wainui then taught at Cargill High School in Invercargill until 1989. Wainui attended a bilingual course in Hamilton and saw a kura kaupapa in action. She was inspired to form the South Island's second kura kaupapa Māori at Murihiku Marae, Te Wharekura o Arowhenua. Wainui had four children, and while the older three had gone through mainstream schooling, she said "while they were successful, they missed out on fully learning te reo Maori and Maori culture." Te Wharekura o Arowhenua was set up to give Wainui's youngest child a different experience, with Wainui saying "I wanted her to grow up in the language knowing who she was.". Wainui did not have support from the wider community or the Ministry of Education, and struggled to find a school to accommodate the kura, as existing schools were worried about the scrutiny it might bring from the ministry. Support from local kaumatua led to Wainui being donated space at Murihiku Marae and the kura, originally named Te Kura Kaupapa Māori o Arowhenua, opened in 1989.

The school was formally recognised by the Ministry of Education in 1991 or 1992. Wainui was the school's principal for twenty-eight years until 2017, during which time the roll grew from 35 to 160 pupils. Her youngest daughter later became a teacher at Te Wharekura o Arowhenua.

Wainui was a board member of the national body representing teachers at kura kaupapa, Te Runanga Nui o nga Kura Kaupapa Māori Te Aho Matua o Aotearoa, since 1993, and chair.

Wainui translated a children's book by Maris O'Rourke and Claudia Pond Eyley, Te Haerenga Māia a Riripata i Te Araroa, which was a finalist for the Te Kura Pounamu Award in the New Zealand Book Awards in 2017.

Wainui is an Archdeacon in the Anglican Church, Te Huiamorangi o Te Waipounamu.

== Honours and awards ==
in the 2020 Queen's Birthday Honours Wainui was appointed an Officer of the New Zealand Order of Merit for services to Māori language education. Wainui was a finalist in the Te Ururangi Award for Education section of Māori Television's Matariki Awards in 2020.
