= Susan Wallace (bishop) =

New Zealand Māori Anglican bishop

Susan Wallace is a New Zealand Māori Anglican bishop. Since 2026, she has been bishop of Te Pīhopatanga o Te Waipounamu, a diocese of the Anglican Church in Aotearoa, New Zealand and Polynesia. She was consecrated a bishop on 6 June 2026, during a service at the Cardboard Cathedral, Christchurch. She is the Church's second female Māori bishop and she wears a moko kauae. She is the daughter of Richard Wallace, who was the former bishop of Te Pīhopatanga o Te Waipounamu.
