= 2010 Fox Glacier FU-24 crash =

Aeroplane crash in New Zealand

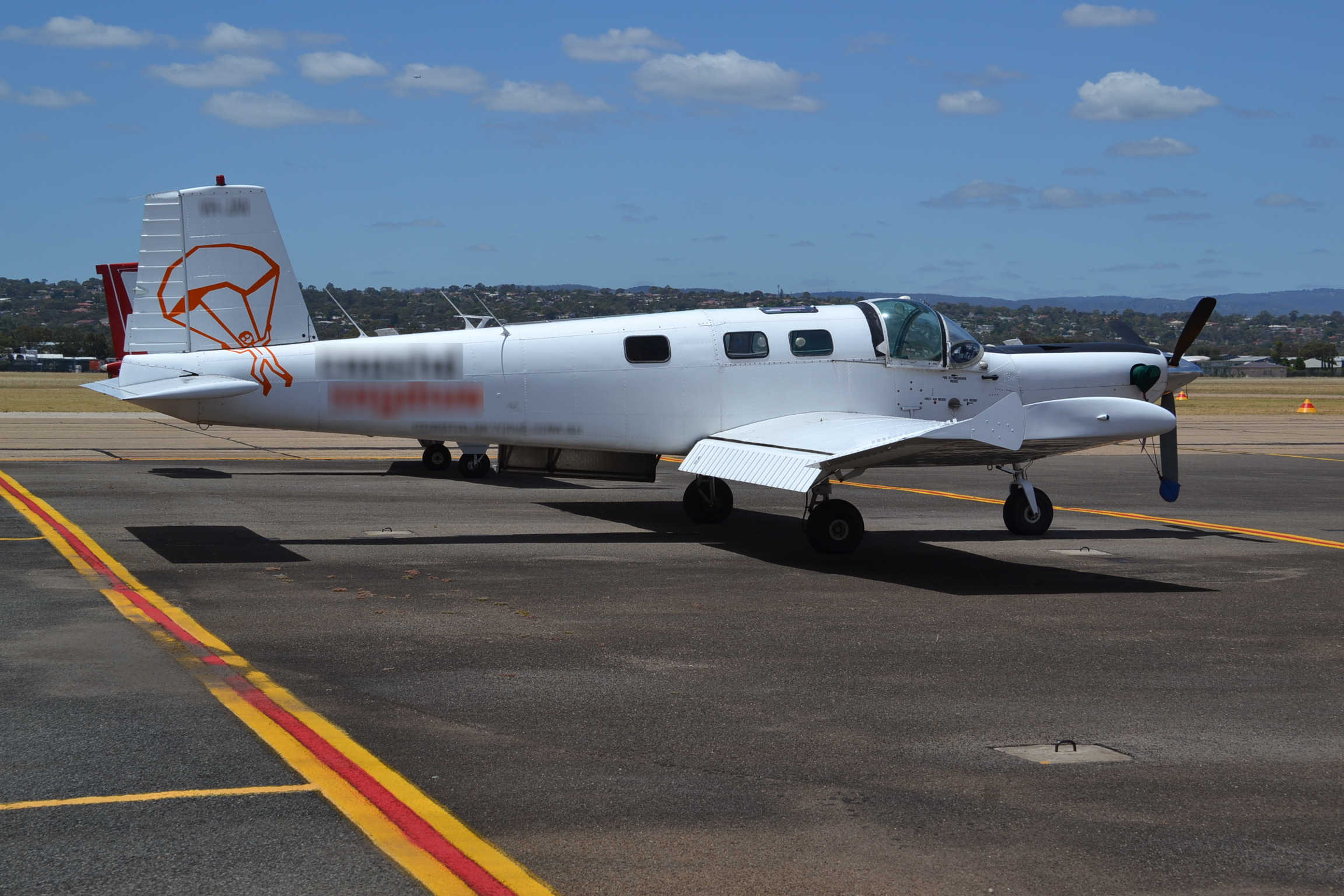
- A Fletcher FU-24 adapted for skydiving similar to the accident aircraft

Accident
- Date: 4 September 2010
- Summary: Excessive pitch-up during take-off leading to a stall, cause undetermined
- Site: Fox Glacier Aerodrome, New Zealand; 43°27′39″S 170°00′53″E

Aircraft
- Aircraft type: Fletcher FU-24
- Operator: Skydive New Zealand
- Registration: ZK-EUF
- Flight origin: Fox Glacier Aerodrome, New Zealand
- Destination: Fox Glacier Aerodrome, New Zealand
- Occupants: 9
- Passengers: 4
- Crew: 5
- Fatalities: 9
- Survivors: 0

On 4 September 2010, a modified Fletcher FU-24 agricultural aeroplane on a parachuting flight from Fox Glacier Aerodrome, New Zealand, crashed shortly after take-off, killing all nine people on board.

The subsequent investigation concluded that the most significant factor contributing to the accident was the weight and balance configuration on the accident flight, which resulted in the aircraft's centre of gravity being located beyond its rear limit, leading to loss of control immediately after lift-off. After the report was released, additional inquiries identified problems with the way that the accident investigation had been conducted, leading to public criticism. Responding to the public pressure, the commission that investigated the accident reviewed the circumstances and findings of the original investigation, and released an amended report that acknowledged that the true cause of the crash could not be determined, in part due to mishandling of the original investigation. As a result, new policies were implemented to improve the quality, transparency, and expertise of air accident investigations in New Zealand.

== Accident ==
The pilot had already completed nine parachuting operations that day, before stopping for lunch. At 1:20pm (local time, UTC+12), after the aircraft was refuelled with about 160 litres of fuel, the pilot and passengers – four skydiving instructors and four tourists – boarded the aircraft.

Eyewitnesses reported the aircraft's take-off roll appeared to be normal, but after lifting off the ground it continued pitching upwards until it was almost vertical. At around 350 feet, the aircraft rolled to the left so the nose was pointing down, and dived towards the ground. The aircraft was observed to be pulling out of the dive, but impacted with the ground at 1:25pm at an almost vertical angle and burst into flames, killing all nine on board.

The pilot and three of the instructors were New Zealanders; the other instructor and one of the tourists were Australian; the other three tourists were an Irishman, an Englishman and a German woman. It was the worst aircraft crash in New Zealand in 17 years.

== Aircraft ==
The aircraft was a single-engine Fletcher FU-24, a type manufactured in New Zealand and usually used for aerial topdressing. The accident aircraft had been modified in 1998 by replacing the original Lycoming IO-720 piston engine with a Walter M601 turboprop engine. After being purchased by Skydive New Zealand in early 2010, the aircraft was further modified to carry out parachuting operations and re-entered service in this configuration in July, two months before the accident.

== Aftermath ==
A week after the crash, on 11 September the New Zealand Civil Aviation Authority (CAA) issued an emergency airworthiness directive (AD), applicable to all FU-24s engaged in parachuting operations. The AD limits the number of people that can be carried in the rear of the aircraft; and requires accurate determination of passenger weights and of the CofG. In February 2011, the company that manufactured the aircraft released statements critical of the practice of putting larger, more powerful engines in its aircraft, stating that the change could have been a factor in the Fox Glacier and other fatal accidents.

== Investigation ==
New Zealand's Transport Accident Investigation Commission (TAIC) investigated the accident. In an interim report released in November 2010, the investigators found that the aircraft was five kilograms overweight, and that the seating arrangement of the passengers in the aircraft negatively affected its centre of gravity. The TAIC investigators also noted that the passengers were not secured with restraints and that further examination was needed to determine whether that was an additional factor in the crash. Because each passenger had not been individually weighed, an estimate of the total weight of the passengers, weight, and fuel was used in the commission's calculations. The interim report did not contain any analysis, or conclusions, and noted that the findings, analysis, and conclusions of the final report may differ.

The TAIC released its final report in May 2012. The report concluded that "The most likely reason for the crash was the aeroplane being excessively out of balance [which] created a tendency for the nose to pitch up". It also stated that the aircraft probably became airborne too early and at too low an airspeed to prevent an uncontrollable pitch up. It also said that the extreme pitch angle made it improbable that the unrestrained sky divers could have prevented themselves from sliding back to the tail of the aircraft, increasing the weight balance issues. It pointed out flaws in the management of the conversion of the aircraft for skydiving purposes, and documentation errors had not been noticed by the CAA, which approved the modifications. The commission assigned the blame for the crash to the pilot, the company that operated the plane, the firm that modified the aircraft into a skydiving configuration, and the Civil Aviation Authority.

In August 2012, a coroner's inquest into the deaths of the occupants of the aircraft was held in Greymouth, and was streamed live on the Ministry of Justice website. A Fletcher test pilot and an engineer provided expert testimony at the inquest that raised doubts about the conclusions reached in the TAIC's final report. The coroner's final report, released in May 2013, was critical of the way that the investigation had been conducted by the TAIC, and challenged the conclusions reached in the commission's final report. The investigators had ordered the wreckage of the aircraft to be buried only three days after the accident, which prevented any further investigation into possible mechanical failures or inadvertent pilot errors that may have led to or contributed to the crash. The coroner's report felt that it was unlikely that there was any load shift in the aircraft, and that although weight and balance issues may have contributed to the accident, it was likely that some other unknown factor caused the crash.

After the publication of the coroner's report, investigators from the TV3 Third Degree series became interested in profiling the story. Enlisting the help of a private forensic engineer and air accident investigator, the television investigators dug up the wreckage of the aircraft that had been buried shortly after the accident, and conducted flight tests in a similar aircraft. In a report televised on TV3 on March 26, 2014, the programme cast serious doubts on the investigation that had been performed by the TAIC. Among other flaws, the reporting was critical of the fact that the wreckage of the aircraft had been buried on the orders of the TAIC before key components, including the control stick and cables, could be examined by investigators. The private forensic engineer said, “I would think on the evidence we have available, that a control system failure of some sort is likely". After the reports, members of the New Zealand aviation industry and relatives of the victims raised concerns about the TAIC's findings. In April, in response to the media reports, the TAIC announced that it would take a second look at its investigation into the crash. It said that it would involve several consultants, including a metallurgist, in the review.

In 2015, an independent review of the commission's investigation and report found that the conclusions reached by the TAIC were "probably wrong". It said that because the wreckage of the aircraft had been buried shortly after the accident, the ability to find the true cause of the crash was limited. It announced that additional funding had been sought for the Commission to enable the hiring of additional investigators, and that at least two investigators would be deployed when investigating future accidents. It also announced changes in its investigative policy, including the removal of all evidence from an accident site and securing it during the duration of the investigation, the greater use of external experts, increased transparency, and increased training of investigators. MP Phil Twyford said the report revealed "appalling incompetence" on the part of the TAIC, saying, "This is unbelievable mickey-mouse conduct by an agency that's charged with investigating some of our most serious transport accidents". The head commissioner of the TAIC said that an apology to the families of the victims would not be necessary, although some of the families disagreed, saying "We were totally expecting an apology. When we heard her come out yesterday and say very little has changed and they won't be apologising at all, it just stinks of arrogance." A New Zealand First spokesman said the incident was embarrassing for New Zealand and could affect its reputation as an adventure-tourism destination, and a Green Party spokesperson said, "The commission probably owes the family a serious apology and, if they are unwilling to issue that apology, I definitely think that the minister should be pulling them up."

In October 2015, the TAIC revised the final report, concluding, "[TAIC] considered various adverse factors that might have been present singly or in combination, but could not determine the cause of the excessive pitch-up at take-off that preceded the steep climb and the subsequent stall."

== Memorial ==
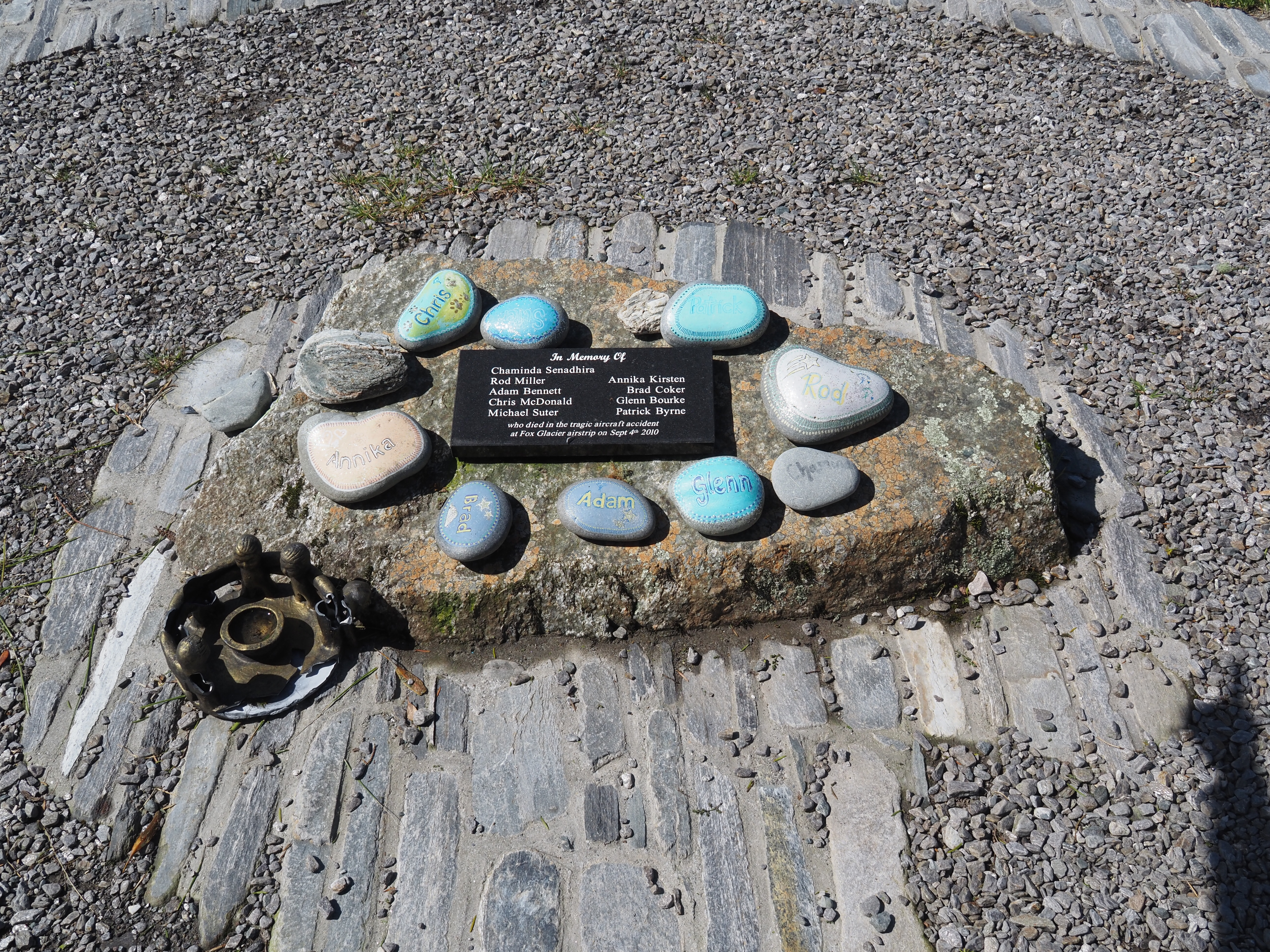
Memorial at Te Kopikopiko o te Waka viewing point

A memorial to the nine people who died in the crash is located at the Te Kopikopiko o te Waka viewing point located 9 kilometres (5.6 mi) to the west of the Fox Glacier township.

== See also ==
- 2015 Fox Glacier helicopter crash
