= Riki Manuel =

New Zealand master carver

Riki Manuel CNZM
- Manuel in 2026
- Born: Riki Henare Manuel; 1960 (age 65–66); Oamaru, New Zealand
- Education: New Zealand Māori Arts and Crafts Institute
- Known for: Māori carving
- Notable work: Pou whenua in Victoria Square, Christchurch; Wharenui at Rāpaki Marae, Te Rāpaki-o-Te Rakiwhakaputa

Riki Henare Manuel CNZM (born 1960) is a New Zealand Māori carver and tohunga moko (Māori tattoo expert) of Ngāti Porou descent.

== Biography ==
Born in Oamaru in 1960 and one of six siblings, Manuel was brought up in Rakaia, before moving to Cobden, on the West Coast, when he was 10. His parents, Manakohia Manuel from the East Coast and Beverley, a Scandinavian from Southland, separated when he was 13. Having left school, Manuel tried to enrol at the New Zealand Māori Arts and Crafts Institute in Rotorua at 15 but was initially declined due to his young age. He successfully enrolled in 1977 where he studied for three years and was taught by master carver Hōne Taiapa. His father, though fluent in te reo Māori (the Māori language), did not share the language with his children being forbidden to speak it at school, prompting Manuel to teach himself Māori and to send his children to kura kaupapa Māori to support their education in te reo. On moving to Christchurch he met and married his wife Vivienne with whom he has six children.

== Commissioned art ==
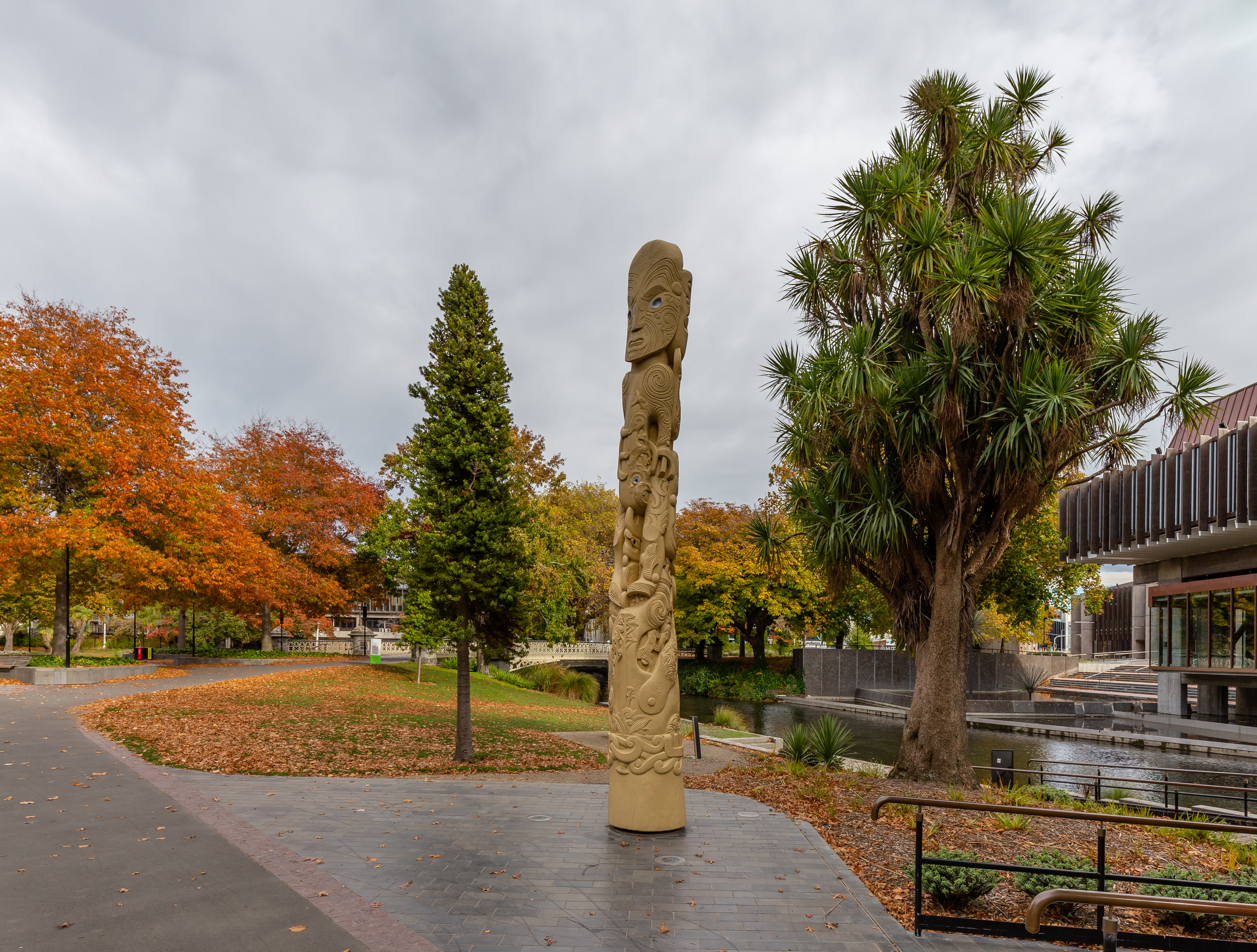
Pou whenua by Manuel in Victoria Square, Christchurch, with the Avon River / Ōtākaro and Christchurch Town Hall beyond

One of Manuel's highest profiled works is the six-metre-high pou whenua carved in tōtara that stands beside the Avon River / Ōtākaro in Victoria Square, Christchurch. Commissioned by Ngāi Tahu, it was unveiled in December 1994 as part of the 1990 commemorations of the Treaty of Waitangi, and depicts two main themes – mahinga kai (food resource) and tūpuna (ancestors). Another commissioned artwork is the frosted window design at the entrance to Burwood Hospital incorporating native kawakawa melding with the Tree of Hippocrates, a legendary plane tree under which the physician was purported to have taught medicine.

Two other significant artworks by Manuel are at Tūranga, the main library in Christchurch. They are Kākano Puananī, which tells the Ngāi Tahu creation story, and Tūhura, the design on the exterior basalt wall on Colombo Street alluding to the voyaging of generations from Hawaiki to Te Waipounamu.

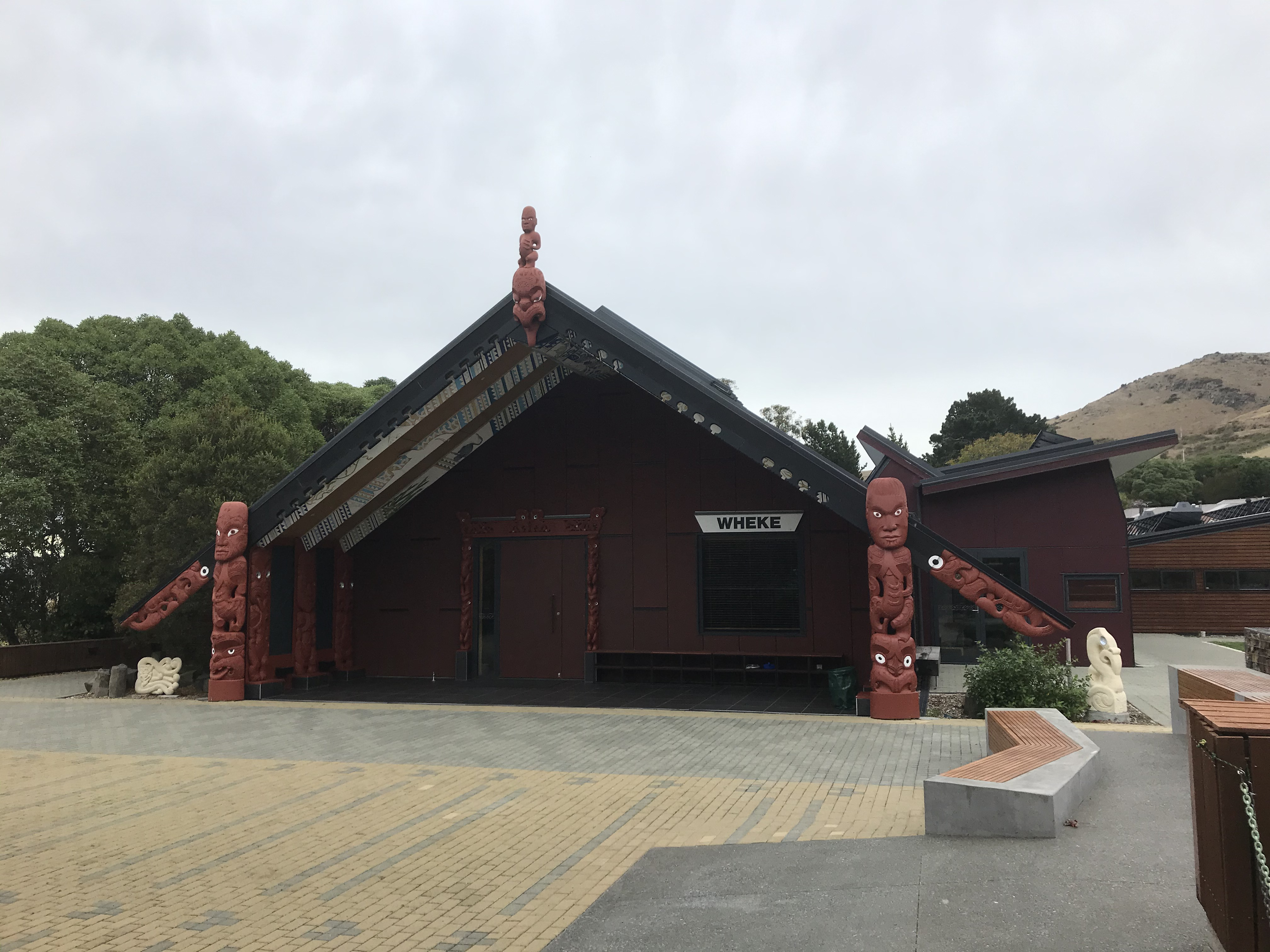
Te Wheke, wharenui at Te Rāpaki-o-Te Rakiwhakaputa

Manuel was the lead carver for the wharenui, Te Wheke, at Rāpaki (Te Wheke) Marae, at Te Rāpaki-o-Te Rakiwhakaputa, which he worked on with Fayne Robinson, and was opened in 2010.

== Honours and awards ==
In the 2026 King’s Birthday Honours, Manuel was appointed a Companion of the New Zealand Order of Merit, for services to Māori art.
