= Jacobs River, New Zealand =

Jacobs River
- Settlement
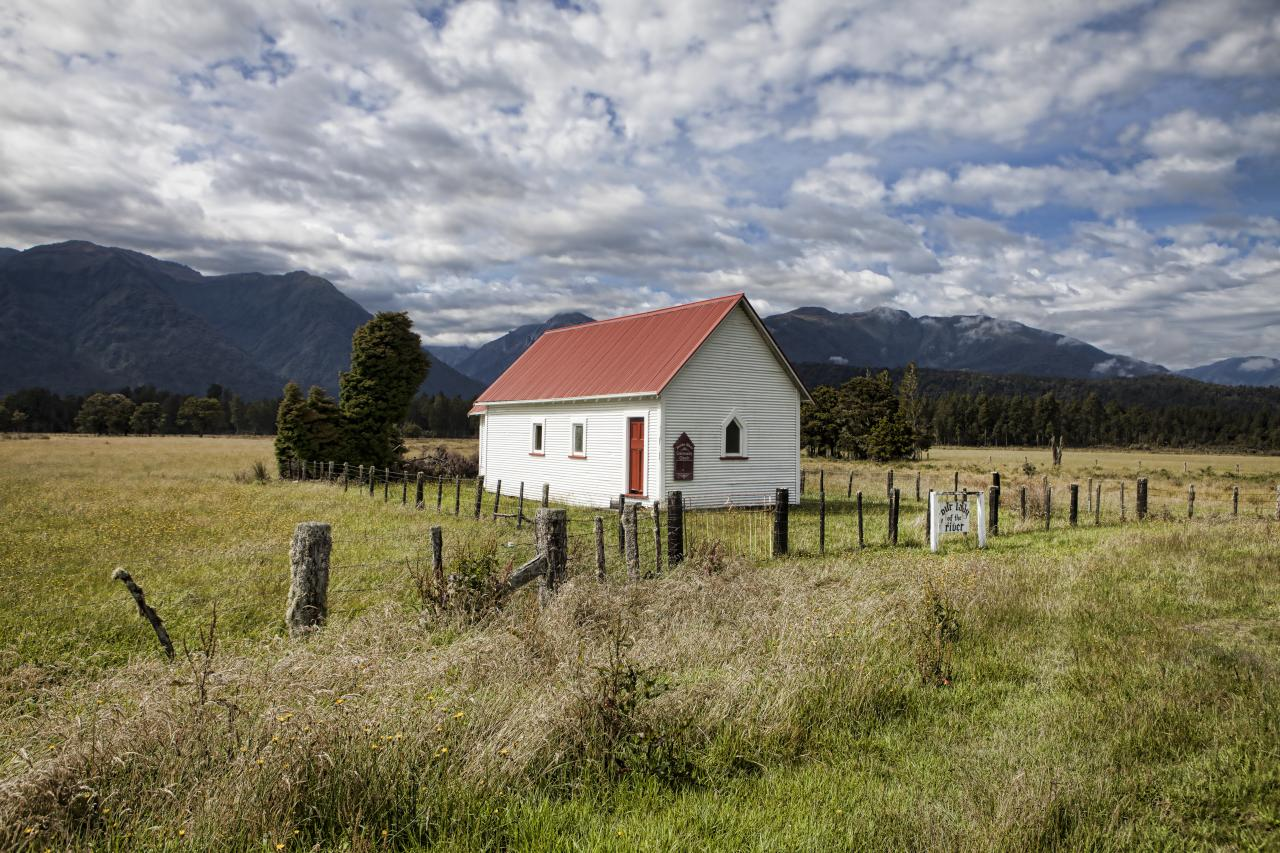
- Our Lady of the River church, Jacobs River, in 2011. The church was destroyed by Cyclone Fehi in 2018.
- Interactive map of Jacobs River
- Coordinates: 43°34′18″S 169°40′47″E
- Country: New Zealand
- Region: West Coast
- District: Westland District
- Electorates: West Coast-Tasman; Te Tai Tonga
- Time zone: UTC+12 (NZST)
  - Summer (DST): UTC+13 (NZDT)
- Postcode: 7886
- Area code: 03
- Local iwi: Ngāi Tahu

Jacobs River is a locality in the West Coast region of the South Island of New Zealand, situated just to the north of where State Highway 6 crosses the Jacobs River. Bruce Bay is about 7 kilometres (4 mi) to the south-west, and Fox Glacier is almost 40 kilometres (25 mi) to the north-east, by road.

== Church ==
A small Anglican church, known as St Peter's Church, was built by Bert Weenick and Harry Bush at Jacobs River in 1931, on land donated by local farmer Bob Ritchie. The church was opened on the morning of 13 December 1931, following by a picnic lunch, and the first service with a congregation of 62 worshippers took place that afternoon. It was later taken over by the Roman Catholic church when the Anglican congregation in the area declined, and renamed Our Lady of the River.

During Cyclone Fehi in early 2018, the church was blown off its foundations and destroyed. Two years later, on 1 February 2020, a memorial on the site was blessed by Anglican and Catholic bishops of Christchurch, Peter Carrell and Paul Martin, and the Māori Anglican bishop of Te Waipounamu, Richard Wallace. The memorial includes a carved stone installation by Fayne Robinson.

== Education ==
The nearest school is in Fox Glacier, following the closure of Jacobs River School on 27 January 2013. The school buildings and land were subsequently purchased by Te Rūnanga o Makaawhio.
