= Te Kopikopiko o te Waka =

Scenic viewing point in West Coast Region, New Zealand

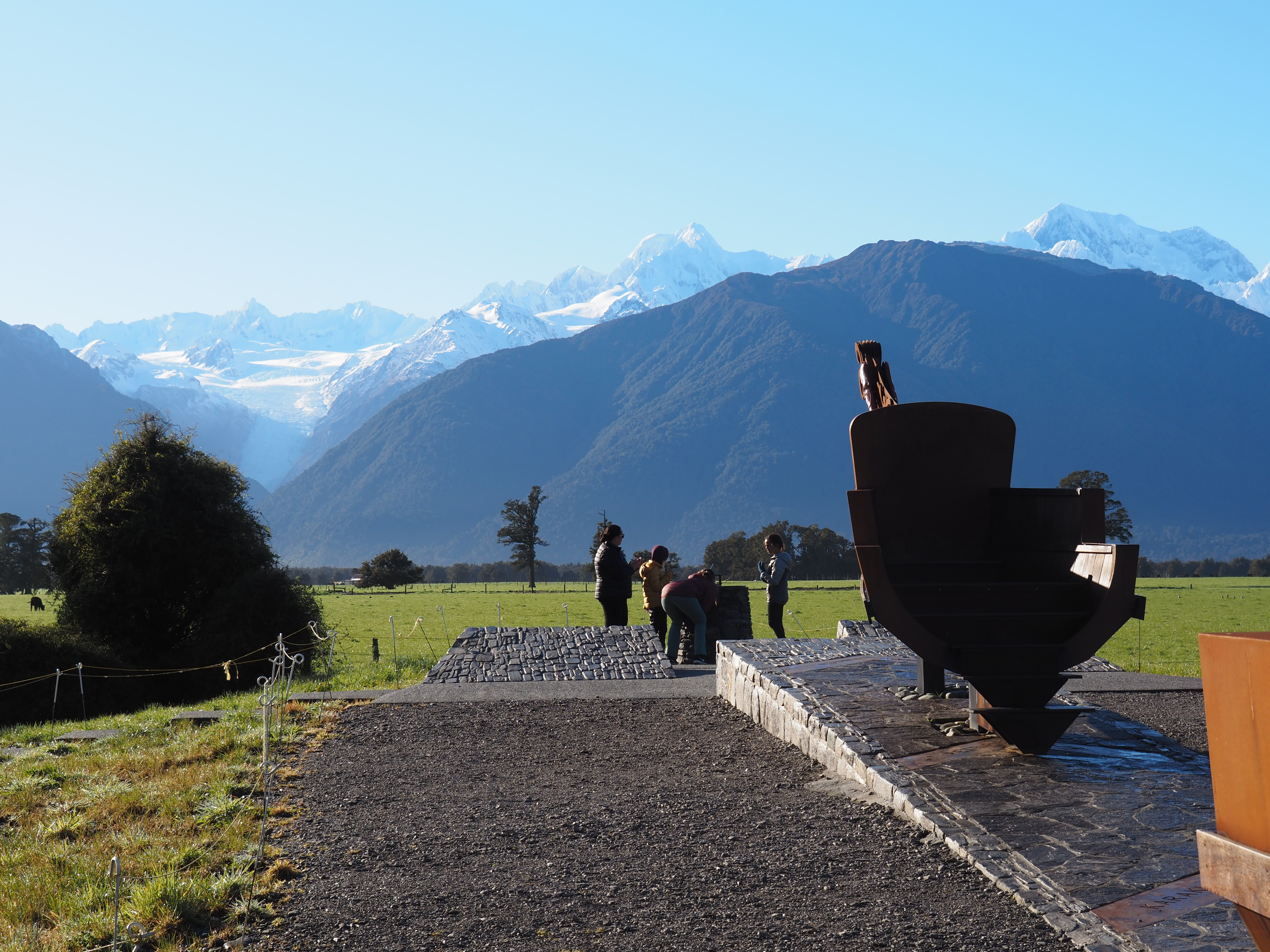
- Artists: Fayne Robinson, Brent Brownlee
- Year: 2022
- Location: Gillespies Beach Road, Fox Glacier, New Zealand; 43°27′06″S 169°54′54″E

Te Kopikopiko o te Waka, also known as Peak View Lookout or Fox Glacier View Point, is a scenic viewing point and cultural heritage site located nine kilometres (5.6 mi) to the west of the Fox Glacier township in the South Island of New Zealand. It provides panoramic views of Fox Glacier and the Southern Alps.

The former Glacier View Point site was redeveloped as Te Kopikopiko o te Waka in one of the seven projects in the Fox and Franz Josef glacier region funded by an international visitor levy. The site is part of a programme called Tohu Whenua – landmarks that have shaped the nation. The programme aims to promote significant historical and cultural sites. Te Kopikopiko o te Waka is the first Tohu Whenua site in the South Island that depicts an iwi story. The installations at the site include contemporary designs by Fayne Robinson and Brent Brownlee, and tell a Ngāi Tahu creation story.

In Ngāi Tahu mythology, Aoraki and his brothers – all sons of Ranginui the god of the sky – made a voyage from the heavens intending to meet their father's new wife, Papatūānuku, the god of the earth. However, they found only a vast ocean so they began their return to the sky but Aoraki, as the eldest and leader, forgot the karakia at the vital moment and the waka crashed back into the sea, where it remains, capsized on its side with Aoraki and his brothers all petrified as New Zealand's tallest mountains.

Te Kopikopiko o te Waka was developed in 2022 by Ngāti Māhaki, in association with the Fox Glacier community, Heritage New Zealand and the Department of Conservation. The viewing point allows visitors to see the glacier without having to walk into the Fox River valley or pay for a sight-seeing flight.

There is a memorial at the site to the nine people who died in a 2010 aircraft accident at Fox Glacier.

At the 2026 New Zealand Institute of Landscape Architects awards, Te Kopikopiko o te Waka was named winner of the parks, open spaces and recreation category.
