= Joe Fluerty =

New Zealand mountaineer and guide

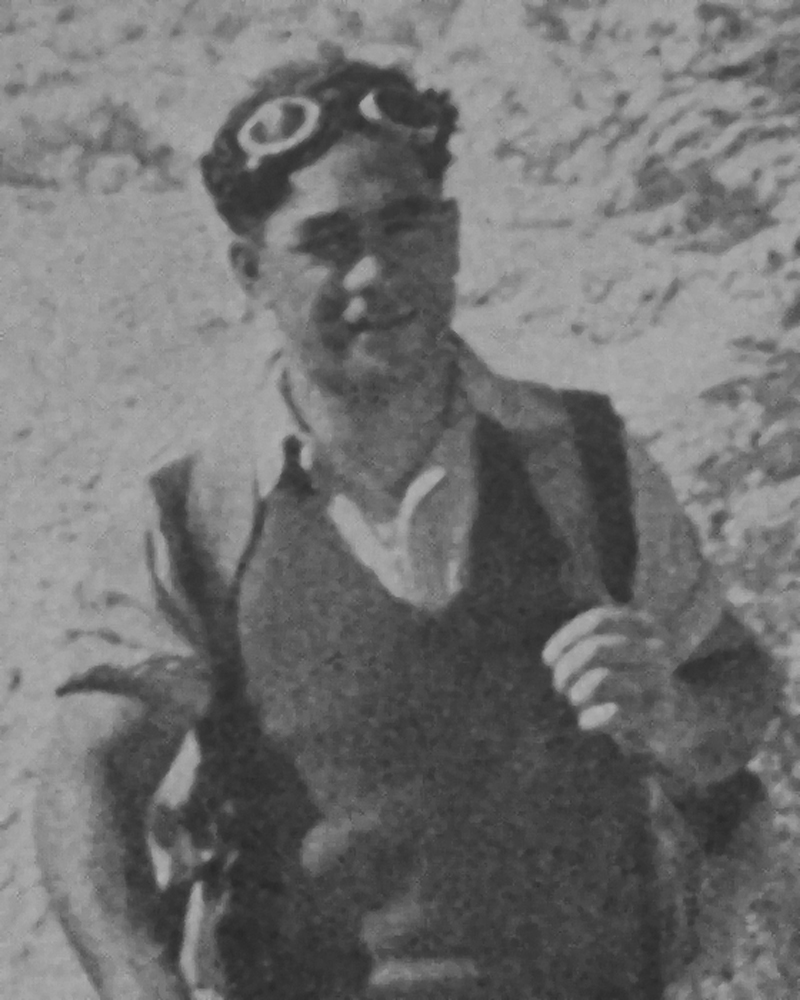
- Fluerty in 1937
- Born: Joseph Fluerty; 1 May 1903; Arahura, West Coast, New Zealand
- Died: 25 December 1977 (aged 74); Nelson, New Zealand
- Occupations: Mountaineer and guide
- Relatives: Butler Te Koeti (uncle)

Joseph Fluerty (1 May 1903 – 25 December 1977) was a New Zealand mountaineer and guide. He was born on 1 May 1903.

He died at Nelson on Christmas Day 1977 and was buried in the Marsden Valley Cemetery.
