= Bruce Bay =

- Settlement
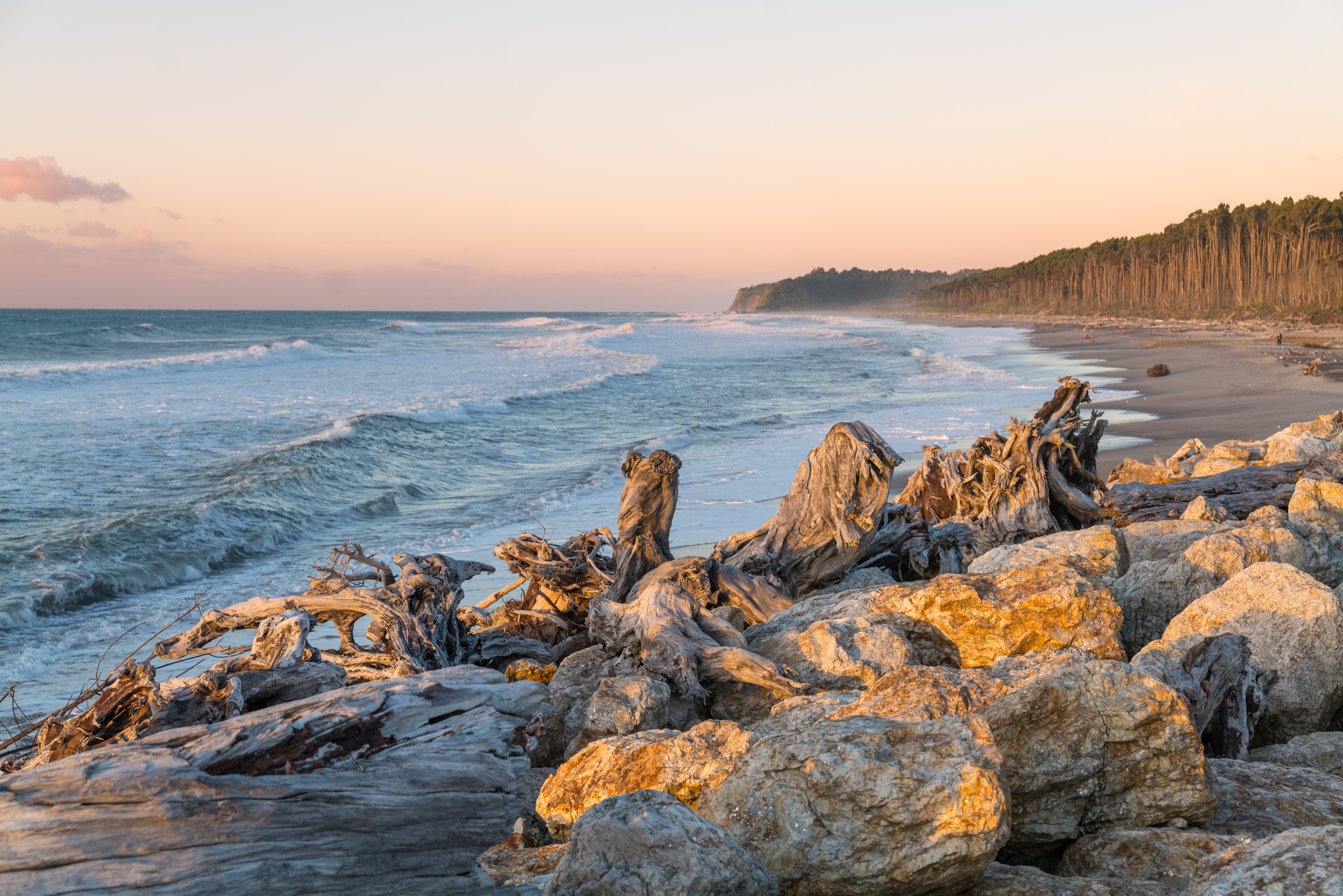
- Bruce Bay

- Location within New Zealand
- Coordinates: 43°36′S 169°34′E
- Country: New Zealand
- Region: West Coast
- District: Westland District
- Electorates: West Coast-Tasman; Te Tai Tonga

Population (2013)
  - Total: 33 (Bruce Bay to Paringa)
- Time zone: UTC+12 (NZST)
  - Summer (DST): UTC+13 (NZDT)
- Postcode: 7886
- Area code: 03
- Local iwi: Ngāi Tahu

Bruce Bay is a bay and settlement in South Westland, New Zealand on the Tasman Sea. It is located on State Highway 6, 74 kilometres (46 mi) northeast of Haast and 45 kilometres (28 mi) southwest of Fox Glacier. The small settlement of Bruce Bay is located just south of the mouth of Mahitahi River. The bay is a nesting ground for the Fiordland crested penguin, and endemic Hector's dolphins and southern right whales can be observed from the shore on occasion. Some of the bush around the bay has been cleared for farming, and quartz stones can be found on the beach.

== History ==
=== Māori oral tradition ===
According to the oral tradition of local Māori, Bruce Bay was where the explorer and trickster Māui first landed in New Zealand before fishing up the North Island. Before landing, Māui had to kill the two taniwha keeping guard on either side of the bay. This feat is recalled in the name of the headland at the western end of the bay, Heretaniwha (literally meaning "to tie up the monster").

=== Early Māori settlement ===
There is archaeological evidence of permanent or semi-permanent Māori settlement at Bruce Bay dating back to the mid-14th century. The inhabitants' diet included fish species including red cod, tarakihi, ling, and barracouta, and it is likely that some of these would have been caught from canoes at sea. Shellfish eaten included tuatua, and green-lipped and blue mussels, while dolphin and seal bones have also been excavated from middens. A variety of stone and bone implements, used for food gathering and preparation, and the shaping of wood, bone and stone, have been found.

=== Hunt's duffer gold rush ===
Bruce Bay was the location of Hunt's duffer gold rush in 1866. Prospector Albert Hunt, who had found gold at Greenstone near Hokitika, was granted a claim some 10 km south of the bay and 15 km inland. He was watched by a mob of 500 diggers at Ōkārito who on 26 March forced Hunt to lead them to the claim. He managed to escape, was recaptured and escaped again. By then there were more than 1500 men camped at Bruce Bay. When the angry mob arrived back at the bay, Warden Price was threatened and in the riot that night six makeshift stores were demolished and ransacked.

The following day, Price swore in special constables at Ōkārito. The ringleaders, William Quinlan and William Ryan, were charged at Hokitika for causing damage to the extent of £664 on freehold property, but the case lapsed as the stores were all on leased land. Weld Town, the township at Bruce Bay with a floating population of over 2000, collapsed as the diggers moved north, although there were still 300 hopefuls there three weeks later.

Several claims were later established on the coast and inland from Ōkārito (then Westland's third port and centre) to Bruce Bay, with a total population of over 3000 and a peak output in June 1866 of over 12,000 ounces of gold. The largest townships south of Ōkārito were Five Mile Beach and Gillespies with 40 and 11 stores respectively. But the beach-workings and Ōkārito collapsed in late 1866, after a run on the Bank of New Zealand at Ōkārito and Ross in July.

=== Weld Town ===
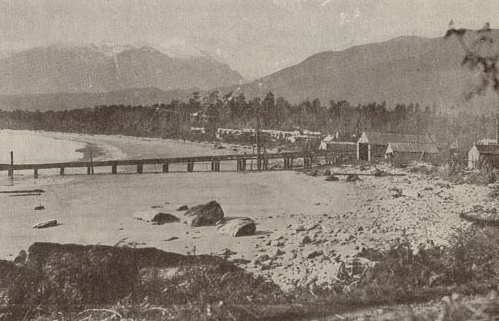
View of Bruce Bay beach and mill settlement, 1941

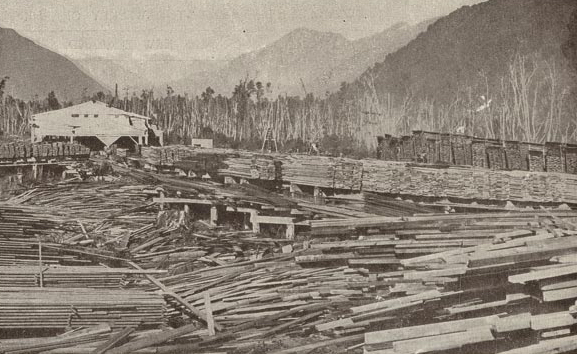
Bruce Bay Timbers Ltd, 1941

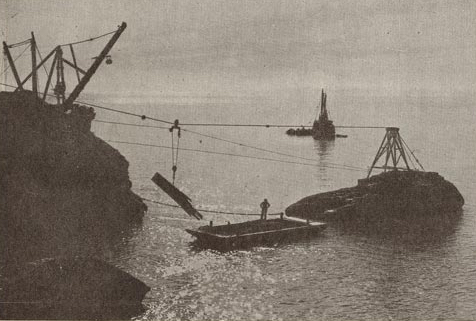
Timber being loaded onto lighters from Flower Pot Rock, 1941

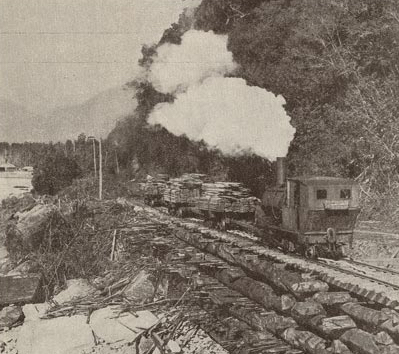
Bush tramway carrying timber at Bruce Bay, 1941

The site of a proposed township, between the mouth of the Mahitahi River and Heretaniwha Point, was surveyed W. T. Brown, the district surveyor, and was to be called Weld Town, after the former premier, Frederick Weld. Although the name appeared on some maps for many years, the name was rarely used locally and the town was not laid out. In 1934, work began on establishing a timber mill at Bruce Bay, Bruce Bay Timbers Limited, with the mill settlement on the site of the paper town of Weld Town. The mill opened in September 1935, and ceased operations following a storm on 28 February 1945. The storm caused flooding, slips and debris that put the small hydroelectric power scheme on Flagstaff Creek (a tributary of the Mahitahi River) that supplied electricity to the mill out of action.

The Bruce Bay Timbers mill processed kahikatea, rimu, mataī and tōtara felled on Māori-owned reserves, for which the owners were paid a royalty by the mill company. The mill handled 1,250,000 board feet (2,900 m^{3}) of timber per year.

The mill settlement provided accommodation for mill workers and their families, and included a store, billiard room and cookhouse. A bush tramway conveyed the processed timber from the mill to the nearby Flower Pot Rock, from where the timber was loaded by flying fox onto lighters that took it out to ships anchored offshore. The timber company also built a bridge across the Mahitahi River, giving access to the settlement. The bridge was washed away following heavy rain in May 1942. It suffered damage during the storm in February 1945, and again in November the same year, and in July 1946 the timber company ceased making repairs to the bridge and its approaches, essentially sounding the death knell for the settlement.

A school opened to service the mill settlement on 8 June 1936, initially with 14 pupils. The school was named Weldtown, as the school at nearby Jacobs River was already called Bruce Bay School. However, from the start of 1937, Bruce Bay School was renamed Jacobs River School, and Weldtown School became known as Bruce Bay School. In July 1945, the two schools consolidated at Bruce Bay, with pupils from Jacobs River conveyed to Bruce Bay. However, in late 1947 Bruce Bay School closed, following the demise of the mill and safety concerns over the Mahitahi bridge, and Jacobs River School reopened. Jacobs River School remained in operation until 27 January 2013, by which time there were four pupils. After the school's closure, the buildings and land were purchased by Te Rūnanga o Makaawhio.

A police station was established at Bruce Bay in 1938, and closed in 1944.

== Etymology ==
The bay and locality take their name from the paddle steamer PS Bruce, which plied the waters of the West Coast and transported miners during the West Coast gold rush.

== Marae ==
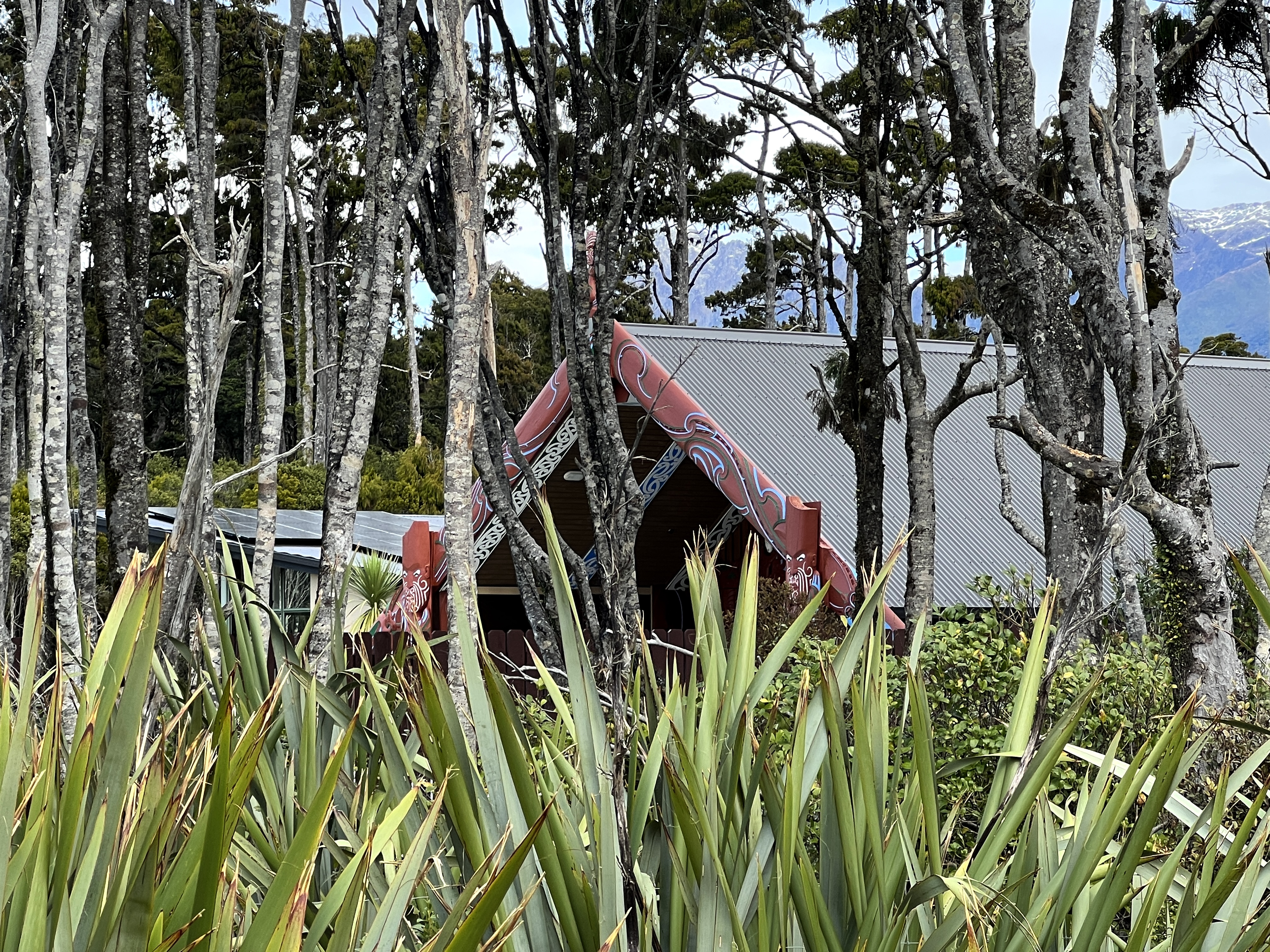
Kaipō, the wharenui at Te Tauraka Waka a Māui Marae, glimpsed through the trees

Te Tauraka Waka a Māui Marae opened at Bruce Bay on 23 January 2005, with its name recalling the landing of Māui on the nearby beach. The marae is the tribal meeting ground of the Kāti Māhaki ki Makaawhio hapū (sub-tribe) of Ngāi Tahu, and includes a wharenui (meeting house) called Kaipō and a wharekai (dining room and kitchens) called Pōkē. Bruce Bay was without a marae for 140 years, with the community hall used instead during this time. The land for the new marae was made available through a land swap with the Department of Conservation, and the building of the marae was enabled after the Ngāi Tahu Treaty settlement. Artists that contributed to the new marae include Fayne Robinson, Puhanga Tupaea, Tungia Baker and Bevan Climo.
