= Mahitahi River =

River in New Zealand

Coordinates: 43°36′S 169°35′E

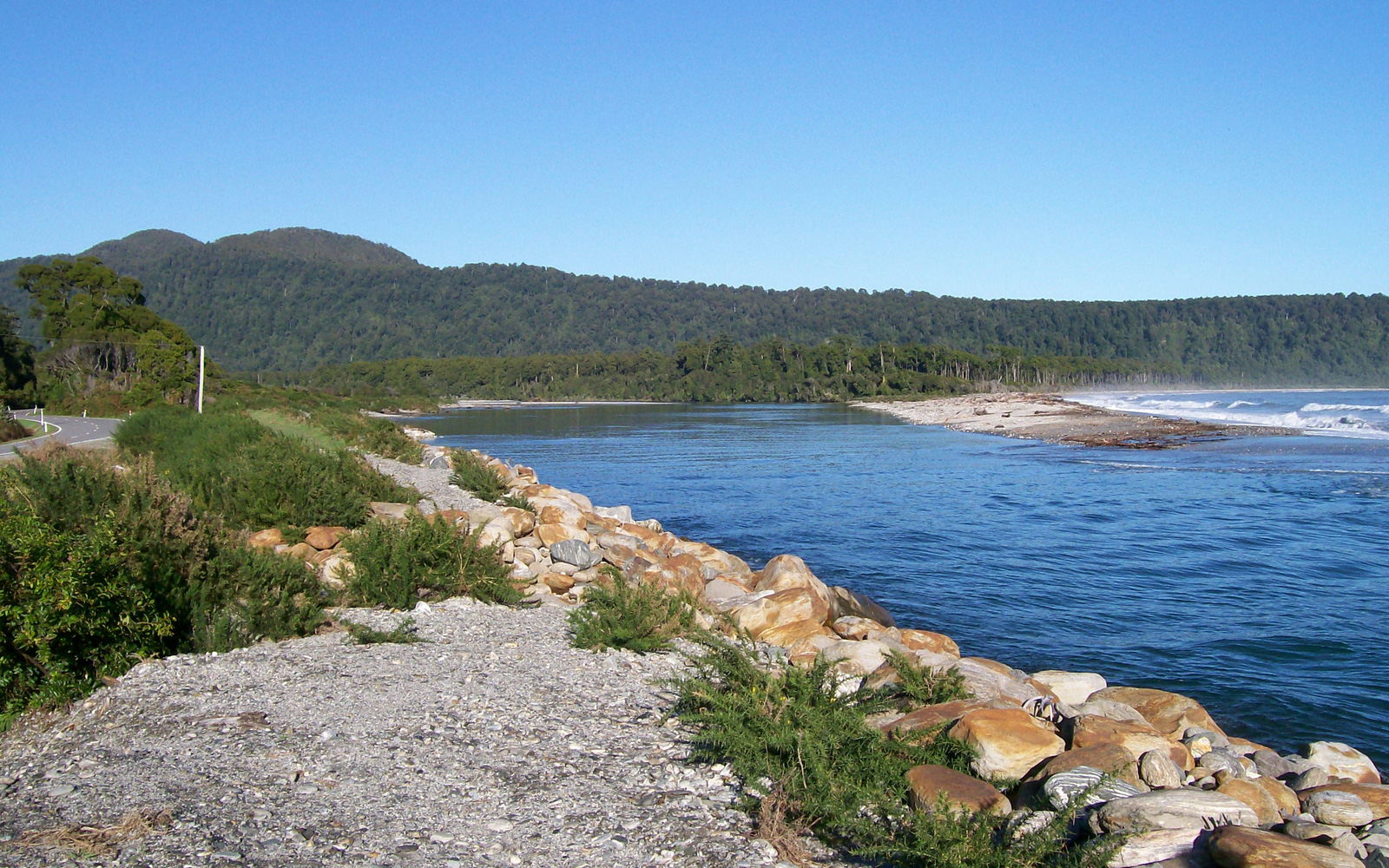
- Mouth of the Mahitahi River

Location
- Country: New Zealand

Physical characteristics
- Source
  - location: Southern Alps
- Mouth
  - location: Bruce Bay
- Length: 29 km (18 mi)

The Mahitahi River is a river of the southwest of New Zealand's South Island. It flows northwest from the Hooker Range, part of the Southern Alps, reaching the Tasman Sea at Bruce Bay.

== See also ==
- List of rivers of New Zealand
