= Richard Wallace (bishop) =

New Zealand Māori Anglican bishop (1945–2024)

The Right Reverend Richard Wallace QSM
- Te Pīhopa o Te Waipounamu
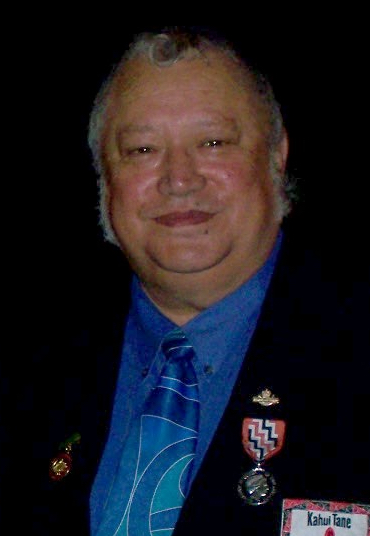
- Wallace in 2009
- Province: Anglican Church in Aotearoa, New Zealand and Polynesia
- Diocese: Te Pīhopatanga o Te Waipounamu
- Installed: 21 January 2017
- Term ended: 6 January 2024
- Predecessor: John Gray
- Successor: Susan Wallace

Personal details
- Born: Richard Rangi Wallace; 23 September 1945 Little River, New Zealand
- Died: 6 January 2024 (aged 78) Wairoa, New Zealand
- Denomination: Anglicanism
- Spouse: Mere Wallace
- Children: 5

Richard Rangi Wallace QSM (23 September 1945 – 6 January 2024) was a New Zealand Māori Anglican bishop. He served as the second Pīhopa o Te Waipounamu (Bishop of Te Waipounamu), from 2017 until his death in 2024.

== Biography ==
Born in Little River on 23 September 1945 and bapisted at Ōnuku Church near Akaroa, Wallace was of Ngāi Tahu, Kāti Māmoe and Waitaha descent. He was raised by his grandparents in an Anglican and Rātana household, and was educated at Motueka High School. Aged 17, he joined the Royal New Zealand Air Force (RNZAF), and served as an aircraft technician for 11 years. During his time in the air force, Wallace met his wife, Mere, and the couple went on to have three daughters and a whāngai son.

After leaving the RNZAF, Wallace lived in Christchurch, and worshipped at the Church of the Good Shepherd in Phillipstown. In 1987, he was ordained a deacon and later that year made a priest, before being appointed the first Māori missioner in Nelson in 1989. He spent 12 years in Nelson, becoming a canon in 1997, before moving to Hokitika when he was appointed archdeacon of Te Tai Poutini.

In the 2009 New Year Honours, Wallace was awarded the Queen's Service Medal, for services to Māori.

Following the death of John Gray in 2015, Wallace was nominated at the electoral college of 23–25 September 2016 to be the second Pīhopa o Te Waipounamu. He was duly consecrated at Ōnuku Marae on the shores of Akaroa Harbour on 21 January 2017, and installed at the Church of the Good Shepherd in Phillipstown the following day.

Wallace also served as upoko of Te Rūnanga o Makaawhio. He died at Wairoa on 6 January 2024. Wallace was one of the kaumātua for the RNZAF, and his body was returned to Christchurch on an air force Hercules aircraft.
