= Fox Glacier Aerodrome =

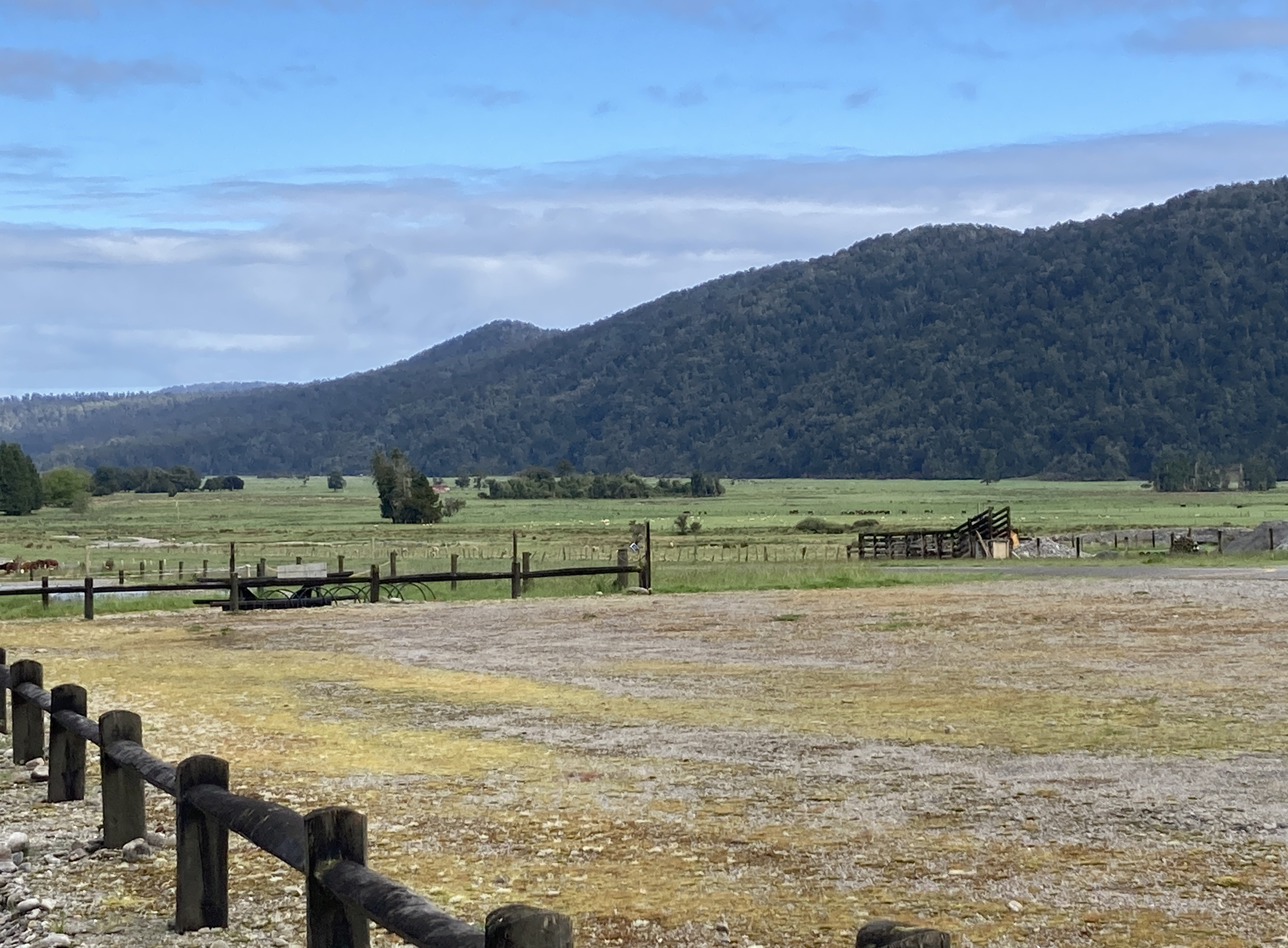
- IATA: none; ICAO: NZFO

Summary
- Location: Fox Glacier, New Zealand
- Coordinates: 43°27′43″S 170°1′9″E
- Interactive map of Fox Glacier Aerodrome

Fox Glacier Aerodrome (ICAO: NZFO) is a small landing strip serving tourist sightseeing and skydiving flights over the Fox Glacier and Southern Alps areas of New Zealand.

== Accidents and incidents ==
On September 2008, a Cessna had a crash landing at the airfield. Everyone survived, but three people were hospitalised.

On 4 September, 2010, a Fletcher FU-24 crashed on takeoff crashed shortly after take-off while operating a skydiving flight. All nine people on board were killed.

== See also ==
- List of airports in New Zealand
- List of airlines of New Zealand
- Transport in New Zealand
