= John Gray (New Zealand bishop) =

New Zealand Anglican bishop

John Robert Kuru Gray (1947 – 13 November 2015) was a New Zealand Anglican bishop.

Born in 1947 of Ngāti Porou and Ngāti Kahungunu descent, Gray was raised at Tokomaru Bay. After studying nursing in Invercargill, he moved to Christchurch where he became active in the Anglican Church of the Good Shepherd in the suburb of Phillipstown. He was elected to the vestry and served as a churchwarden and, for five years, as a lay reader, before being ordained as a deacon in 1982.

Ordained to the priesthood in 1983, Gray was named Pīhopa o (Bishop of) Te Waipounamu, New Zealand, in 1996, becoming the first Māori Anglican bishop for the South Island. He was consecrated a bishop on 17 February 1996.

Gray died on 13 November 2015, and his body was returned to Tokomaru Bay for his tangihanga at Tuatini Marae.
