= Te Pīhopatanga o Te Waipounamu =

Anglican diocese in Aotearoa, New Zealand and Polynesia

Diocese of Te Waipounamu Māori: Te Pīhopatanga o Te Waipounamu
- Incumbent; Susan Wallace
- Style: The Right Reverend

Location
- Country: New Zealand
- Territory: South Island
- Ecclesiastical province: Aotearoa, New Zealand and Polynesia
- Headquarters: Christchurch

Information
- First holder: John Gray
- Formation: 1992
- Denomination: Anglican
- Language: Māori, English

Current leadership
- Parent church: Anglican Communion
- Major Archbishop: Primate of New Zealand; Pīhopa Mātāmua
- Pīhopa: Susan Wallace

Te Pīhopatanga o Te Waipounamu is an episcopal polity or diocese of the Anglican Church in Aotearoa, New Zealand and Polynesia. The diocese is the Anglican bishopric of the South Island of Aotearoa, New Zealand; also known as the synod (or in Māori: Te Hui Amorangi).

Te Pīhopatanga encompasses the South Island in its entirety and also Stewart Island / Rakiura and the Chatham Islands. Its headquarters are at 290 Ferry Road, Christchurch. According to the 2001 census there were approximately 15,000 Māori Anglicans within this area.

Te Waipounamu is one of five pīhopatanga, or episcopal units, that comprise Te Pīhopatanga o Aotearoa, the Māori Anglican Church in Aotearoa, New Zealand.

== Ministry ==
There are seven Ministry units in Te Waiponamu:

- Archdeaconry of Te Tau Ihu o Te Waka: Picton and Nelson
- Archdeaconry of Whakatu: Blenheim
- Archdeaconry of Motueka: Motueka
- Archdeaconry of Te Tai Poutini: Takaka and Hokitika
- Archdeaconry of Otautahi
- Archdeaconry of Otepoti: Dunedin
- Archdeaconry of Murihiku: Mataura and Invercargill

== Structure ==
Te Pīhopatanga is governed by the Hui Amorangi, a representative synod that meets annually. The executive committee meets four times a year, as well as the meeting of the Hui Amorangi Trust Board.

Te Pīhopatanga comes under the episcopal leadership of Te Pīhopa o (the Bishop of) Te Waipounamu.

=== Bishop ===
The first Pīhopa o (Bishop of) Te Waipounamu was John Gray, who was consecrated bishop in 1996 and died in November 2015.

Richard Wallace was nominated at the Electoral College of 23–25 September 2016 to be the second Pīhopa o (Bishop of) Te Waipounamu. He was duly consecrated on 21 January 2017 and installed that month. Wallace died on 6 January 2024.

Susan Wallace was named as bishop-elect on 30 April 2026; she is the daughter of her predecessor, Richard Wallace. She was ordained and installed as bishop in Christchurch on 6 June 2026. Wallace was previously vicar general and manahautū of Te Hui Amorangi ki Te Waipounamu; she is the first woman to lead the Amorangi, the second indigenous woman to be elected bishop in Aotearoa, New Zealand and Polynesia, and the first Anglican bishop with a moko kauae.
